= Monterey, California =

Monterey
- City
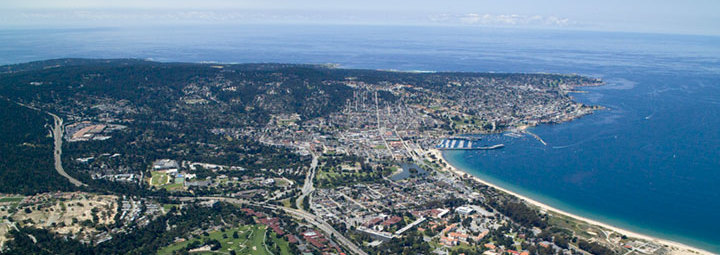
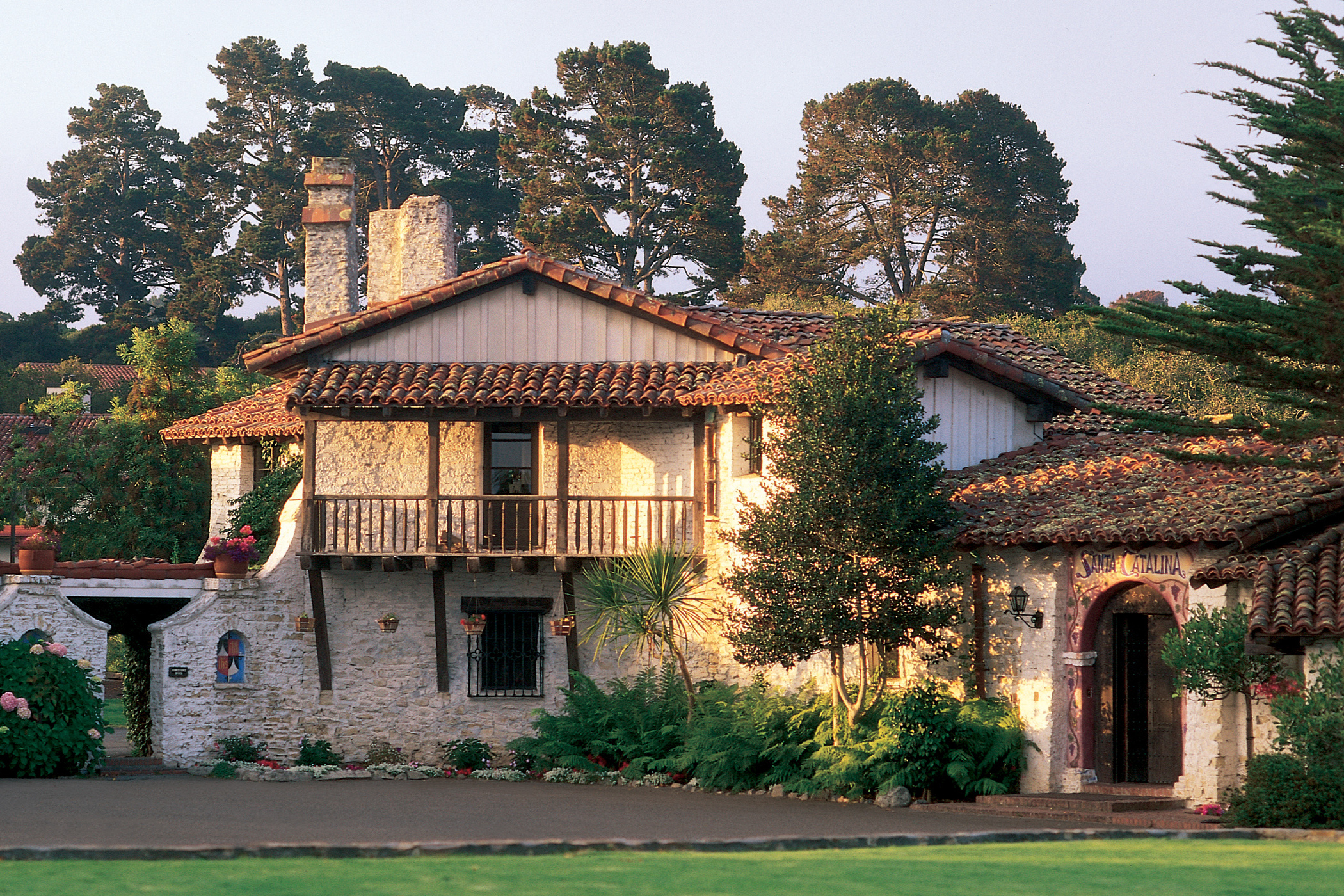
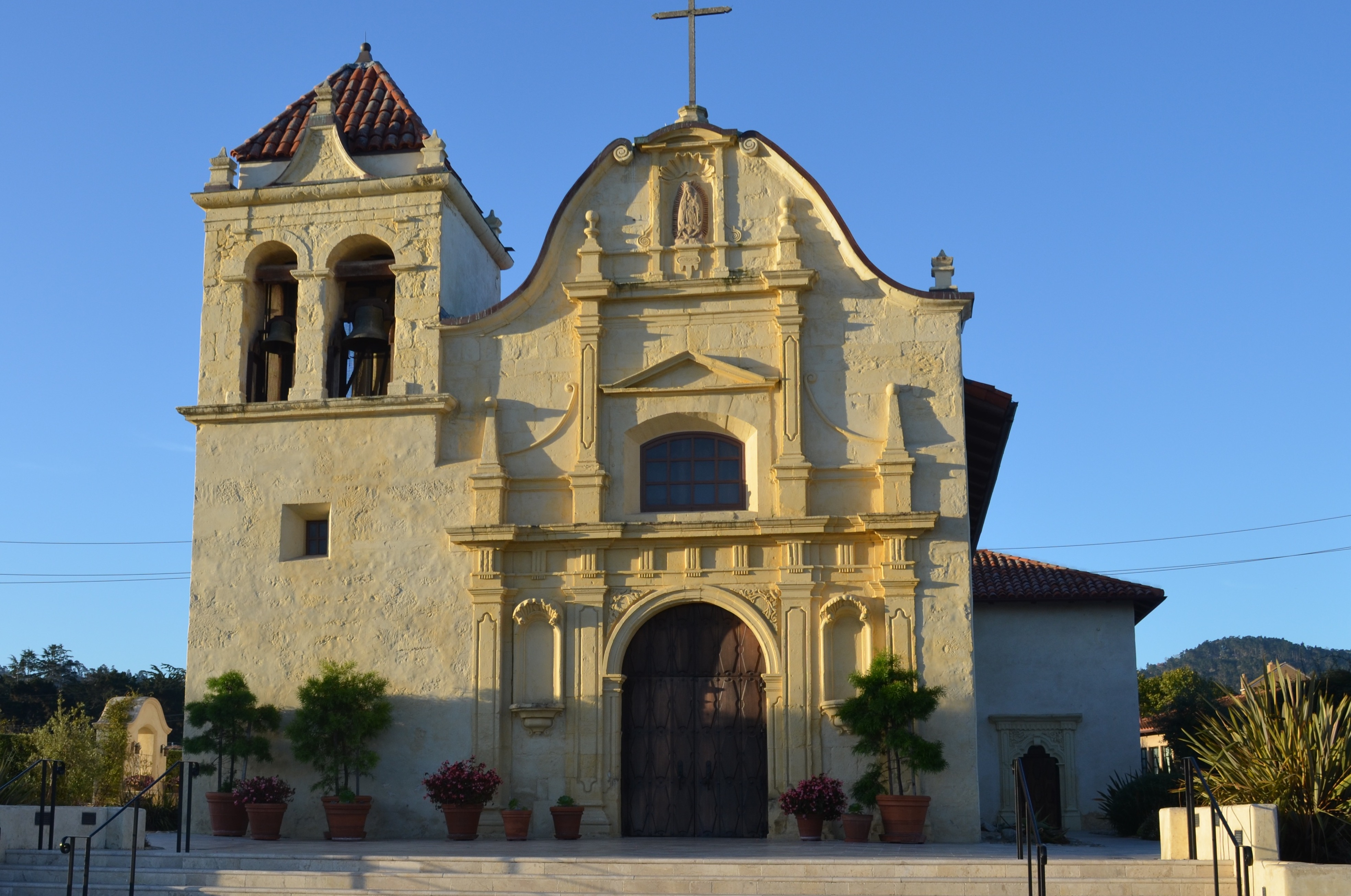
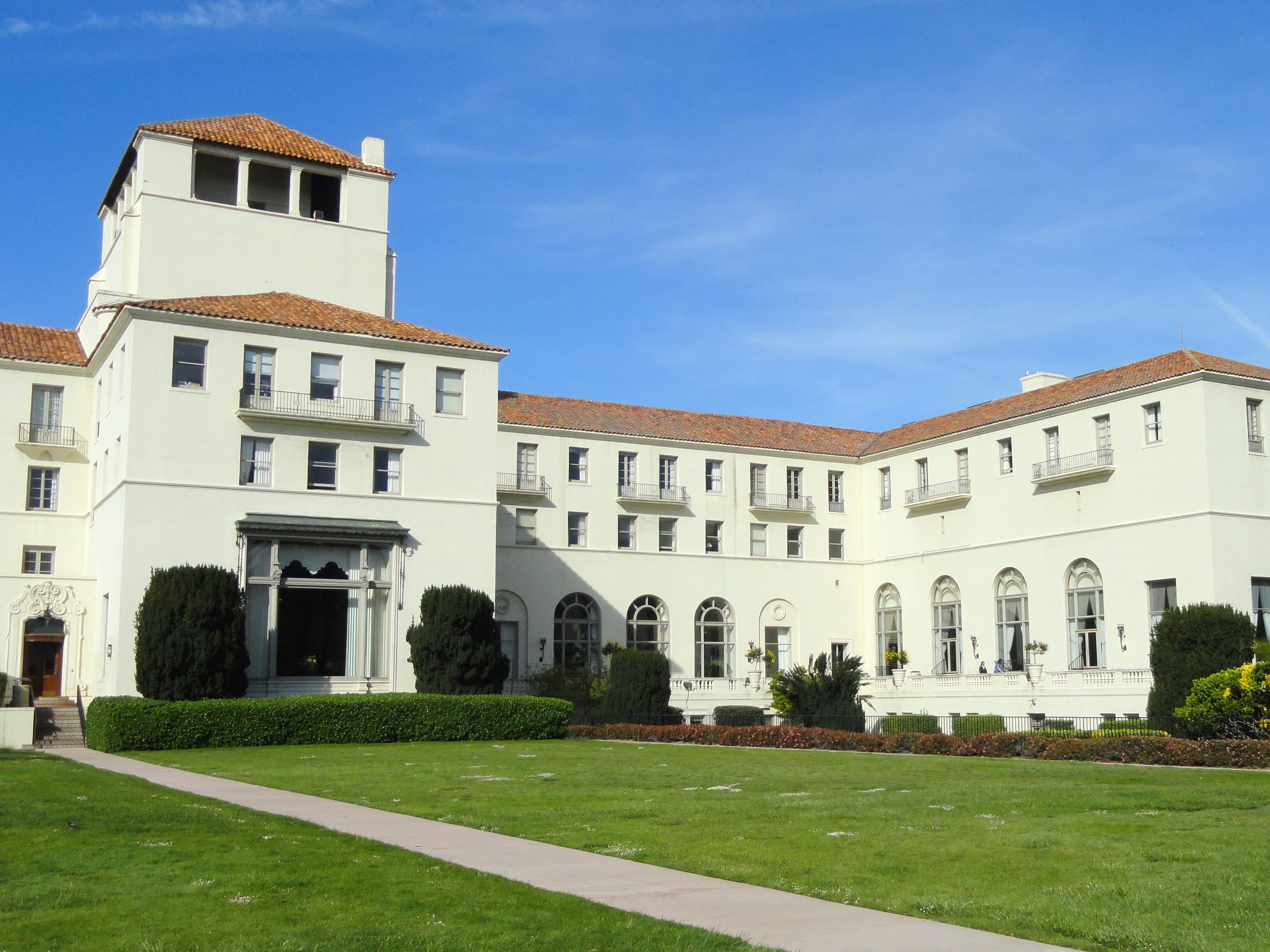
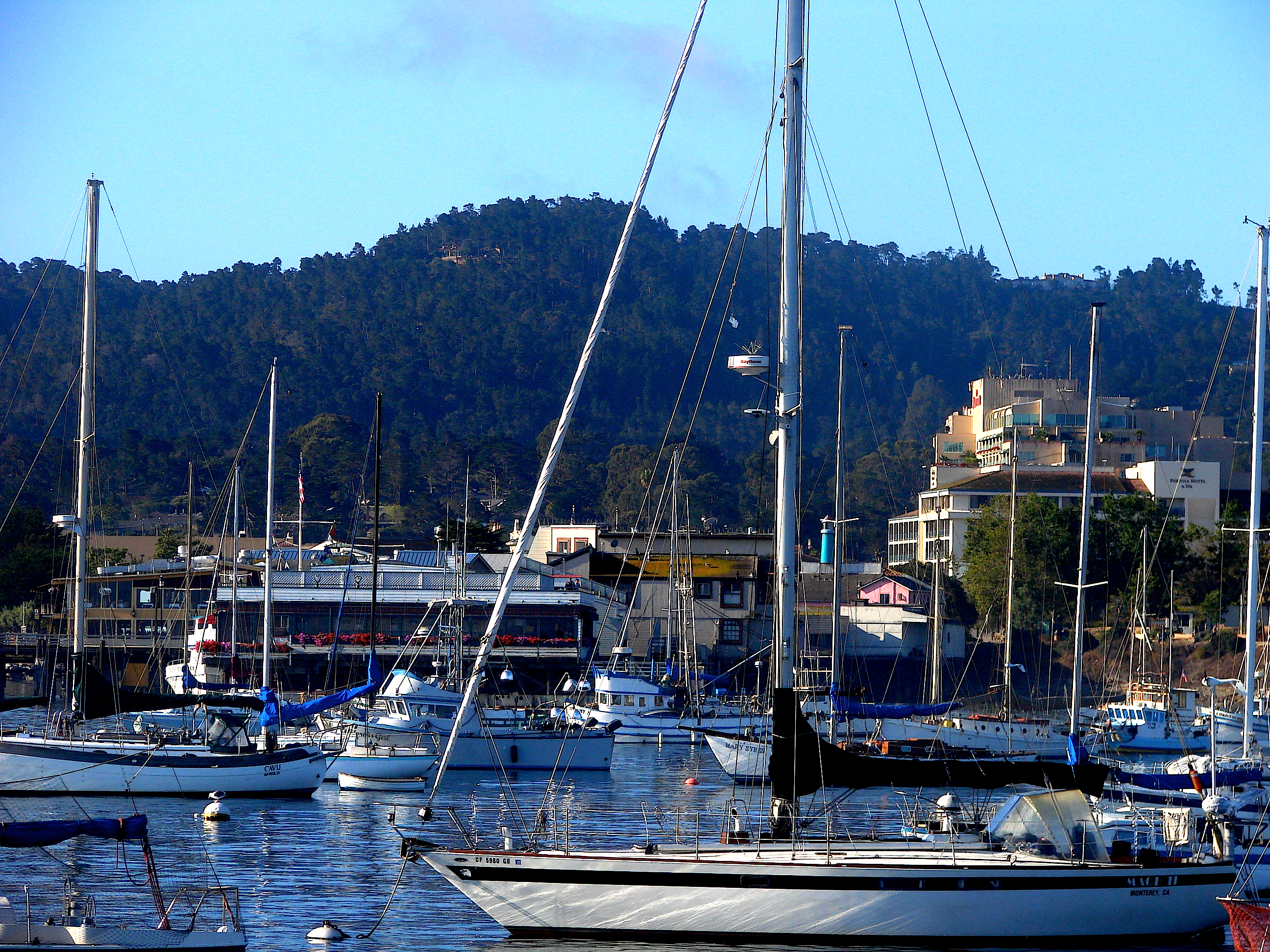
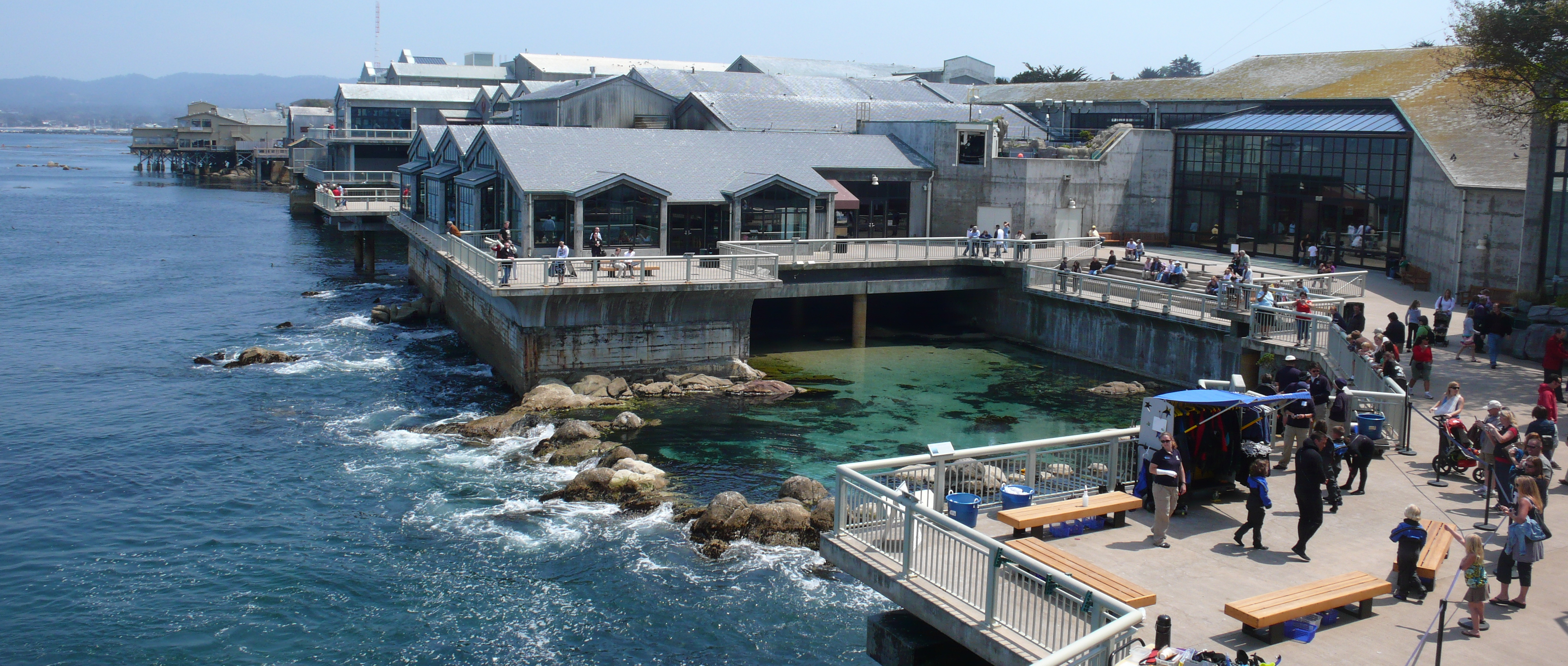
- Clockwise: An aerial view of Monterey; Cathedral of San Carlos Borromeo; Marina; Monterey Bay Aquarium; Naval Postgraduate School; Santa Catalina School

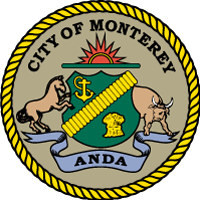
- Flag Seal
- Nicknames: Language Capital of the World, California's "First" City
- Interactive map of Monterey
- Location in California Location in the contiguous United States
- Coordinates: 36°36′11″N 121°53′37″W
- Country: United States
- State: California
- County: Monterey
- Incorporated: May 30, 1850
- Named for: Monterey Bay

Government
  - Type: Council–manager
  - Mayor of Monterey: Tyller Williamson
  - City council: Tyller Williamson; Kim Barber; Gino Garcia; Jean Rasch; Ed Smith
  - City manager: Dante Hall
  - State senator: John Laird (D)
  - Assemblymember: Dawn Addis (D)
  - U. S. rep.: Jimmy Panetta (D)

Area
  - Total: 12.26 sq mi (31.76 km^{2})
  - Land: 8.64 sq mi (22.39 km^{2})
  - Water: 3.62 sq mi (9.37 km^{2}) 29.49%
- Elevation: 26 ft (8 m)

Population (2020)
  - Total: 30,218
  - Density: 3,496/sq mi (1,350/km^{2})
- Time zone: UTC−8 (Pacific)
  - Summer (DST): UTC−7 (PDT)
- ZIP Codes: 93940–93944
- Area code: 831
- FIPS code: 06-48872
- GNIS feature IDs: 1659762, 2411145
- Website: www.monterey.gov

Monterey (/ˌmɒntəˈreɪ/ MON-tə-RAY; Spanish: Monterrey) is a city on the southern edge of Monterey Bay, on the Central Coast of California, United States. Located in Monterey County, the city occupies a land area of 8.645 sq mi (22.39 km^{2}) and recorded a population of 30,218 in the 2020 census.

Monterey was founded by the Spanish in 1774, when Gaspar de Portolá and Junípero Serra established the Presidio of Monterey and the Cathedral of San Carlos Borromeo. Monterey was elevated to capital of the Province of the Californias in 1777, serving as the administrative and military headquarters of both Alta California and Baja California, as well as its only official port of entry. Following the Mexican War of Independence, Monterey continued as the capital of the Mexican Department of the Californias.

During the United States conquest of California, part of the Mexican-American War, Monterey was seized by the American military in the Battle of Monterey in 1846. Following its capture, Monterey continued to serve as the capital of the American interim government of California until 1849, during which it hosted California's 1st Constitutional Convention. In the late 19th century, Monterey and its surrounding area began to attract communities of artists, writers, and other creatives, leading to the creation of an art colony.

Today, Monterey is a popular tourist destination on the Central Coast, hosting notable attractions such as the Monterey Bay Aquarium, Cannery Row, Fisherman's Wharf, California Roots Music and Arts Festival, and the annual Monterey Jazz Festival. The city is also an important hub for the military and higher education, home to the Defense Language Institute, the Naval Postgraduate School, the Middlebury Institute of International Studies at Monterey and California State University, Monterey Bay.

== History ==
=== Ohlone period ===
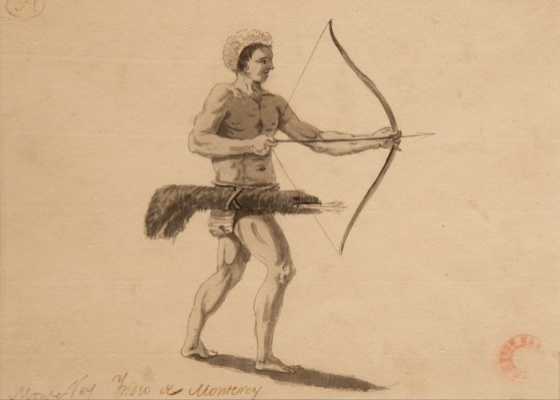
The Rumsen tribe of Ohlone people have inhabited the area for centuries.

Long before the arrival of Spanish explorers, the Rumsen Ohlone tribe, one of seven linguistically distinct Ohlone groups in California, inhabited the area now known as Monterey. Ohlone villages in the area included Ichxenta (Point Lobos), Calendaruc, Wacharon (Moss Landing), and Rumsien (Carmel-by-the-Sea), among others. They subsisted by hunting, fishing and gathering food on and around the biologically rich Monterey Peninsula.

Researchers have found a number of shell middens in the area and, based on the archaeological evidence, concluded the Ohlone's primary marine food consisted of various types of mussels and abalone. A number of midden sites have been located along about 12 miles (19 km) of rocky coast on the Monterey Peninsula from the current site of Fishermans' Wharf in Monterey to Carmel.

=== Spanish period ===
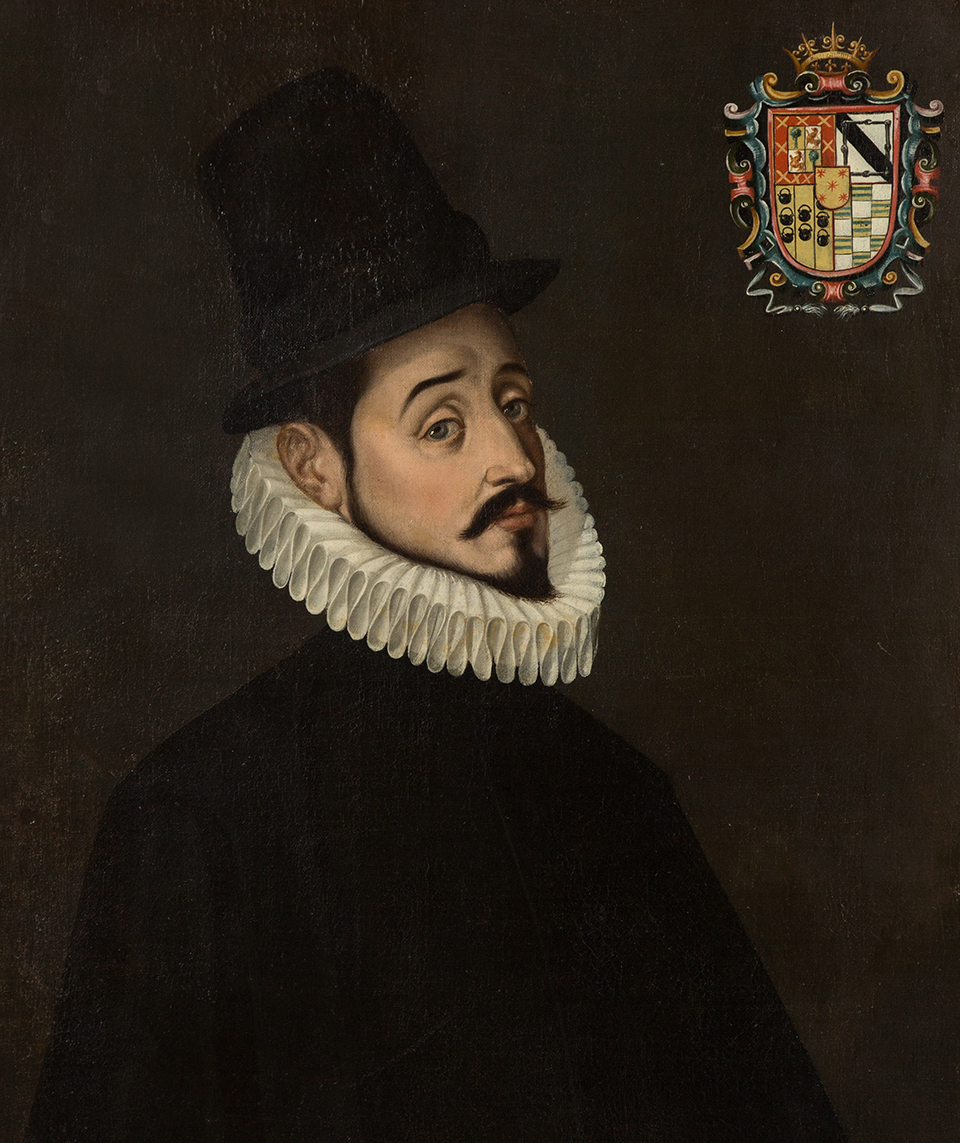
Gaspar de Zúñiga, 5th Count of Monterrey, namesake of Monterey Bay, and thus the city and county

The city is named after Monterey Bay. The bay's name was given by Sebastián Vizcaíno in 1602. He anchored in what is now Monterey harbor on December 16, and named it Puerto de Monterrey, in honor of the Conde de Monterrey, then the viceroy of New Spain. Monterrey is an alternate spelling of Monterrei, a municipality in the Galicia region of Spain from which the viceroy and his father (the Fourth Count of Monterrei) originated. Some variants of the city's name are recorded as Monte Rey and Monterey. Monterey Bay had been described earlier by Juan Rodríguez Cabrillo as La Bahia de los Pinos (Bay of the Pines). Despite the explorations of Cabrillo and Vizcaino, and despite Spain's frequent trading voyages between Asia and Mexico, the Spanish did not make Monterey Bay into a settled permanent harbor before the 18th century. Monterey Harbor was too exposed to rough ocean currents and winds. Nonetheless, Monterey was known as a location with tall pines for repairing masts. In 1745, the King's appointee to the Manila (Philippines) audiencia, Pedro Calderon Henriquez, began lobbying to build a shipyard staffed by Filipino artisans in Monterey, with the goal of using the ships to defend the commercial route from piracy.

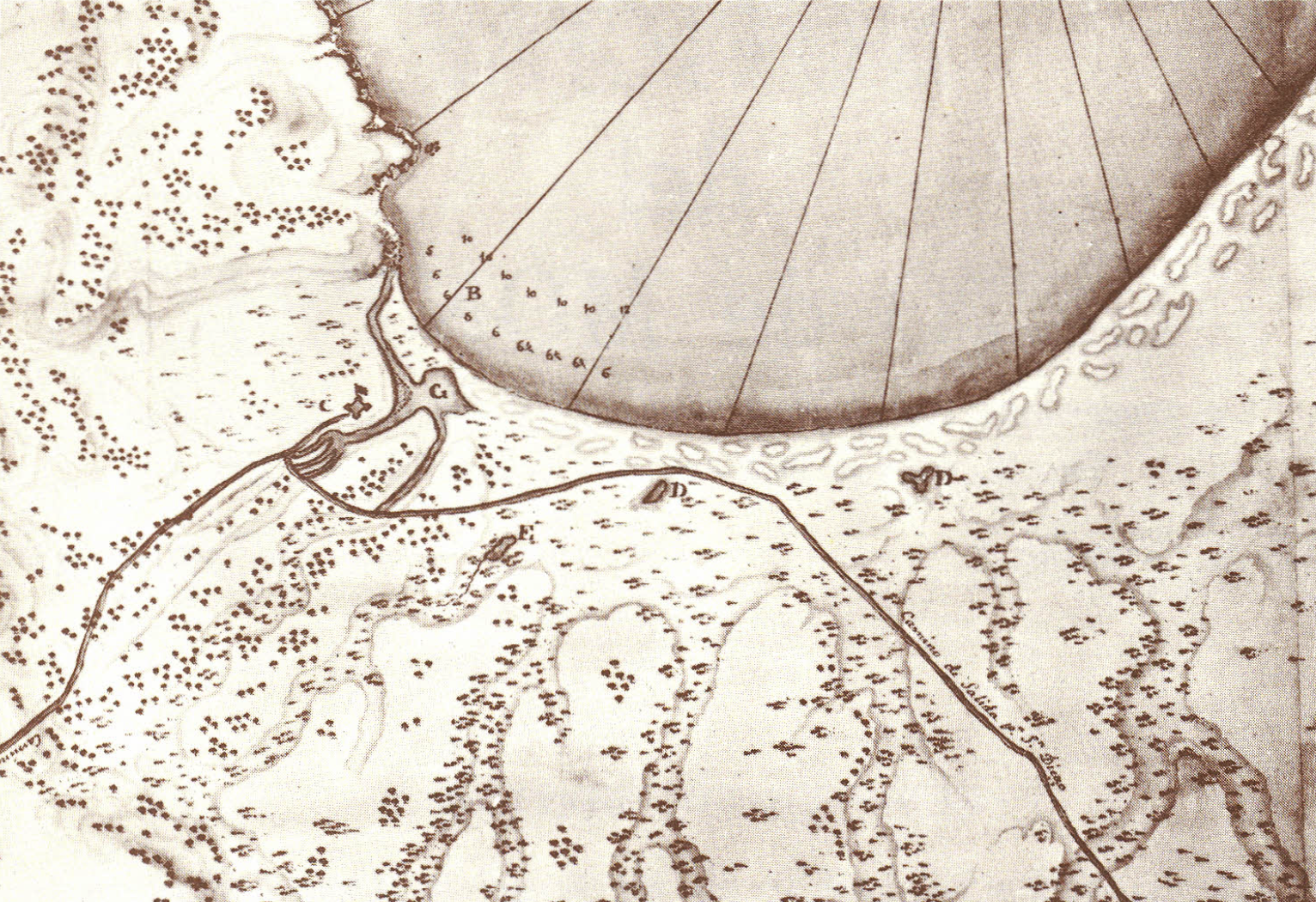
Portion of the 1770 map of the Port and Bay of Monterey by Miguel Costansó. B indicates the anchorage. C marks location of original Presidio and Mission of San Carlos. G shows the 1770 expanse of EI Estero.

Despite Monterey's limited use as a maritime port, the encroachments of other Europeans near California in the 18th century prompted the Spanish monarchy to try to better secure the region. As a result, it commissioned the Portola exploration and Alta California mission system. In 1769, the first European land exploration of Alta California, the Spanish Portolá expedition, traveled north from San Diego. They sought Vizcaíno's Port of Monterey, which he had described as "a fine harbor sheltered from all winds" 167 years earlier. The explorers failed to recognize the place when they came to it on October 1, 1769. The party continued north as far as San Francisco Bay before turning back. On the return journey, they camped near one of Monterey's lagoons on November 27, still not convinced they had found the place Vizcaíno had described. Franciscan missionary Juan Crespí noted in his diary, "We halted in sight of the Point of Pines (recognized, as was said, in the beginning of October) and camped near a small lagoon which has rather muddy water, but abounds in pasture and firewood."

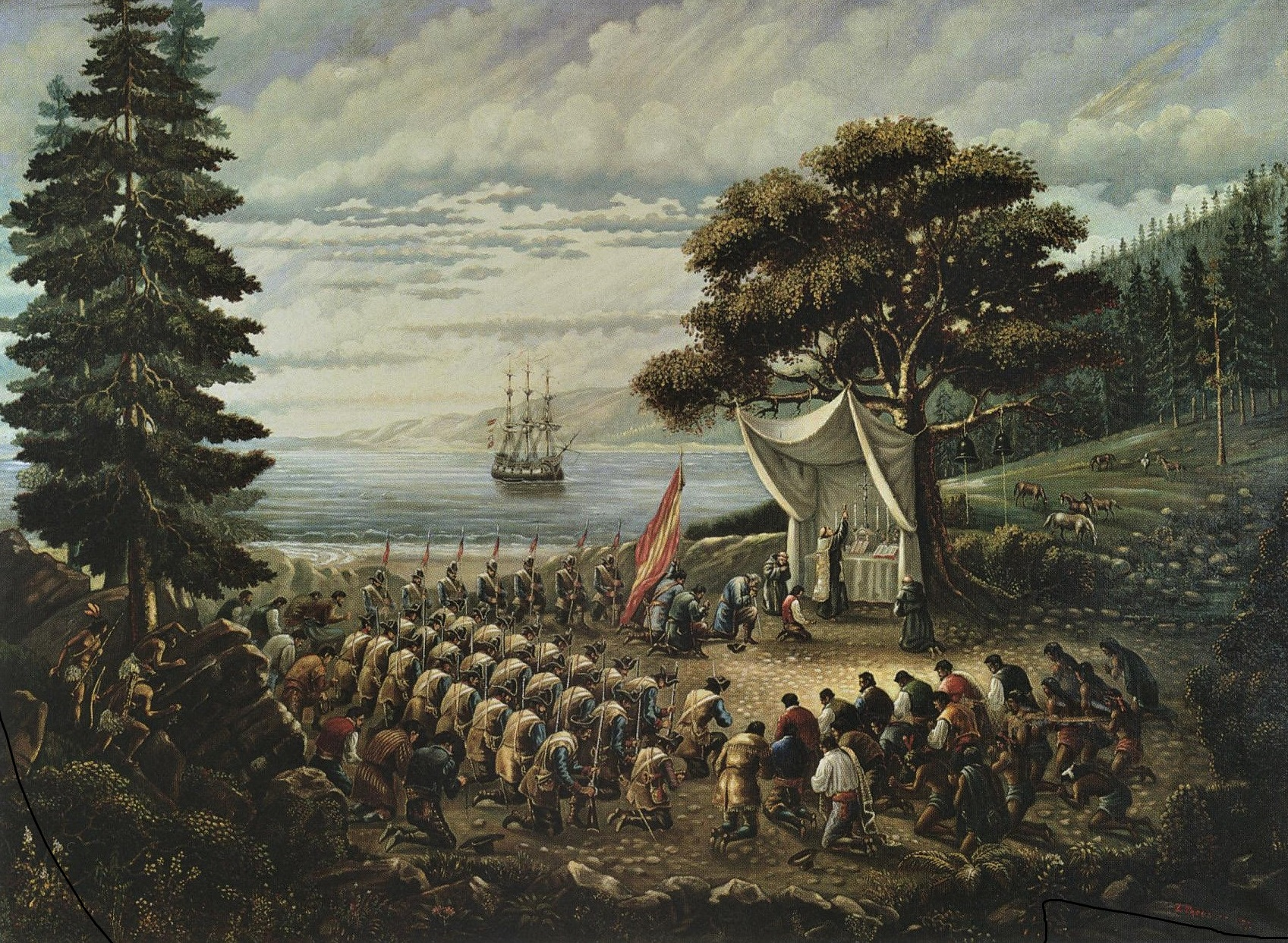
Saint Junípero Serra celebrating mass in Monterey in 1770.

Gaspar de Portolá returned by land to Monterey the next year, having concluded that he must have been at Vizcaíno's Port of Monterey after all. The land party was met at Monterey by Junípero Serra, who traveled by sea. Portolá erected the Presidio of Monterey to defend the port and, on June 3, 1770, Serra founded the Cathedral of San Carlos Borromeo inside the presidio enclosure. Portolá returned to Mexico, replaced in Monterey by Captain Pedro Fages, who had been third in command on the exploratory expeditions. Fages became the second governor of Alta California, serving from 1770 to 1774.

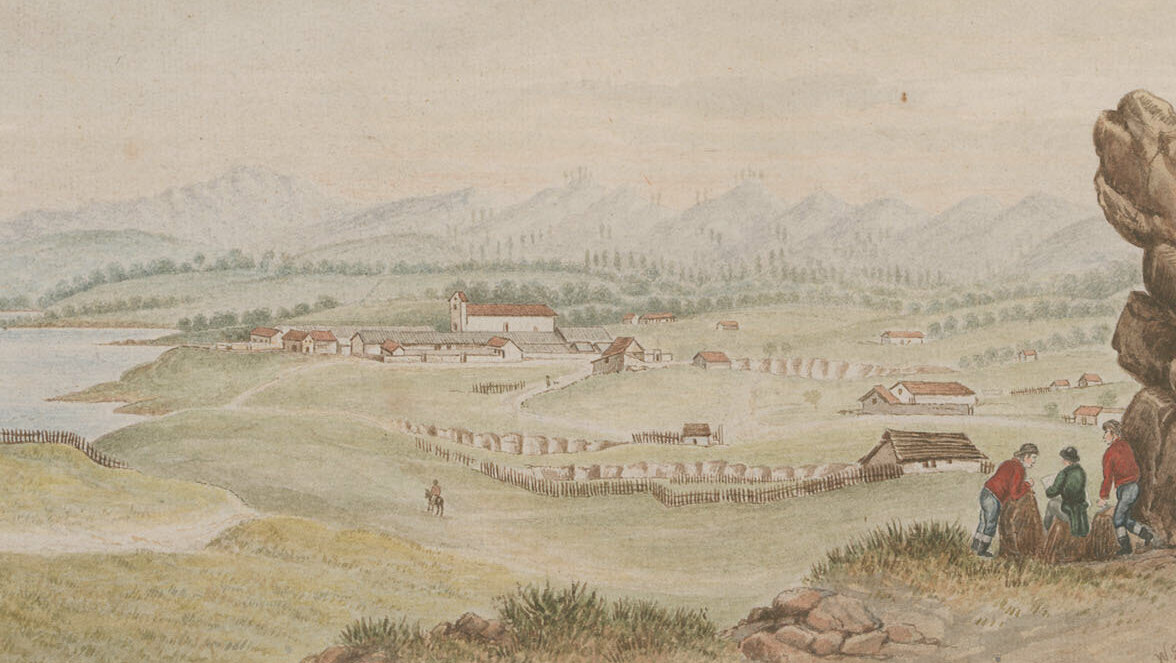
The Presidio of Monterey was built in 1771 by Pedro Fages, on a site selected by Miguel Costansó in 1770.

Serra's missionary aims soon came into conflict with Fages and the soldiers, so he relocated and built a new mission in Carmel the next year to gain greater independence from Fages. The existing wood and adobe church remained in service to the nearby soldiers and became the Royal Presidio Chapel.

Monterey became the capital of the "Province of Both Californias" in 1777, and the chapel was renamed the Royal Presidio Chapel. The original church was destroyed by fire in 1789 and replaced by the present sandstone structure. It was completed in 1794 by Indian labor. In 1840, the chapel was rededicated to the patronage of Saint Charles Borromeo. The cathedral is the oldest continuously operating parish and the oldest stone building in California. It is also the oldest (and smallest) serving cathedral along with St. Louis Cathedral in New Orleans, Louisiana. It is the only existing presidio chapel in California and the only surviving building from the original Monterey Presidio.

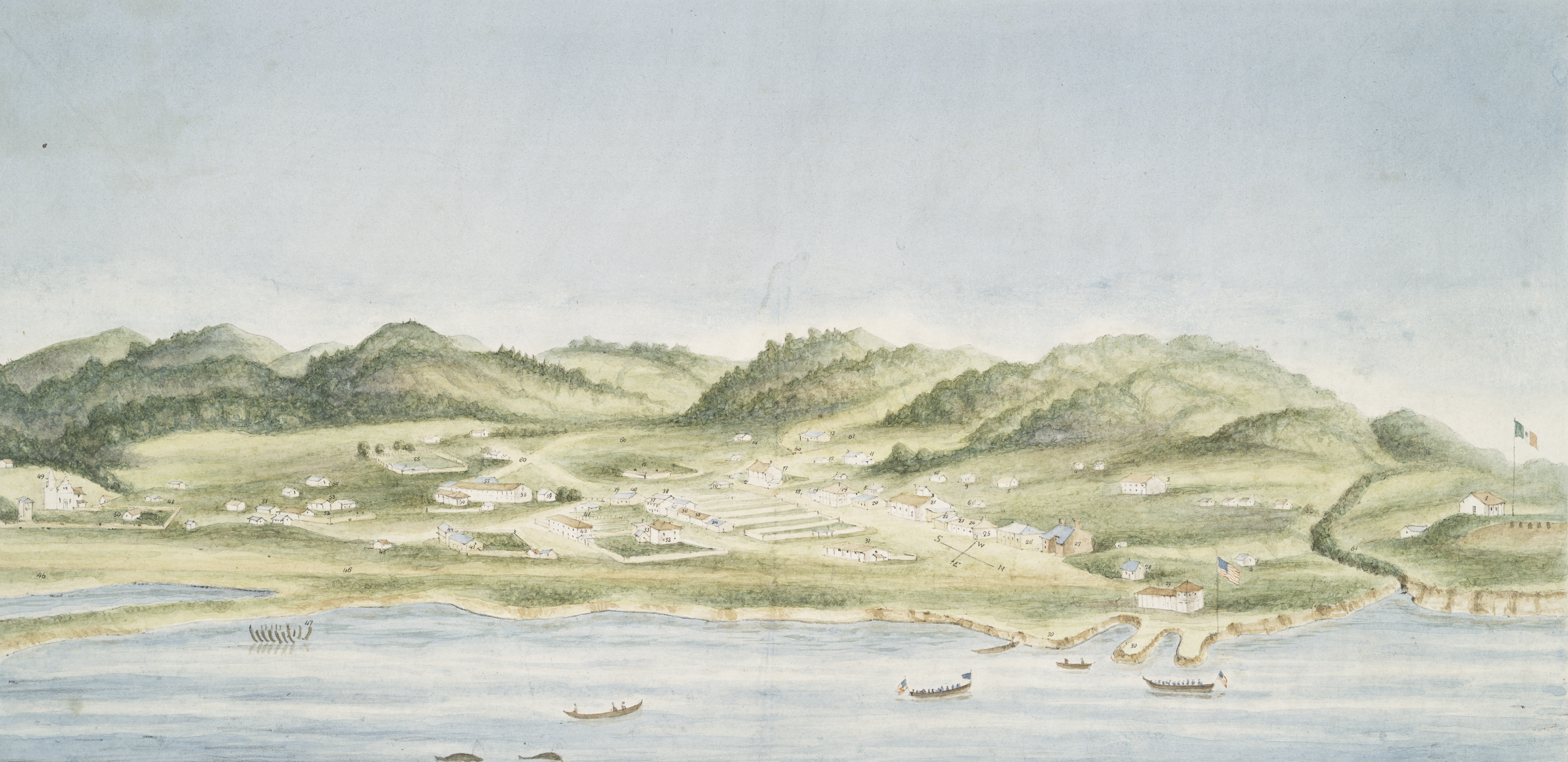
Monterey served as the capital of Alta California from 1770 until 1849, hosting its only official port-of-entry and the provincial legislature.

The city was originally the only port of entry for all taxable goods in California. All shipments into California by sea were required to go through the Custom House, the oldest governmental building in the state and California's Historic Landmark Number One. Built in three phases, the Spanish began construction of the Custom House in 1814, the Mexican government completed the center section in 1827, and the United States government finished the lower end in 1846.

=== Argentine raid and occupation ===
On November 24, 1818, Argentine corsair Hippolyte Bouchard landed approximately 7 km (4.3 mi) from the Presidio of Monterey, using a hidden tidal creek to conceal his approach. Operating under a letter of marque from the United Provinces of the Río de la Plata, Bouchard carried out the expedition as part of Argentina’s broader efforts to disrupt Spanish colonial control during the South American wars of independence.

The Spanish garrison offered minimal resistance, and after roughly an hour of combat, Bouchard’s forces succeeded in capturing the fort. The Argentine flag was then raised over Monterey, marking a symbolic assertion of Argentine presence on the Pacific coast of North America. Although the Spanish flag had long flown there as part of colonial rule, this event marked the first time an independent foreign nation had occupied and hoisted its flag in California preceding both the Mexican and United States flags.

Bouchard’s forces occupied Monterey for six days. During the occupation, they seized livestock and supplies, and set fire to several strategic buildings, including the fort, the artillery headquarters, the governor’s residence, and various Spanish colonial homes. Despite the destruction of infrastructure, the civilian population was not harmed. After achieving their objectives, the Argentines withdrew and continued their privateering campaign along the Pacific coast.

=== Mexican period ===
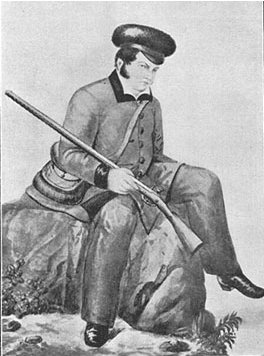
Agustín V. Zamorano established his Monterey print shop in 1834, becoming California's first publisher.

Mexico gained independence from Spain in 1821, but the civil and religious institutions of Alta California remained much the same until the 1830s, when the secularization of the missions converted most of the mission pasture lands into private land grant ranchos. In 1834, the San Carlos Cemetery was officially opened and interred many of the early local families. Agustín V. Zamorano established the first print shop in California, when he brought a printing press to Monterey, in the summer of 1834.

During the Mexican period, the city was determined the site of District Court of the Territory of Alta California (Juzgado de Distrito del Territorio de la Alta California), since 1834, when Luis del Castillo Negrete, the appointed district judge (Juez de Distrito), took possession of the court; until 1836, when due to the rebellion led by Juan Bautista Alvarado, the judge left the city for the territory of Baja California, which de facto disqualified that instance and would close definitively until 1841, with a decree by Antonio López de Santa Anna. Subsequently, in 1842, the Superior Court (Superior Tribunal de Justicia del Departamento de las Californias) was installed, which had a short life, as it stopped functioning in 1845.

Monterey was the site of the Battle of Monterey on July 7, 1846, during the Mexican–American War. It was on this date that John D. Sloat, Commodore in the United States Navy, raised the U.S. flag over the Monterey Custom House and claimed California for the United States.

In addition, many historic "firsts" occurred in Monterey. These include First theater in California, brick house, publicly funded school, public building, public library, and printing press (which printed The Californian, California's first newspaper.) Larkin House, one of Monterey State Historic Park's National Historic Landmarks, built in the Mexican period by Thomas Oliver Larkin, is an early example of Monterey Colonial architecture. The Old Custom House, the historic district and the Royal Presidio Chapel are also National Historic Landmarks. The Cooper-Molera Adobe is a National Trust Historic Site.

=== American period ===
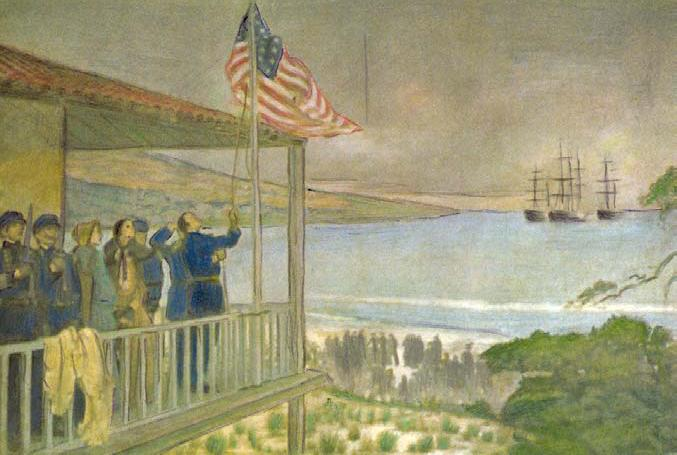
The 1846 Battle of Monterey, part of the U.S. conquest of California, resulted in American forces capturing the capital of Mexican California.

Colton Hall, built in 1849 by Walter Colton, originally served as both a public school and a government meeting place. It hosted the 1849 Constitutional Convention, where American and Californio delegates drafted the first Constitution of California, in both English and Spanish.

Monterey hosted California's first constitutional convention in 1849, which composed the documents necessary to apply to the United States for statehood. Today Colton Hall houses a small museum, while adjacent buildings serve as the seat of local government, and the Monterey post office (opened in 1849).

Pioneer Francis Doud built Doud House in the 1860s, situated at the present-day 117 Van Buren Street. The house is one of the earliest and most well-preserved examples of an early wood frame residences in Monterey. Monterey was incorporated in 1890.

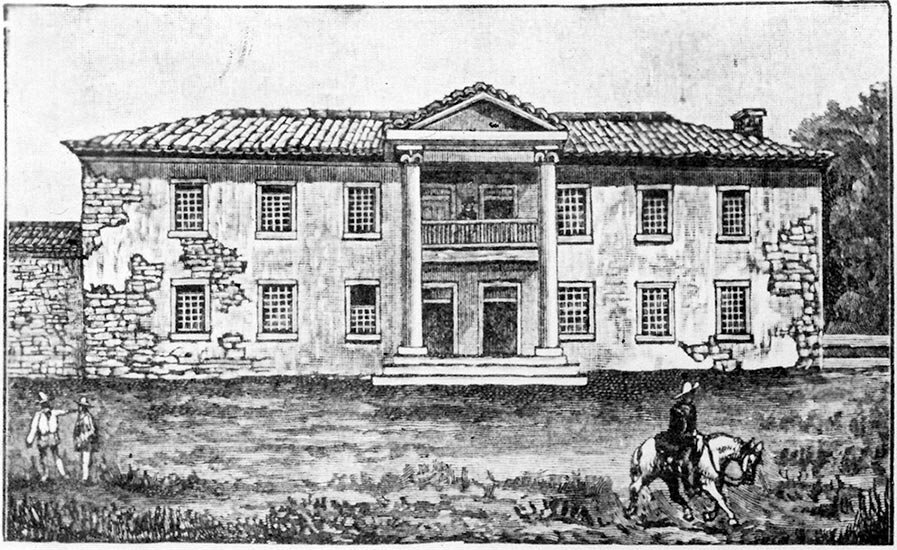
Colton Hall hosted the 1849 Constitutional Convention, which drafted the Constitution of California.

Thomas Albert Work built several of the buildings in Monterey, including the three-story Del Mar hotel in 1895, at the corner of Sixteenth, and in 1900, bought into the First National Bank in Monterey, acquiring it in 1906. He was president of the bank for more than 20 years.

Monterey had long been famous for the abundant fishery in Monterey Bay. That changed in the 1950s when the local fishery business collapsed due to overfishing. A few of the old fishermen's cabins from the early 20th century have been preserved as they originally stood along Cannery Row.

The city has a noteworthy history as a center for California painters in the late 19th and early 20th centuries. Such painters as Arthur Frank Mathews, Armin Hansen, Xavier Martinez, Rowena Meeks Abdy and Percy Gray lived or visited to pursue painting in the style of either En plein air or Tonalism.

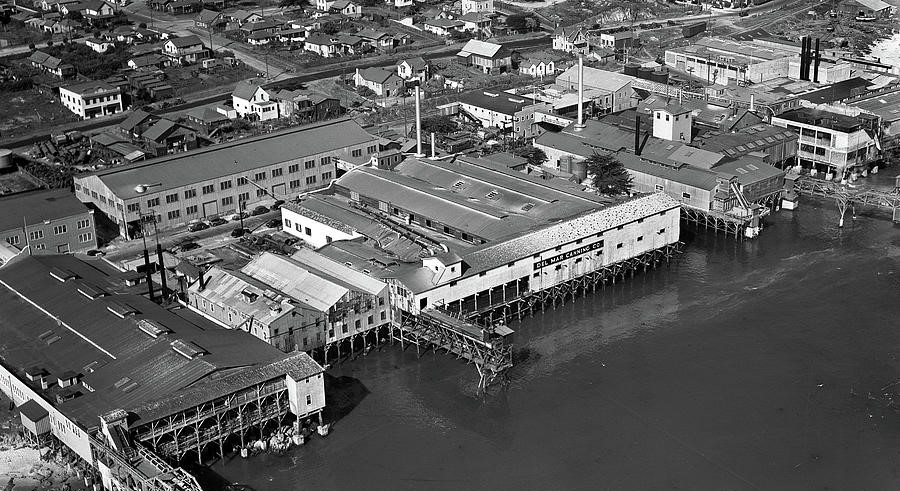
Cannery Row was once one of the most productive fish canning hubs in the world, until its collapse in the 1950s due to overfishing.

Many noted authors have also lived in and around Monterey, including Robert Louis Stevenson, John Steinbeck, Ed Ricketts, Robinson Jeffers, Robert A. Heinlein, and Henry Miller.

More recently, Monterey has been recognized for its significant involvement in post-secondary learning of languages other than English and its major role in delivering translation and interpretation services around the world. In November 1995, California Governor Pete Wilson proclaimed Monterey "the Language Capital of the World".

On June 7, 2021, the macOS Monterey operating system was presented at Apple's Worldwide Developers Conference (WWDC2021) and named after the Monterey region.

== Geography ==
=== Neighborhoods ===
In 1928, there were only two neighborhoods in Monterey; Old Monterey and New Monterey. Today, the old boundaries of Old Monterey contain Downtown and Old Town.

The current official neighborhood boundaries map governed by the Neighborhood and Community Improvement Program (NCIP) was adopted in 2021.

Monterey contains 15 officially designated neighborhoods that combine over eight square miles of land. The boundaries of these neighborhoods were created by the Neighborhood and Community Improvement Program (NCIP) in 2021. Each neighborhood is managed by a neighborhood association, but these neighborhood associations are not legal government entities of the City of Monterey. The federal government of the United States possesses much territory in Monterey, as does the State of California.

=== Old Monterey ===
Old Monterey is the more historic area of Monterey to the south and east of the Presidio of Monterey. On its eastern boundary is the Naval Postgraduate School. Old Monterey contains two officially designated neighborhoods; the residential area of Spaghetti Hill (officially known as Old Town), which slopes down the hillside from the Presidio of Monterey, named for its original Italian American residents, and the commercial business sector of Downtown Monterey.

From Fisherman's Wharf on its northern edge, Old Monterey stretches south until it hits the Mesas and the Vistas. Old Monterey contains Serra's Landing, the original landing site where Junípero Serra and his crew gathered for mass under a tree on December 17, 1602. Attractions in Old Monterey include Colton Hall, Monterey State Historic Park, Monterey Old Town Historic District, Custom House Plaza, Casa Serrano, Stanton Center, MyMuseum, the Royal Precidio Chapel, and Lake El Estero. The main thoroughfare of Old Monterey is Alvarado Street.

=== New Monterey ===
New Monterey lies on the north side of the Presidio of Monterey, containing the area of Cannery Row and the Monterey Bay Aquarium to its northeast, and bounded on its southern and western edge by the city of Pacific Grove. The majority of New Monterey is residential.

=== Ryan Ranch ===
Ryan Ranch is a neighborhood of Monterey. This neighborhood contains Ragsdale Drive and the former offices of the Monterey Herald, which are now a satellite campus of California State University, Monterey Bay hosting the headquarters of KAZU. The racetrack Laguna Seca is beyond the official borders of Ryan Ranch today.

=== Other neighborhoods ===
- Aguajito Oaks
- Alta Mesa
- Casanova Oak Knoll
- Del Monte Beach
- Del Monte Grove/Laguna Grande
- Deer Flats
- Fisherman's Flats
- Glenwood
- Monterey Vista
- Oak Grove
- Skyline Forest
- Villa Del Monte

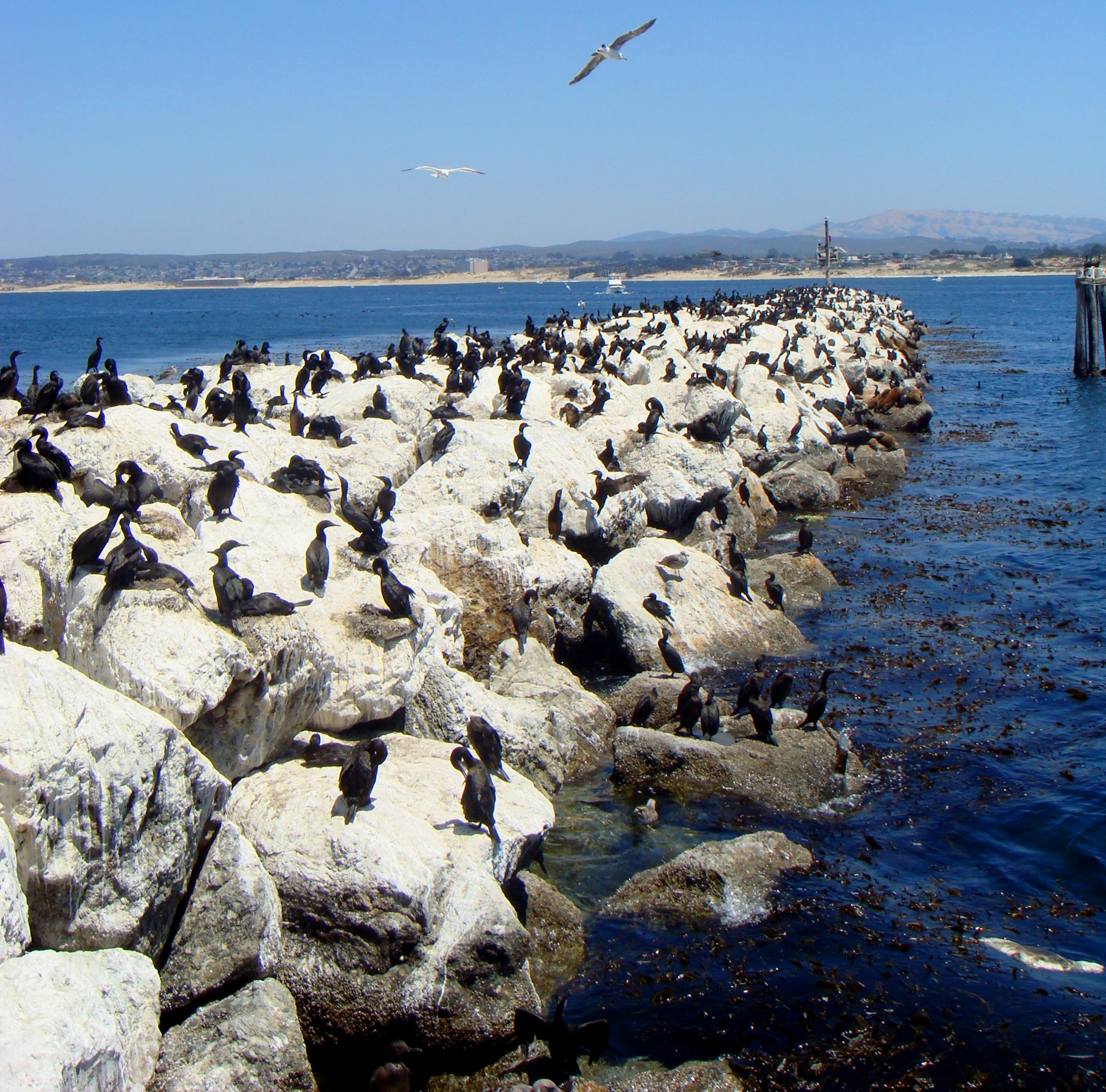
Rock sea wall near Coast Guard Station bordering Monterey Bay National Marine Sanctuary.

=== Ecology ===
According to the United States Census Bureau, the city has an area of 12.3 sq mi (31.8 km^{2}), of which 8.6 sq mi (22.4 km^{2}) is land and 3.6 sq mi (9.4 km^{2}) (29.49%) is water. Sand deposits in the northern coastal area comprise the sole known mineral resources.

Local soil is Quaternary Alluvium. Common soil series include the Baywood fine sand on the east side, Narlon loamy sand on the west side, Sheridan coarse sandy loam on hilly terrain, and the pale Tangair sand on hills supporting closed-cone pine habitat. The city is in a moderate to high seismic risk zone, the principal threat being the active San Andreas Fault approximately 26 miles (42 km) to the east. The Monterey Bay fault, which tracks three miles (4.8 km) to the north, is also active, as is the Palo Colorado fault seven miles (11 km) to the south. Also nearby, minor but potentially active, are the Berwick Canyon, Seaside, Tularcitos and Chupines faults.

Monterey Bay's maximum credible tsunami for a 100-year interval has been calculated as a wave nine feet (2.7 m) high. The considerable undeveloped area in the northwest part of the city has a high potential for landslides and erosion.

The city is adjacent to the Monterey Bay National Marine Sanctuary, a federally protected ocean area extending 276 mi (444 km) along the coast. Sometimes this sanctuary is confused with the local bay which is also termed Monterey Bay.

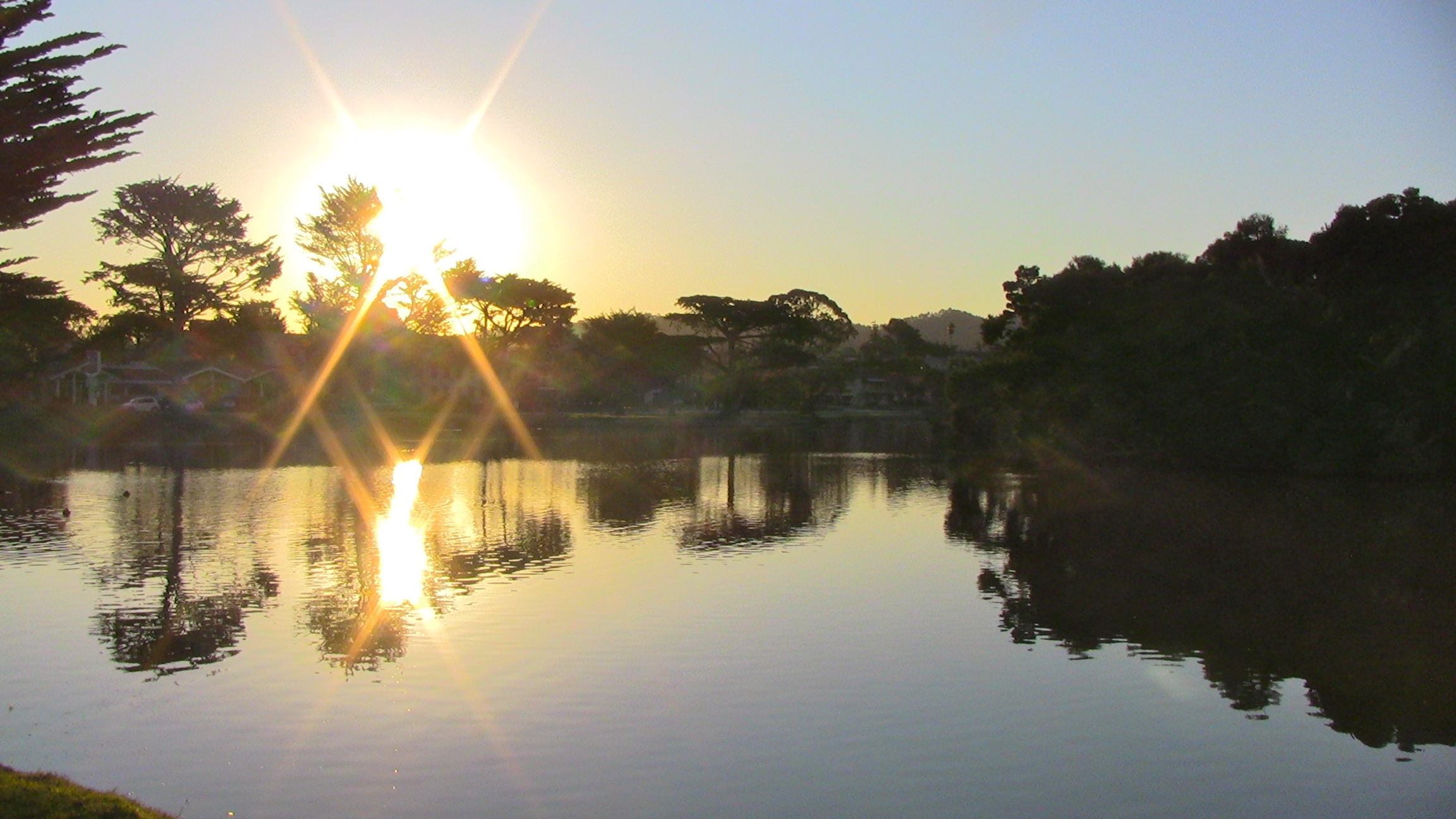
Lake El Estero

Soquel Canyon State Marine Conservation Area, Portuguese Ledge State Marine Conservation Area, Pacific Grove Marine Gardens State Marine Conservation Area, Lovers Point State Marine Reserve, Edward F. Ricketts State Marine Conservation Area and Asilomar State Marine Reserve are marine protected areas established by the state of California in Monterey Bay. Like underwater parks, these marine protected areas help conserve ocean wildlife and marine ecosystems.

The California sea otter, a threatened subspecies, inhabits the local Monterey Bay marine environment, and a field station of The Marine Mammal Center is located in Monterey to support sea rescue operations in this section of the California coast. The rare San Joaquin kit fox is found in Monterey's oak-forest and chaparral habitats. The chaparral, found mainly on the city's drier eastern slopes, hosts such plants as manzanita, chamise and ceanothus. Additional species of interest (that is, potential candidates for endangered species status) are the Salinas kangaroo rat and the silver-sided legless lizard.

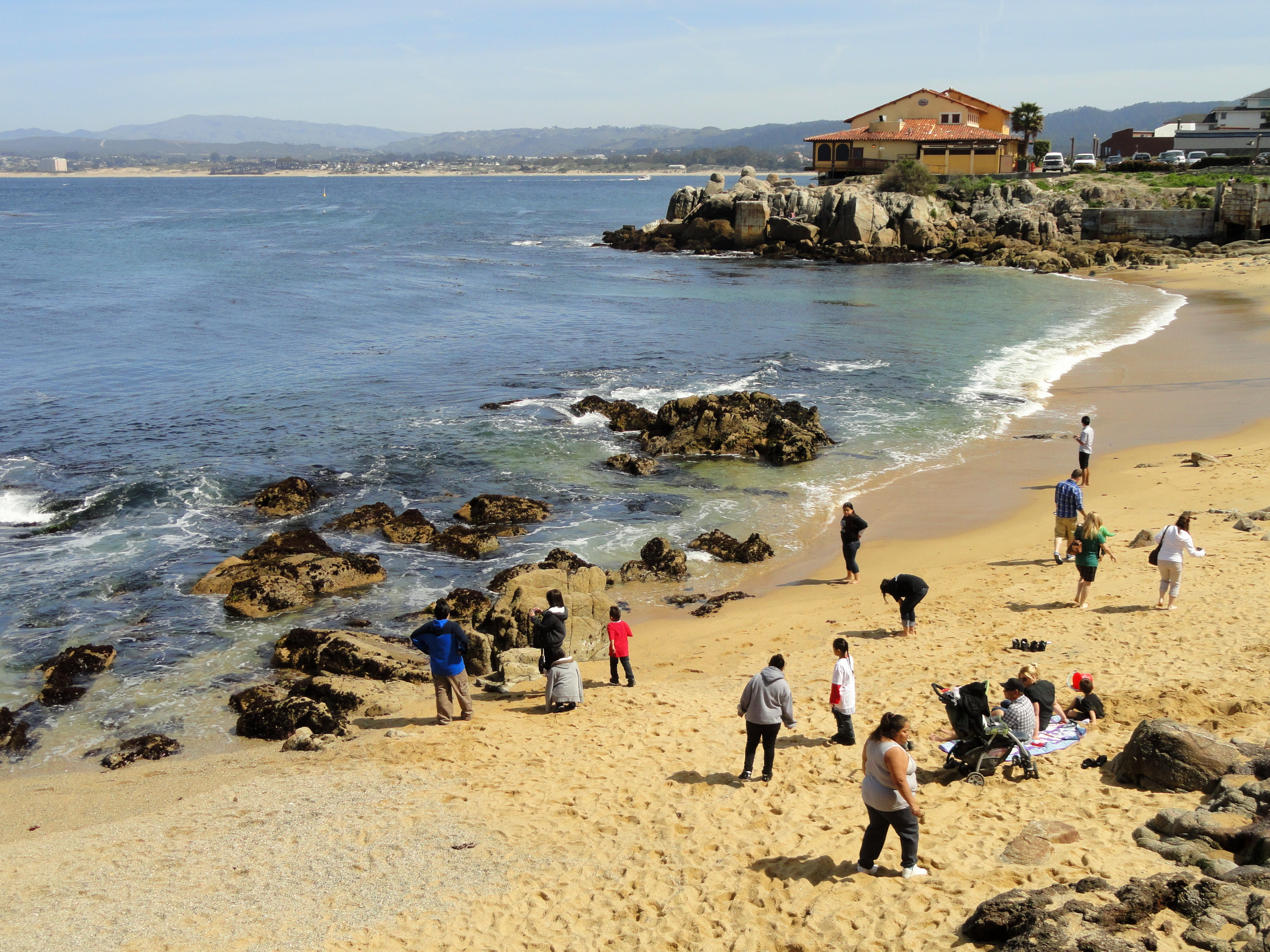
McAbee Beach.

There is a variety of natural habitat in Monterey: littoral zone and sand dunes; closed-cone pine forest; and Monterey Cypress. There are no dairy farms in the city of Monterey; the semi-hard cheese known as Monterey Jack originated in nearby Carmel Valley, California, and is named after businessman and land speculator David Jacks.

The closed-cone pine habitat is dominated by Monterey pine, Knobcone pine and Bishop pine, and contains the rare Monterey manzanita. In the early 20th century the botanist Willis Linn Jepson characterized Monterey Peninsula's forests as the "most important silva ever", and encouraged Samuel F.B. Morse (a century younger than the inventor Samuel F. B. Morse) of the Del Monte Properties Company to explore the possibilities of preserving the unique forest communities. The dune area is no less important, as it hosts endangered species such as the vascular plants Seaside birds beak, Hickman's potentilla and Eastwood's Ericameria. Rare plants also inhabit the chaparral: Hickman's onion, Yadon's piperia (Piperia yadonii) and Sandmat manzanita. Other rare plants in Monterey include Hutchinson's delphinium, Tidestrom lupine, Gardner's yampah and Knotweed, the latter perhaps already extinct.

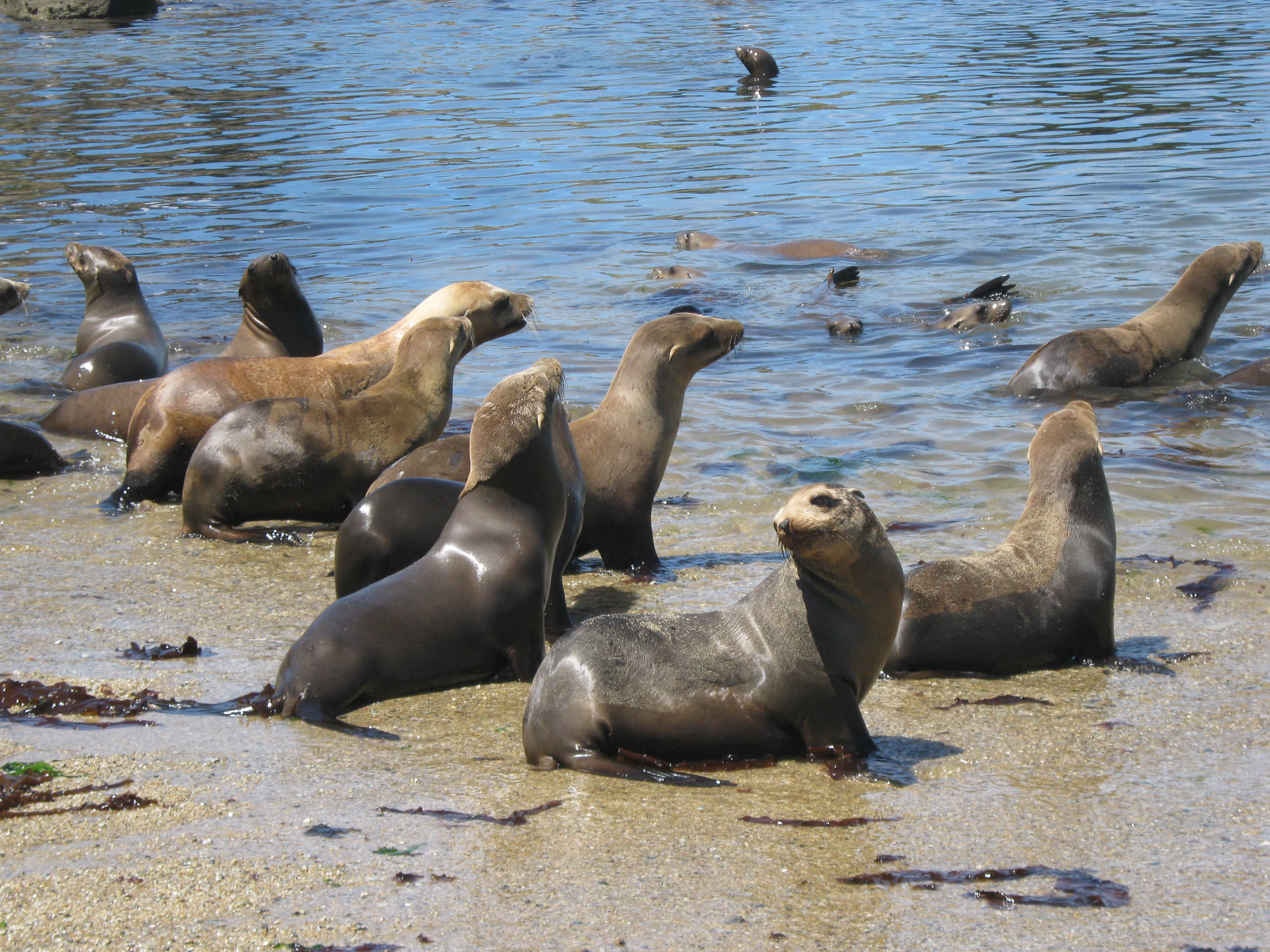
California sea lions in Monterey.

Monterey's noise pollution has been mapped to define the principal sources of noise and to ascertain the areas of the population exposed to significant levels. Principal sources are the Monterey Regional Airport, State Route 1 and major arterial streets such as Munras Avenue, Fremont Street, Del Monte Boulevard, and Camino Aguajito. While most of Monterey is a quiet residential city, a moderate number of people in the northern part of the city are exposed to aircraft noise at levels in excess of 60 dB on the Community Noise Equivalent Level (CNEL) scale. The most intense source is State Route 1: all residents exposed to levels greater than 65 CNEL—about 1,600 people—live near State Route 1 or one of the principal arterial streets.

=== Climate ===
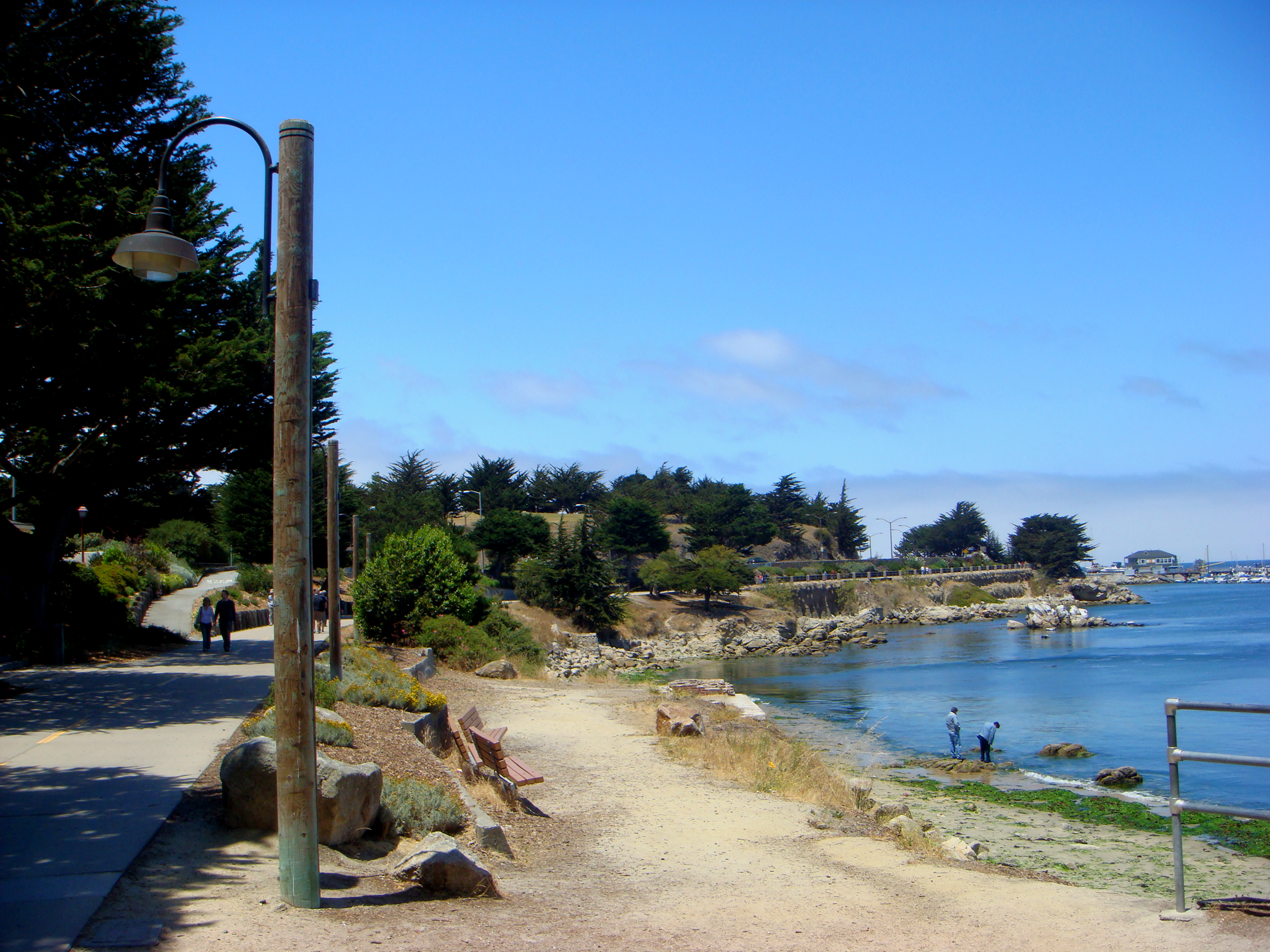
Portion of the Monterey Peninsula Recreational Trail, between Monterey Harbor and the Municipal Marina.

Monterey's climate is regulated by its proximity to the Pacific Ocean, resulting in a warm-summer Mediterranean climate (Köppen climate classification: Csb) although with temperatures resembling an oceanic climate. The city's average high temperatures range from 58.2 °F (14.6 °C) in December to 68.2 °F (20.1 °C) in September. Average annual precipitation is 17.11 inches (435 mm), with most occurring between October and April; little to no precipitation falls during the summer. There is an average of 72.1 days with measurable precipitation annually. Average temperatures in Monterey are similar to average temperatures found in other parts of the world with oceanic climates. Summers in Monterey are often cool and foggy. The cold surface waters cause even summer nights to be unusually cool for the latitude; this is in distinct contrast to the much warmer summer days and nights of the U.S. east coast. The extreme moderation of summer temperatures is further underlined by the fact that Monterey is geographically situated at a similar latitude within California as Death Valley — one of the hottest areas in the world.

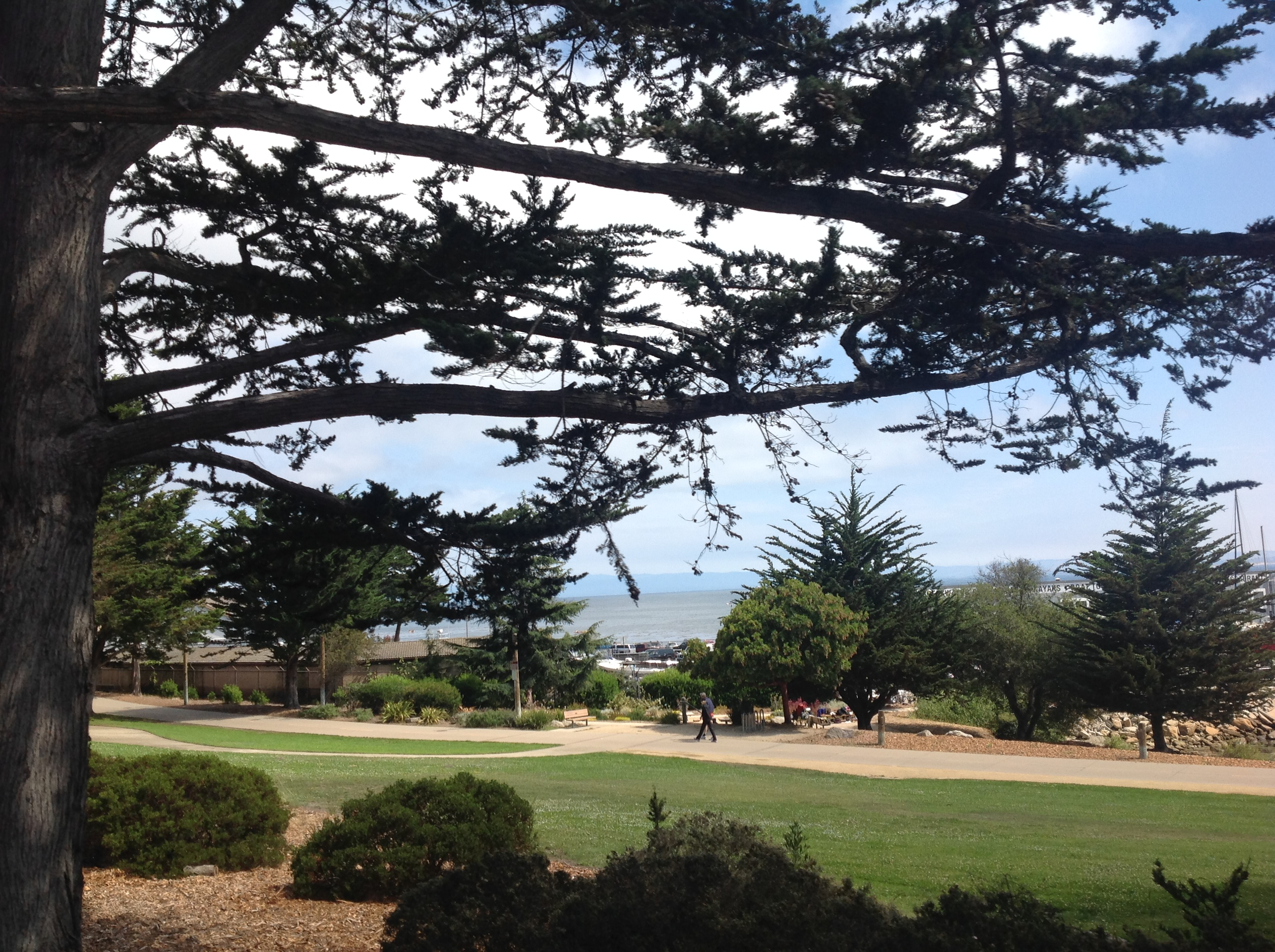
San Carlos Beach Park.

During winter, snow occasionally falls in the higher elevations of the Santa Lucia Mountains and Gabilan Mountains that overlook Monterey, but snow in Monterey itself is extremely rare. A few unusual events in January 1962, February 1976, and December 1997 brought a light coating of snow to Monterey. In March 2006, a total of 3.2 inches (8.1 cm) fell in Monterey, including 2.2 inches (0.056 m) on March 10, 2006. The snowfall on January 21, 1962, of 1.5 inches (0.038 m), is remembered for delaying the Bing Crosby golf tournament in nearby Pebble Beach.

The record lowest temperature was 26 °F (−3.3 °C) on December 24, 1998, and January 13, 2007. Annually, there are an average of 1.3 days with highs that reach or exceed 90 °F or 32.2 °C and an average of 1.5 days with lows at or below the freezing mark.

Combining the records for Monterey and Monterey WFO, the wettest "rain year" on record has been from July 1997 to June 1998 with 47.15 inches or 1,197.6 millimetres of precipitation, and the driest from July 2013 to June 2014 with 7.67 inches or 194.8 millimetres. The most precipitation in one month was 13.73 inches or 348.7 millimetres in February 1998. The record maximum 24-hour precipitation was 3.55 inches or 90.2 millimetres on December 11, 2014.

Climate data for Monterey, California, 1991–2020 normals, extremes 1995–2019
Month	Jan	Feb	Mar	Apr	May	Jun	Jul	Aug	Sep	Oct	Nov	Dec	Year
Record high °F (°C)	80 (27)	86 (30)	86 (30)	92 (33)	97 (36)	96 (36)	86 (30)	91 (33)	101 (38)	104 (40)	91 (33)	79 (26)	104 (40)
Mean maximum °F (°C)	73.4 (23.0)	73.8 (23.2)	76.0 (24.4)	78.4 (25.8)	78.7 (25.9)	79.2 (26.2)	77.3 (25.2)	79.7 (26.5)	84.7 (29.3)	86.6 (30.3)	79.0 (26.1)	71.0 (21.7)	78.15 (25.64)
Mean daily maximum °F (°C)	59.3 (15.2)	59.5 (15.3)	60.6 (15.9)	61.5 (16.4)	62.9 (17.2)	64.8 (18.2)	65.8 (18.8)	66.9 (19.4)	68.2 (20.1)	66.9 (19.4)	62.5 (16.9)	58.2 (14.6)	63.1 (17.3)
Daily mean °F (°C)	51.2 (10.7)	51.9 (11.1)	53.2 (11.8)	54.4 (12.4)	56.5 (13.6)	58.6 (14.8)	60.1 (15.6)	60.9 (16.1)	61.1 (16.2)	58.8 (14.9)	54.2 (12.3)	50.4 (10.2)	55.9 (13.3)
Mean daily minimum °F (°C)	43.1 (6.2)	44.4 (6.9)	45.8 (7.7)	47.3 (8.5)	50.2 (10.1)	52.4 (11.3)	54.4 (12.4)	54.9 (12.7)	54.1 (12.3)	50.8 (10.4)	46.0 (7.8)	42.7 (5.9)	48.8 (9.3)
Mean minimum °F (°C)	34.1 (1.2)	37.0 (2.8)	38.4 (3.6)	41.0 (5.0)	44.2 (6.8)	47.1 (8.4)	50.1 (10.1)	50.2 (10.1)	48.2 (9.0)	43.9 (6.6)	38.2 (3.4)	33.6 (0.9)	31.7 (−0.2)
Record low °F (°C)	26 (−3)	33 (1)	35 (2)	38 (3)	41 (5)	44 (7)	47 (8)	47 (8)	44 (7)	40 (4)	33 (1)	26 (−3)	26 (−3)
Average precipitation inches (mm)	3.45 (88)	3.46 (88)	2.89 (73)	1.15 (29)	0.50 (13)	0.14 (3.6)	0.02 (0.51)	0.09 (2.3)	0.08 (2.0)	0.83 (21)	1.64 (42)	2.86 (73)	17.11 (435)
Average precipitation days (≥ 0.01 in)	10.7	11.6	10.1	7.0	3.9	2.1	1.1	2.0	1.5	4.2	7.7	10.2	72.1
Source 1: NOAA
Source 2: National Weather Service

== Demographics ==
Historical population
Census	Pop.	Note	%±
1850	1,092		—
1860	1,653		51.4%
1870	1,112		−32.7%
1880	1,396		25.5%
1890	1,662		19.1%
1900	1,748		5.2%
1910	4,923		181.6%
1920	5,479		11.3%
1930	9,141		66.8%
1940	10,084		10.3%
1950	16,205		60.7%
1960	22,618		39.6%
1970	26,302		16.3%
1980	27,558		4.8%
1990	31,954		16.0%
2000	29,674		−7.1%
2010	27,810		−6.3%
2020	30,218		8.7%
2024 (est.)	29,015	▼	−4.0%
U.S. Decennial Census

=== Racial and ethnic composition ===
Monterey city, California – Racial composition
Race (NH = Non-Hispanic)	2020	2010	2000	1990	1980
White alone (NH)	63.1% (19,053)	71.1% (19,786)	75% (22,246)	81.8% (26,151)	84.9% (23,399)
Black alone (NH)	2.9% (871)	2.6% (734)	2.4% (716)	2.8% (887)	2.7% (739)
American Indian alone (NH)	0.3% (101)	0.4% (99)	0.4% (122)	0.4% (138)	0.4% (107)
Asian alone (NH)	7.8% (2,353)	7.8% (2,157)	7.3% (2,171)	7% (2,248)	5.8% (1,602)
Pacific Islander alone (NH)	0.7% (209)	0.3% (89)	0.3% (83)		
Other race alone (NH)	0.5% (156)	0.2% (58)	0.2% (64)	0.1% (35)	0.3% (75)
Multiracial (NH)	6.1% (1,857)	3.8% (1,070)	3.5% (1,050)	—	—
Hispanic/Latino (any race)	18.6% (5,618)	13.7% (3,817)	10.9% (3,222)	7.8% (2,495)	5.9% (1,636)

=== Religion ===
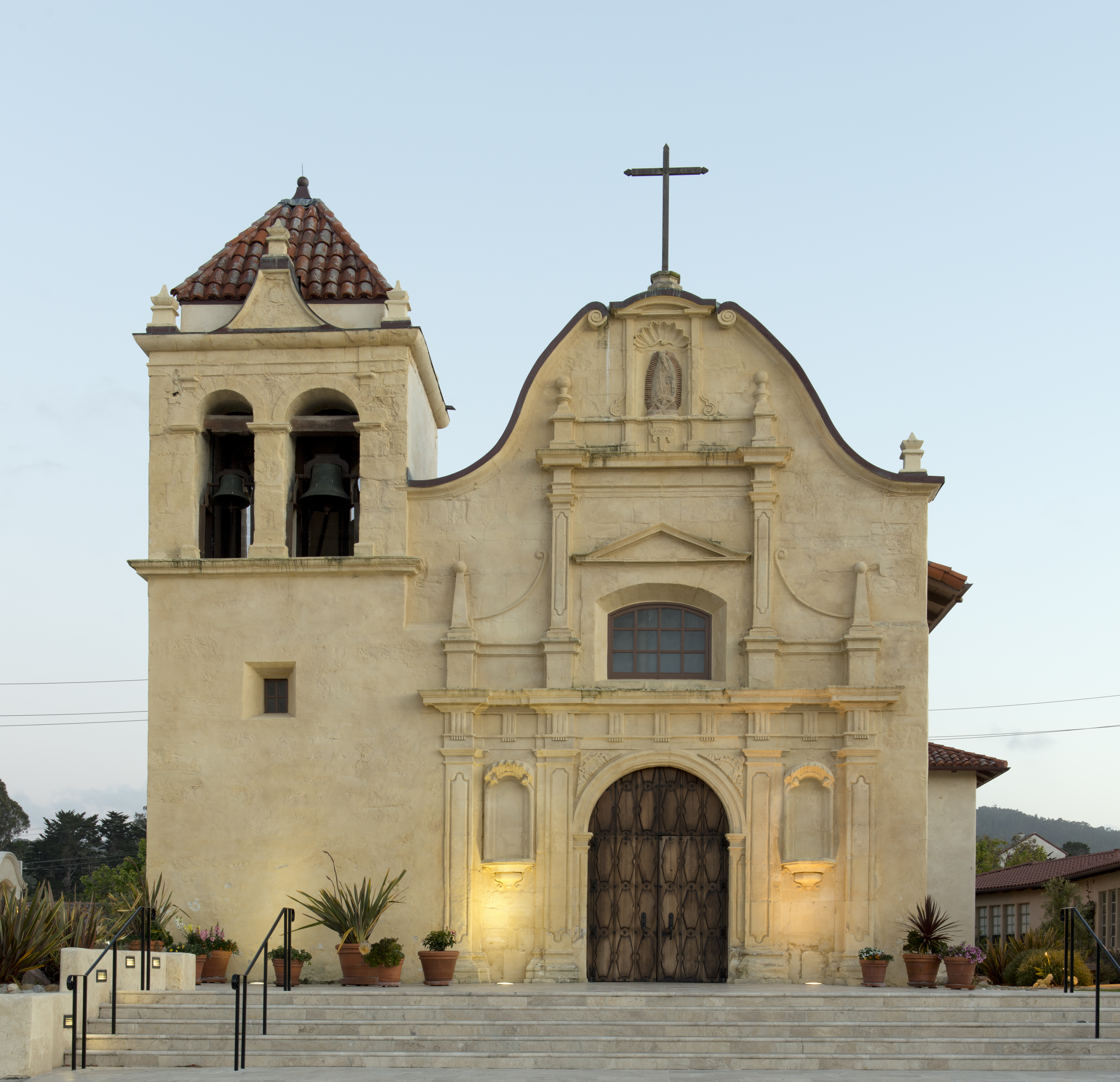
The Cathedral of San Carlos Borromeo is the oldest cathedral in the United States, as well as the oldest stone building in California.

The headquarters of the Roman Catholic Diocese of Monterey in California is in Monterey, and one of the relatively few Oratorian communities in the United States is located in the city. The city is adjacent to the historic Catholic Carmel Mission.

=== 2020 census ===
As of the 2020 census, Monterey had a population of 30,218. The age distribution was 12.8% under the age of 18, 16.0% aged 18 to 24, 30.4% aged 25 to 44, 20.9% aged 45 to 64, and 19.9% who were 65 years of age or older. The median age was 36.7 years. For every 100 females, there were 103.2 males, and for every 100 females age 18 and over, there were 103.6 males age 18 and over. The 2020 census reported that 100.0% of residents lived in urban areas and 0.0% lived in rural areas.

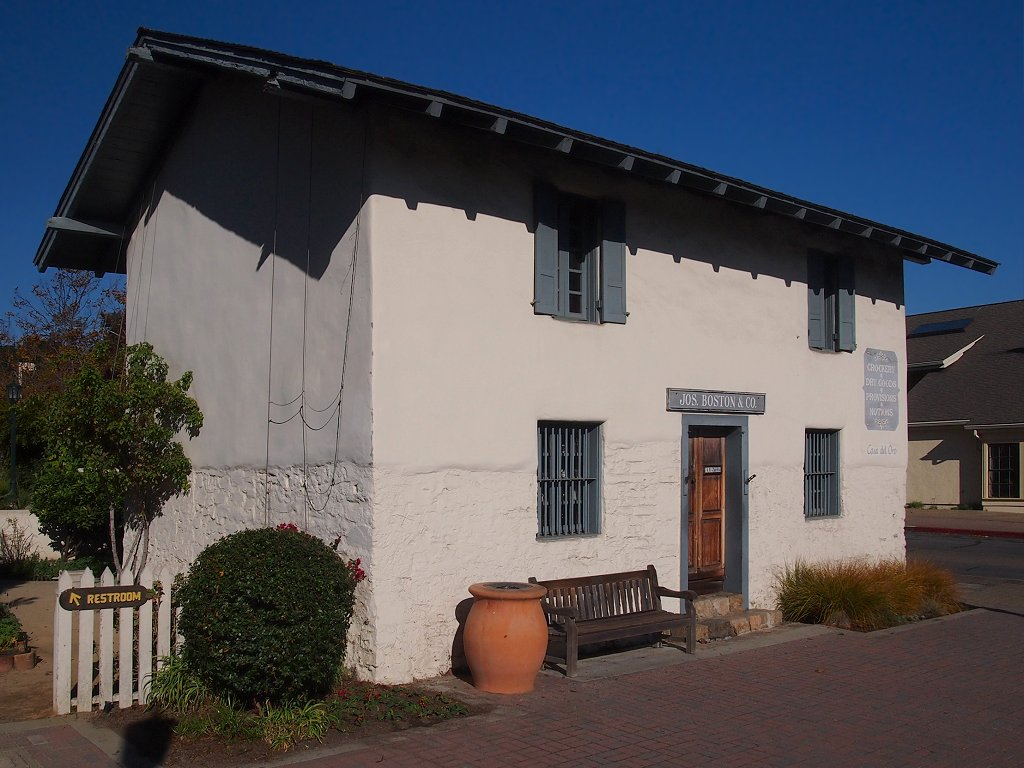
Casa del Oro, built in 1849.

There were 12,399 households, of which 19.1% had children under the age of 18 living in them. Of all households, 38.1% were married-couple households, 7.8% were cohabiting couple households, 31.3% had a female householder with no partner present, and 22.7% had a male householder with no partner present. About 38.1% of households were one person, and 14.8% were one person aged 65 or older. The average household size was 2.09. There were 6,284 families (50.7% of all households). Of the population, 85.6% lived in households, 13.1% lived in non-institutionalized group quarters, and 1.3% were institutionalized.

There were 13,787 housing units, of which 10.1% were vacant. The homeowner vacancy rate was 0.7% and the rental vacancy rate was 6.0%.

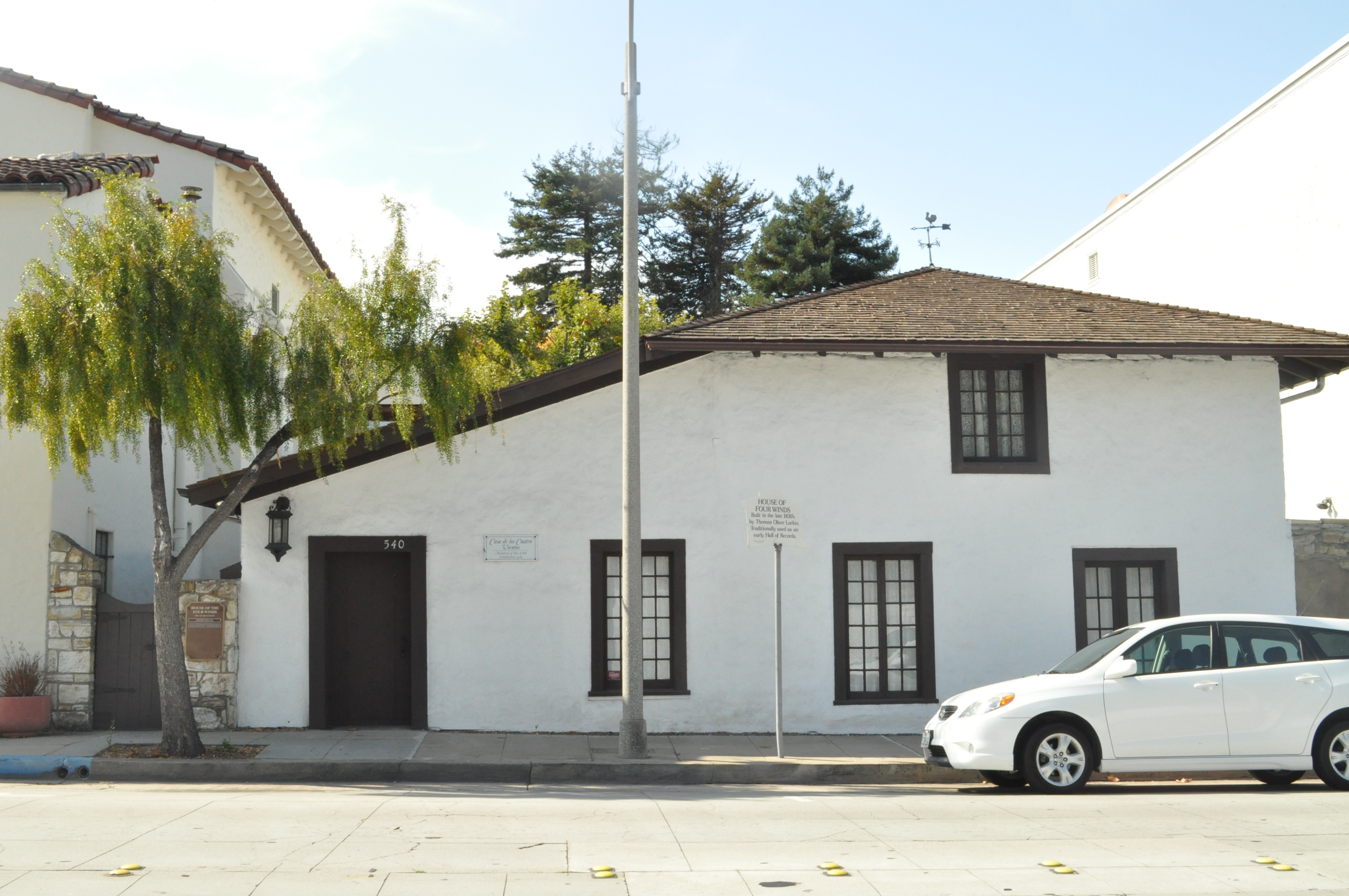
Casa de los Vientos, built in 1835.

The most commonly reported ancestries were English (14.8%), German (14.1%), Irish (13.6%), Mexican (11.9%), Italian (8.8%), and Scottish (4.3%).

=== 2023 ACS estimates ===
In 2023, the US Census Bureau estimated that the median household income was $104,110, and the per capita income was $62,541. About 8.0% of families and 10.5% of the population were below the poverty line.

=== 2010 census ===
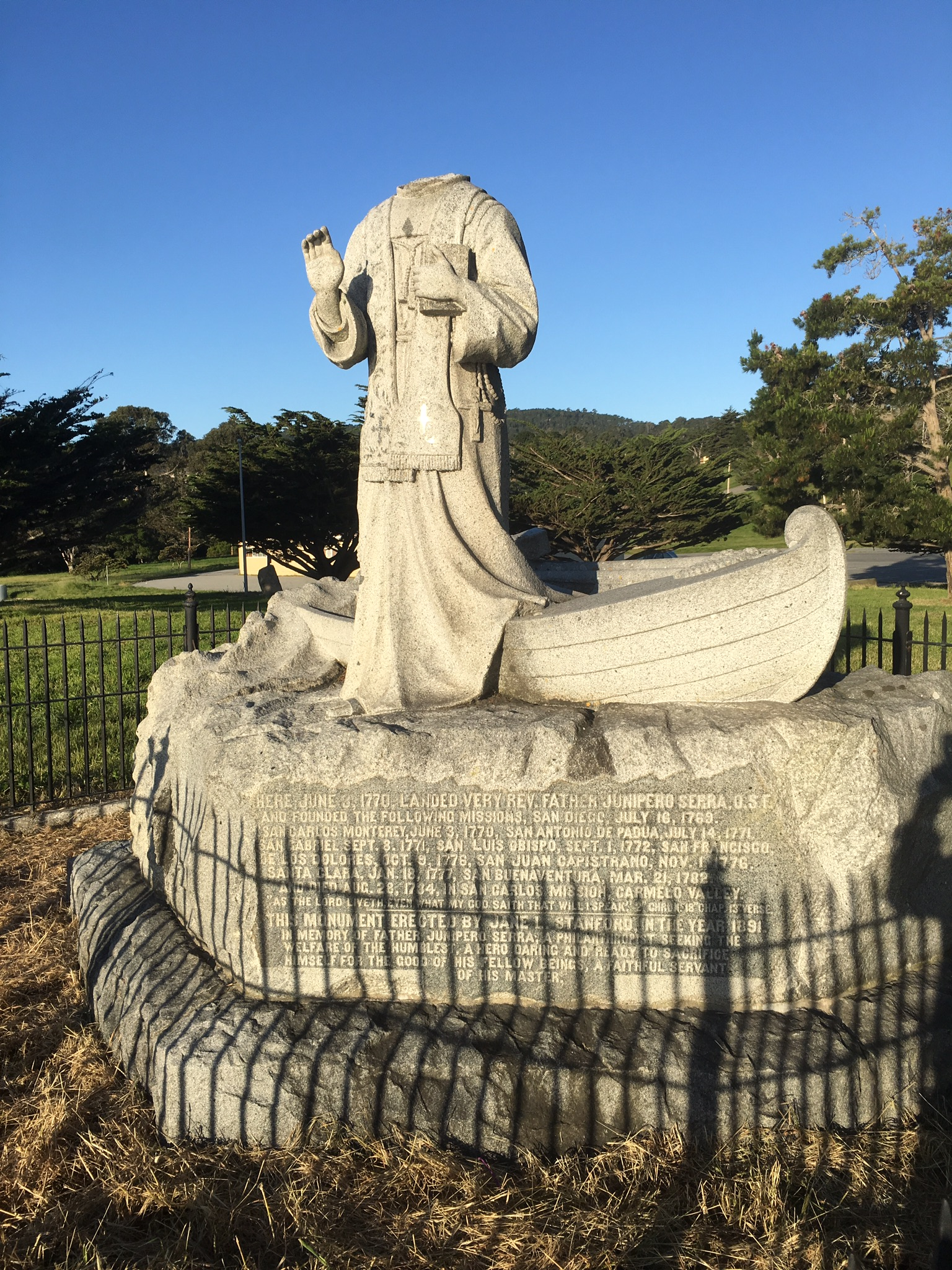
The Junípero Serra Monument, erected in 1891, has been decapitated since it was vandalized in 2015.

The 2010 United States census reported that Monterey had a population of 27,810. The population density was 2,364.0 inhabitants per square mile (912.7/km^{2}). The racial makeup of Monterey was 21,788 (78.3%) White, 777 (2.8%) African American, 149 (0.5%) Native American, 2,204 (7.9%) Asian, 91 (0.3%) Pacific Islander, 1,382 (5.0%) from other races, and 1,419 (5.1%) from two or more races. There were 3,817 people (13.7%) of Hispanic or Latino origin, of any race.

The Census reported that 25,307 people (91.0% of the population) lived in households, 2,210 (7.9%) lived in non-institutionalized group quarters, and 293 (1.1%) were institutionalized.

There were 12,184 households, out of which 2,475 (20.3%) had children under the age of 18 living in them, 4,690 (38.5%) were opposite-sex married couples living together, 902 (7.4%) had a female householder with no husband present, 371 (3.0%) had a male householder with no wife present. 4,778 households (39.2%) were made up of individuals, and 1,432 (11.8%) had someone living alone who was 65 years of age or older. The average household size was 2.08. There were 5,963 families (48.9% of all households); the average family size was 2.81.

There were 4,266 residents (15.3%) under the age of 18, 3,841 (13.8%) aged 18 to 24, 8,474 (30.5%) aged 25 to 44, 6,932 (24.9%) aged 45 to 64, and 4,297 (15.5%) who were 65 years of age or older. The median age was 36.9 years. For every 100 females, there were 101.2 males. For every 100 females age 18 and over, there were 100.6 males.

There were 13,584 housing units at an average density of 1,154.7 per square mile (445.8/km^{2}), of which 4,360 (35.8%) were owner-occupied, and 7,824 (64.2%) were occupied by renters. The homeowner vacancy rate was 2.0%; the rental vacancy rate was 6.5%. 9,458 people (34.0% of the population) lived in owner-occupied housing units and 15,849 people (57.0%) lived in rental housing units.

== Economy ==
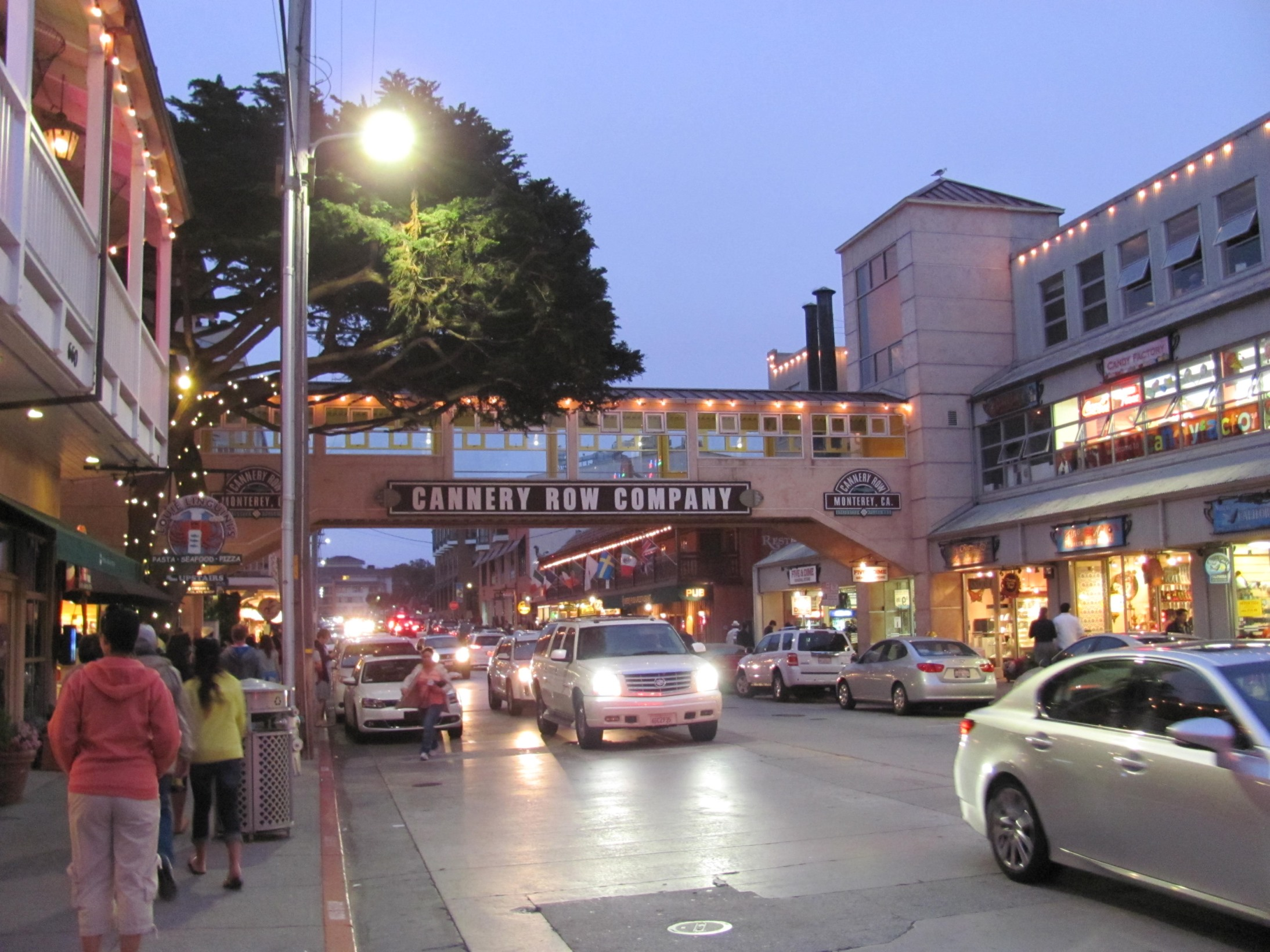
Cannery Row is a popular tourist destination in Monterey.

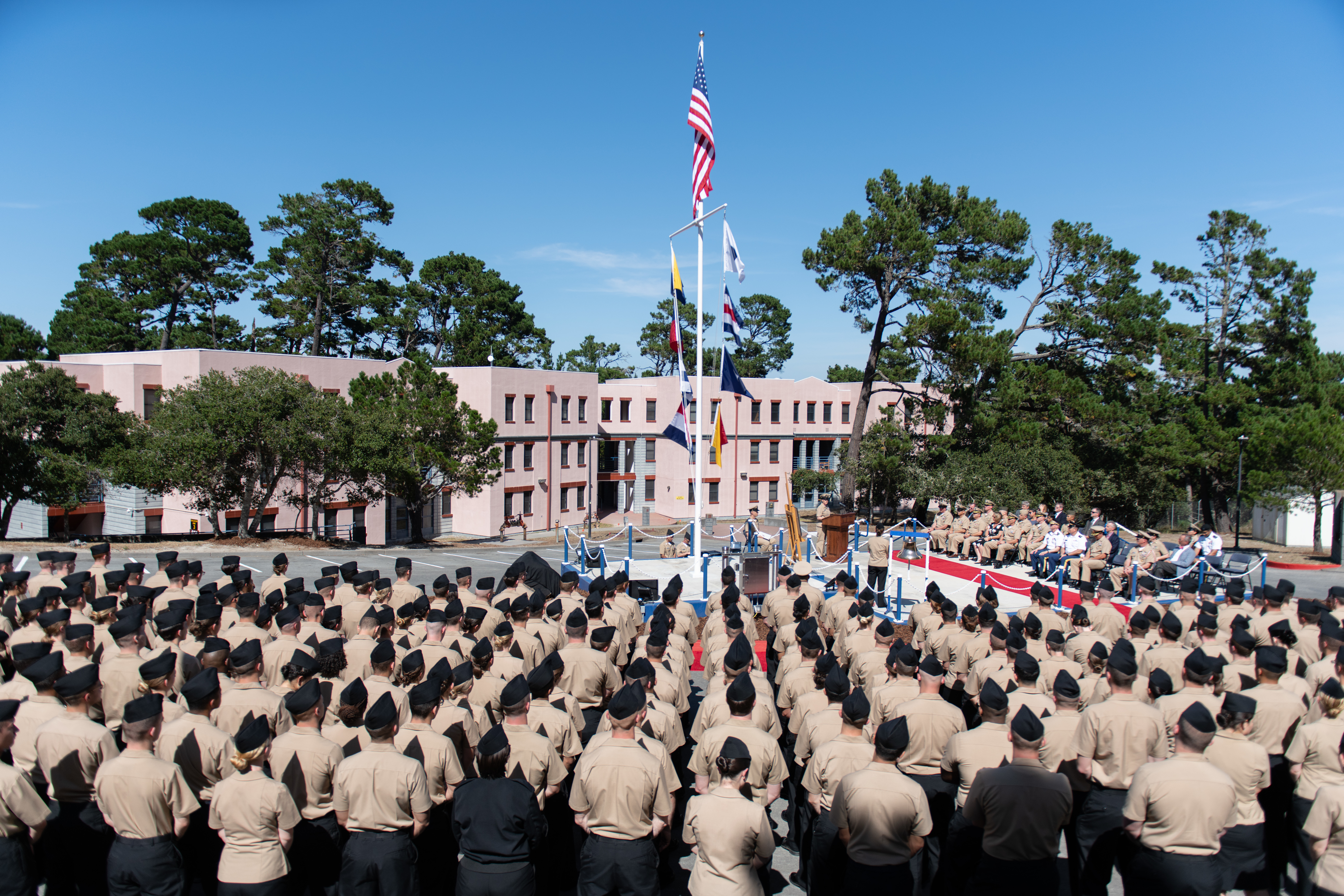
Established by the Spanish in 1770, the Presidio of Monterey is a military hub for the Monterey Bay region.

According to the city's 2015 Comprehensive Annual Financial Report, the top private-sector employers in the city are (in alphabetical order):

Employer	# of Employees
Community Hospital of the Monterey Peninsula	1,000 to 4,999
Ctb Mc Graw-Hill LLC	500 to 999
Dole Fresh Vegetables	250 to 499
Hyatt Regency Monterey Hotel & Spa	250 to 499
Language Line	250 to 499
Macy's	250 to 499
Monterey Bay Aquarium	250 to 499
Middlebury Institute of International Studies at Monterey	250 to 499
Monterey Plaza Hotel & Spa	250 to 499
Portola Hotel & Spa	250 to 499

The top public-sector employers are (in alphabetical order):

Employer	# of Employees
City of Monterey	250 to 499
Defense Language Institute	1,000 to 4,999
Monterey Peninsula College	500 to 999
Monterey-Salinas Transit	250–499
Naval Postgraduate School	1,000 to 4,999

Other private-sector employers based in Monterey include Monterey Peninsula Unified School District, and Mapleton Communications. Additional military facilities in Monterey include the Fleet Numerical Meteorology and Oceanography Center, and the United States Naval Research Laboratory – Monterey.

== Arts and culture ==
=== Attractions ===
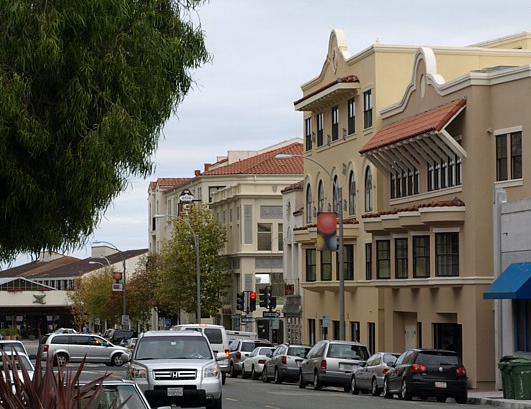
Calle Principal in Downtown Monterey. Downtown is home to numerous examples of historic Californian architecture.

Monterey is well known for the abundance and diversity of its marine life, which includes sea lions, sea otters, harbor seals, bat rays, kelp forests, pelicans and dolphins and several species of whales. Only a few miles offshore is the Monterey Canyon, the largest and deepest (at 2 mi or 3.2 km) underwater canyon off the Pacific coast of North America, which grants scientists access to the deep sea within hours. The cornucopia of marine life makes Monterey a popular destination for scuba divers of all abilities ranging from novice to expert. Scuba classes are held at San Carlos State Beach, which has been a favorite with divers since the 1960s. The Monterey Bay Aquarium on Cannery Row is one of the largest aquariums in North America, and several marine science laboratories, including Hopkins Marine Station are located in the area.

Monterey is home to several museums and more than thirty carefully preserved historic buildings. Most of these buildings are adobes built in the mid-1800s. Some are museums and open to the public, including the Cooper Molera Adobe, Robert Louis Stevenson House, Casa Serrano, The Perry House, The Customs House, Colton Hall, Mayo Hayes O'Donnell Library and The First Brick House. Many others including Casa Amesti are only open during Monterey's annual adobe tour. The Monterey Museum of Art specializes in Early California Impressionist painting, photography, and contemporary art. Other youth-oriented art attractions include MY Museum, a children's museum, and YAC, an arts organization for teens.

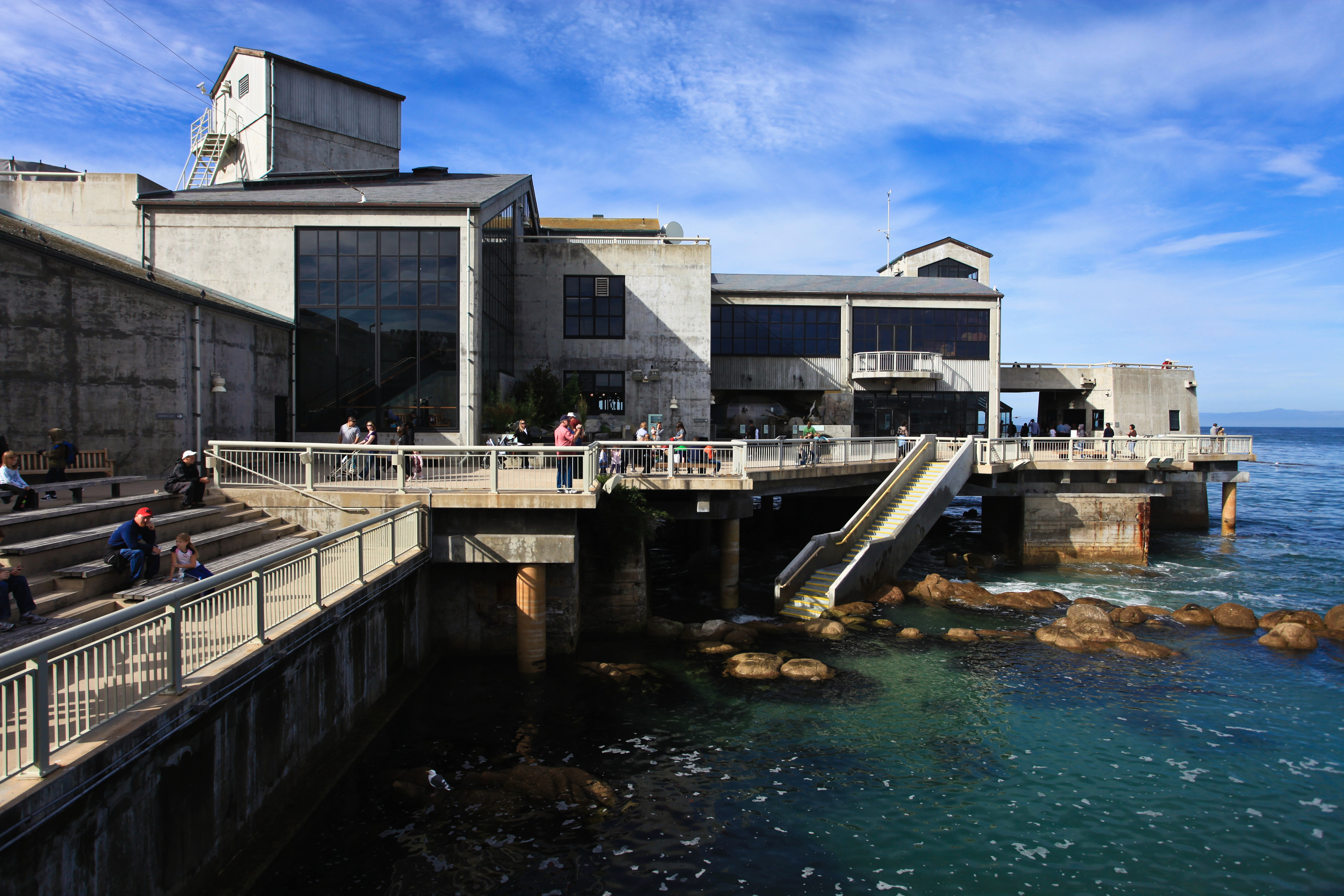
Monterey Bay Aquarium, one of the most visited aquariums in the country.

What may be the only whalebone sidewalk still in existence in the United States lies in front of the Old Whaling Station, left by New England whalers while California was still part of New Spain.

Cannery Row is a historic industrial district west of downtown Monterey. Several companies operated large sardine canneries and packing houses from the 1920s until the 1950s when the sardines were overfished and the industry collapsed. The neighborhood was a minor tourist attraction until the late 1980s when the Monterey Bay Aquarium bought the former Hovden Cannery and built their aquarium around it. The Aquarium revitalized the neighborhood and it is now the number one tourist destination on the Monterey Peninsula. It is home to more than 600 species of plants and animals. Several of the canneries burnt down in the 1970s and some of their empty foundations are still visible along the oceanfront. A free heritage trolley transports visitors between downtown Monterey and the Aquarium during the summer.

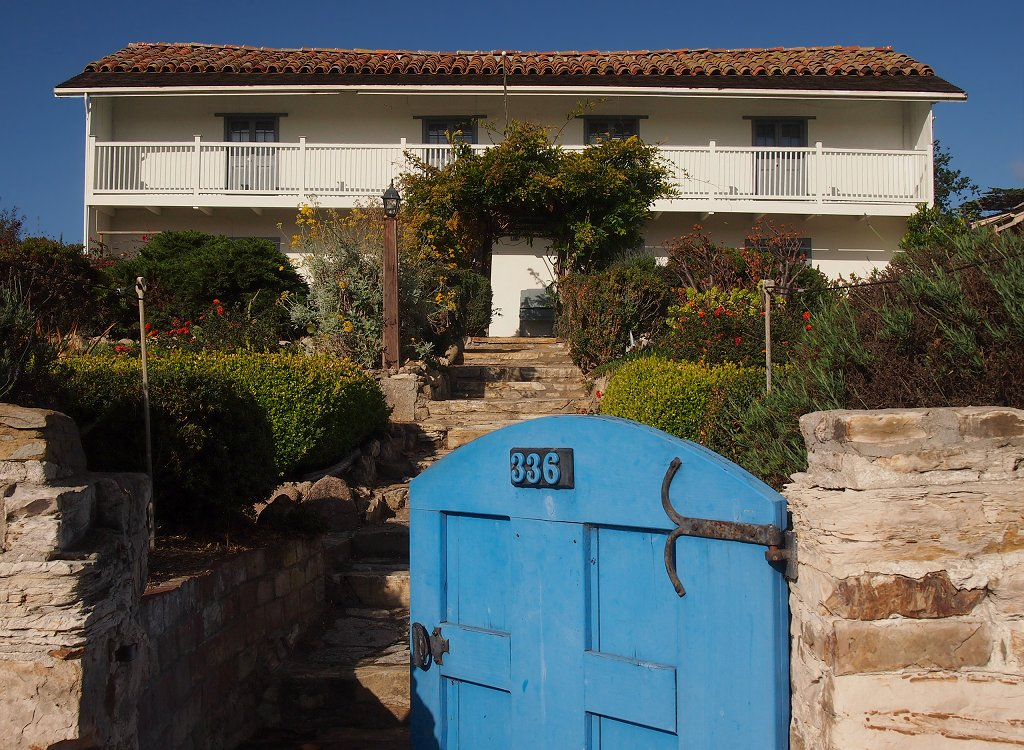
Casa Soberanes, a Monterey Colonial style house built by Rafael Estrada in the 1840s.

Once called Ocean View Boulevard, the street was renamed Cannery Row in 1953 in honor of writer John Steinbeck, who had written a well-known novel of the same name. It has now become a tourist attraction with numerous establishments located in former cannery buildings, including Cannery Row Antique Mall which is located in the most historically intact cannery building open to the public. Other historical buildings in this district include Wing Chong Market, The American Tin Cannery which is a shopping mall, Doc Rickett's lab, next door to the aquarium and only open to the public a few times a year, and some of the water tanks written about by Steinbeck. A few privately owned and operated fishing companies still exist on Cannery Row, housed on piers located a short distance from the historic district frequented by tourists. Cannery Row is now considered the historic cannery district from Foam St. to the ocean.

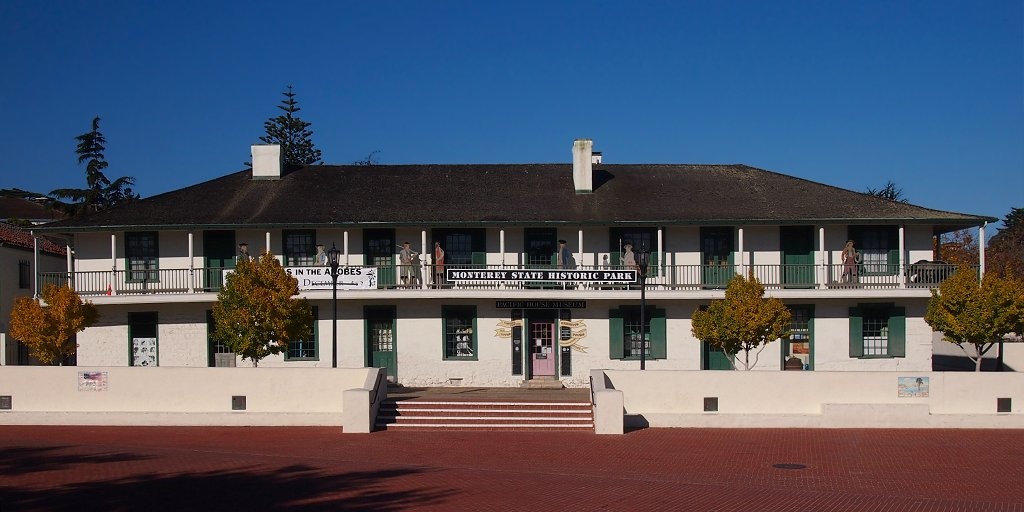
Pacific House Museum.

The Governor Juan Bautista Alvarado House is California Historical Landmark number #348. The adobe house was seriously damaged in January 2023 during the 2022–2023 California floods.

Lake El Estero is a popular Monterey park. Recreation opportunities include paddleboats, the Dennis the Menace Park (named after the comics character Dennis the Menace), and a skate park designed by local skaters. Birders are especially fond of this park due to its easy accessibility and the diversity of birdlife it attracts.

=== Arts ===
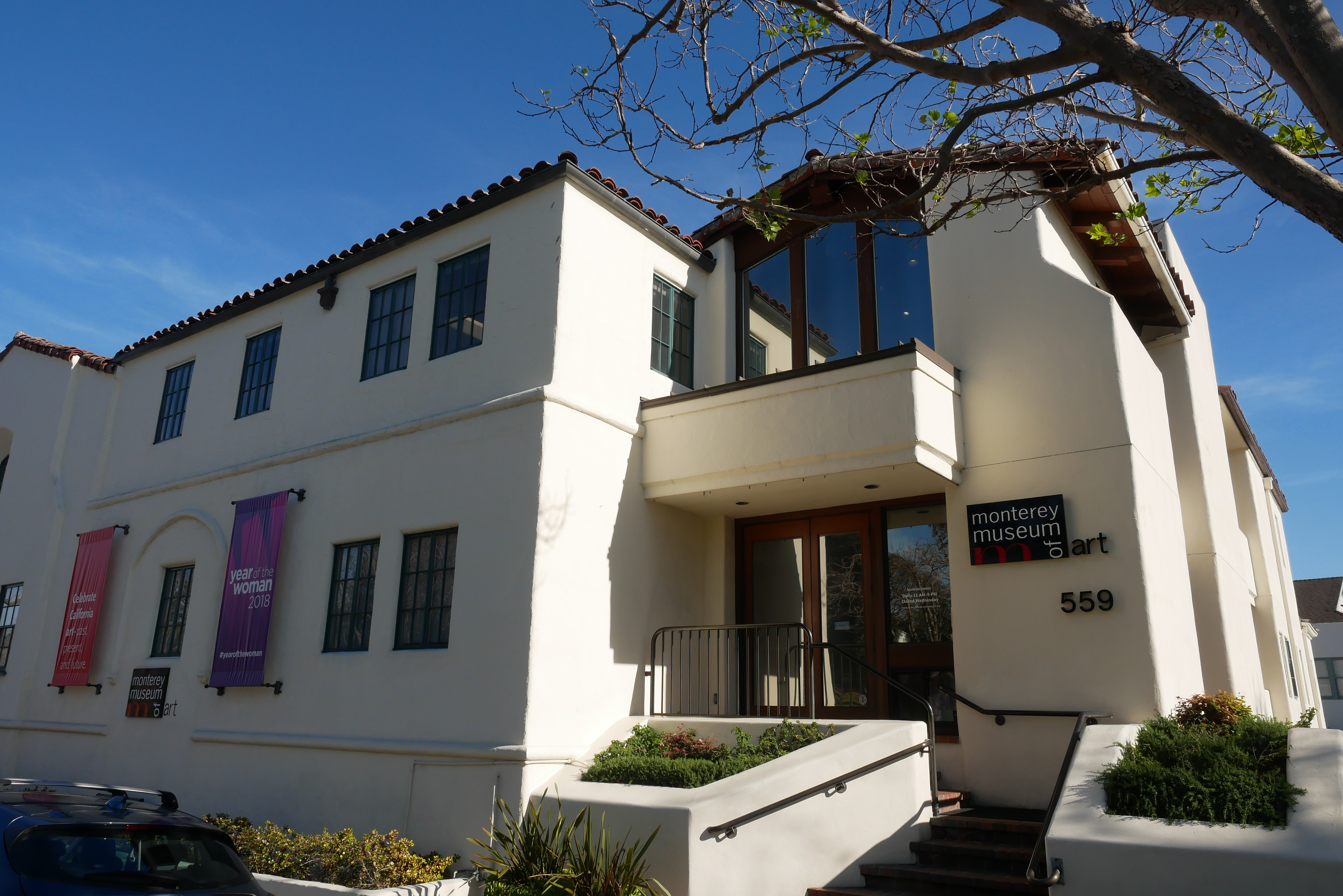
The Monterey Museum of Art is home to an important collection of works by Early California artists.

Monterey is the home of the Monterey Museum of Art, its annex museum La Mirada and the Salvador Dalí Museum. There are several commercial galleries in the historic district of Cannery Row, New Monterey and Custom House Plaza.

=== Music ===
The Monterey Jazz Festival began in 1958, presenting such artists as Louis Armstrong, Dizzy Gillespie, and Billie Holiday, and now claims to be "the longest running jazz festival in the world" (the Newport Jazz Festival was established in 1954, but has changed venues since its founding).

In June 1967 the city was the venue of the Monterey Pop Festival. Formally known as the Monterey International Pop Music Festival, the three-day concert event was held June 16 to 18, 1967, at the Monterey County Fairgrounds. It was the first widely promoted and heavily attended rock festival, attracting an estimated 200,000 total attendees with 55,000 to 90,000 people present at the event's peak at midnight on Sunday. It was notable as hosting the first major American appearances by Jimi Hendrix and The Who, as well as the first major public performances of Janis Joplin and Otis Redding.

The Old Fisherman's Wharf is a popular tourist attraction.

The Monterey Pop Festival embodied the themes of San Francisco as a focal point for the counterculture and is generally regarded as one of the beginnings of the "Summer of Love" in 1967. It also became the template for future music festivals, notably the Woodstock Festival two years later.

In 1986, the Monterey Blues Festival was created and ran continuously for over two decades. It filed for bankruptcy in 2012 and was resurrected in 2017 as the Monterey International Blues Festival.

=== Literature ===
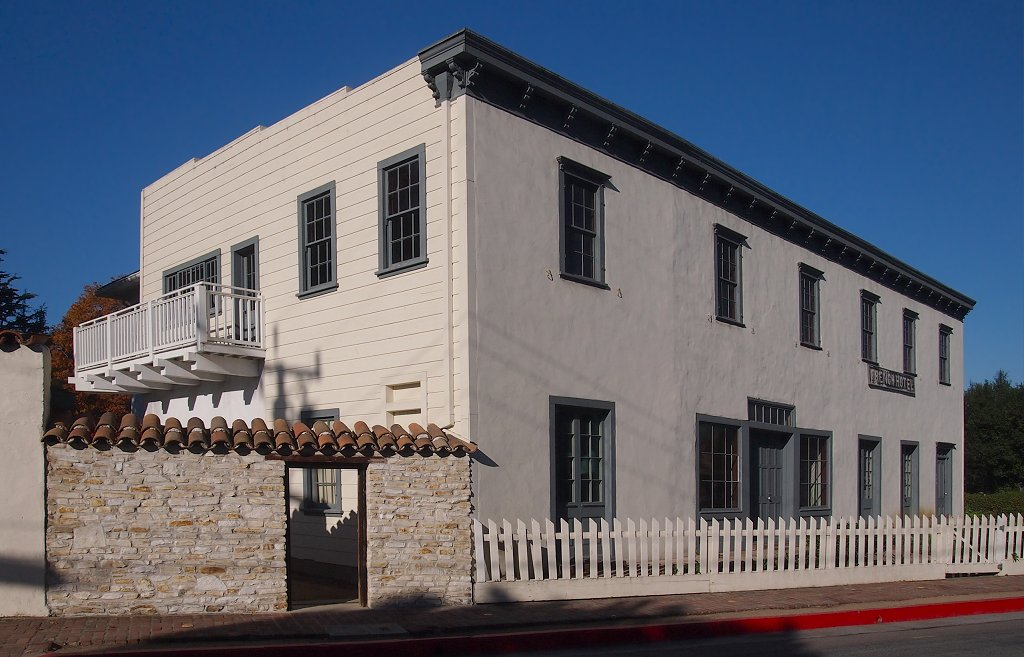
Stevenson House, built in 1836 by Rafael González, was home to Scottish author Robert Louis Stevenson in the 1870s.

Steinbeck's friends included some of the city's more colorful characters, among them Ed Ricketts, a marine biologist, and Bruce Ariss, artist and theater enthusiast who designed and built the Wharf Theater.

After Ricketts's death, the new owner of his lab and a group of friends assembled each Wednesday at the lab for drinks and jazz music. While visiting with the group, San Francisco disc jockey Jimmy Lyons suggested holding a jazz celebration in Monterey, which eventually became the Monterey Jazz Festival.

In 1879, Robert Louis Stevenson spent a short time in Monterey at the French Hotel while writing The Amateur Emigrant, "The Old Pacific Capital", and "Vendetta of the West". The former hotel, now known as the Stevenson House, stands at 530 Houston Street and features items that belonged to the writer.

=== Theater ===
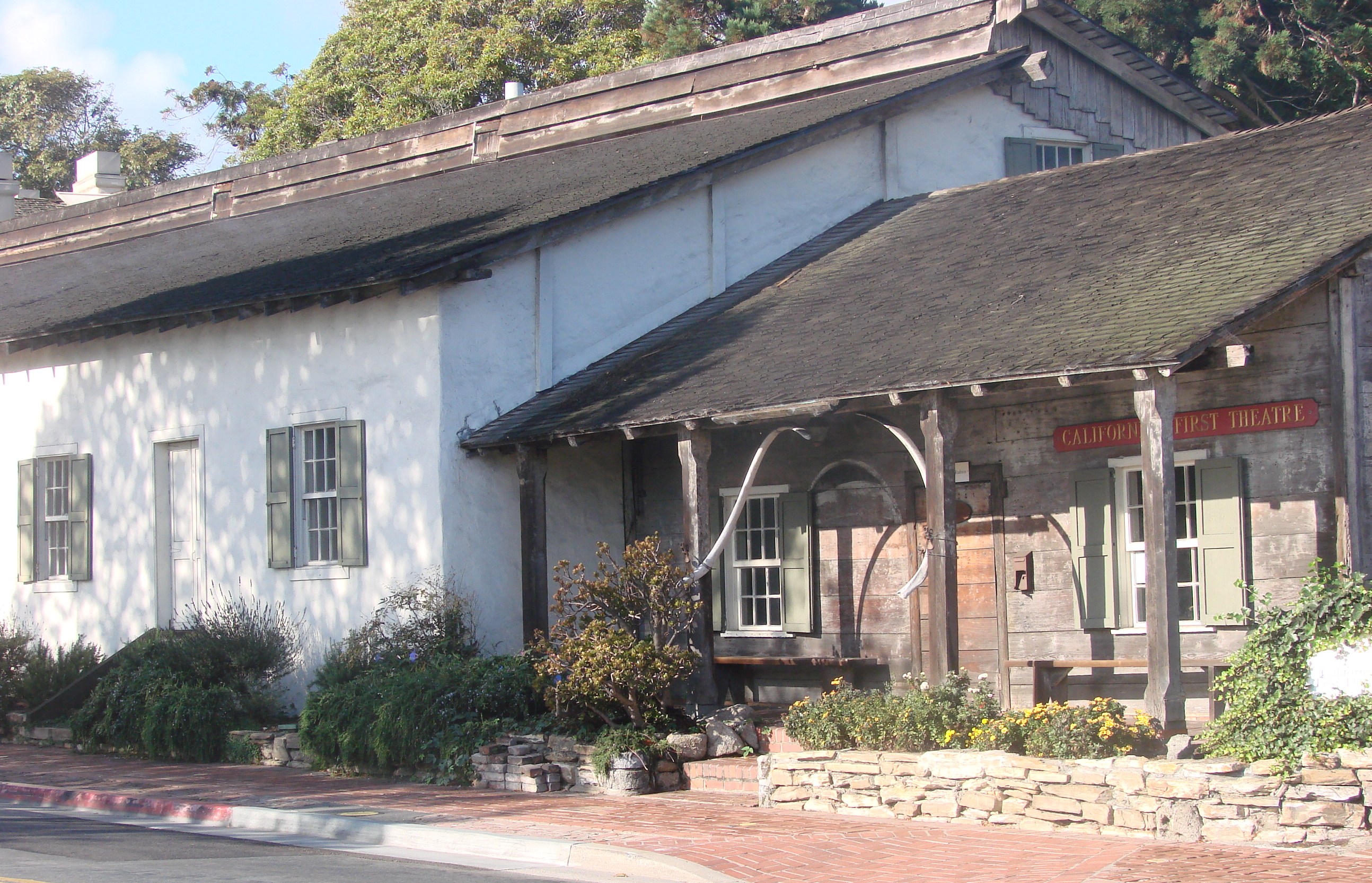
California's First Theater, built by Jack Swan in 1845–47.

The building in which the first paid public dramatic entertainment in California occurred is in Monterey and is called, appropriately, "California's First Theater". In 1847, a sailor, Jack Swan, began construction on an adobe building at the corner of Pacific Street and Scott Avenue, near the Pacific House and Fisherman's Wharf. Between 1847 and 1848 several detachments of soldiers were stationed in Monterey and some of the sailors approached Swan with a proposition to lease a section of his building for use as a theater and money-making venture—a proposal Swan accepted. The enterprise collected $500 on its first performance, a considerable sum at that time. The primary mediums presented were melodramas and Olios (a form of musical revue and audience sing-along). In the spring of 1848, the play Putnam, the Iron Son of '76, was presented. After the California Gold Rush of 1849, much of the population, including Swan, traveled to northern California in search of riches. As a result, by the end that year, the company disbanded. In 1896, Swan died and the building was abandoned until 1906 when it was purchased by the California Historic Landmarks League, who deeded it to the State of California. In 1937, the building was leased to Denny-Watrous Management, which revived the tradition of melodrama at the now historic building. A resident company was created, the Troupers of the Gold Coast, which maintained the tradition for over 50 years, closing for renovation in 1999. It is now permanently closed.

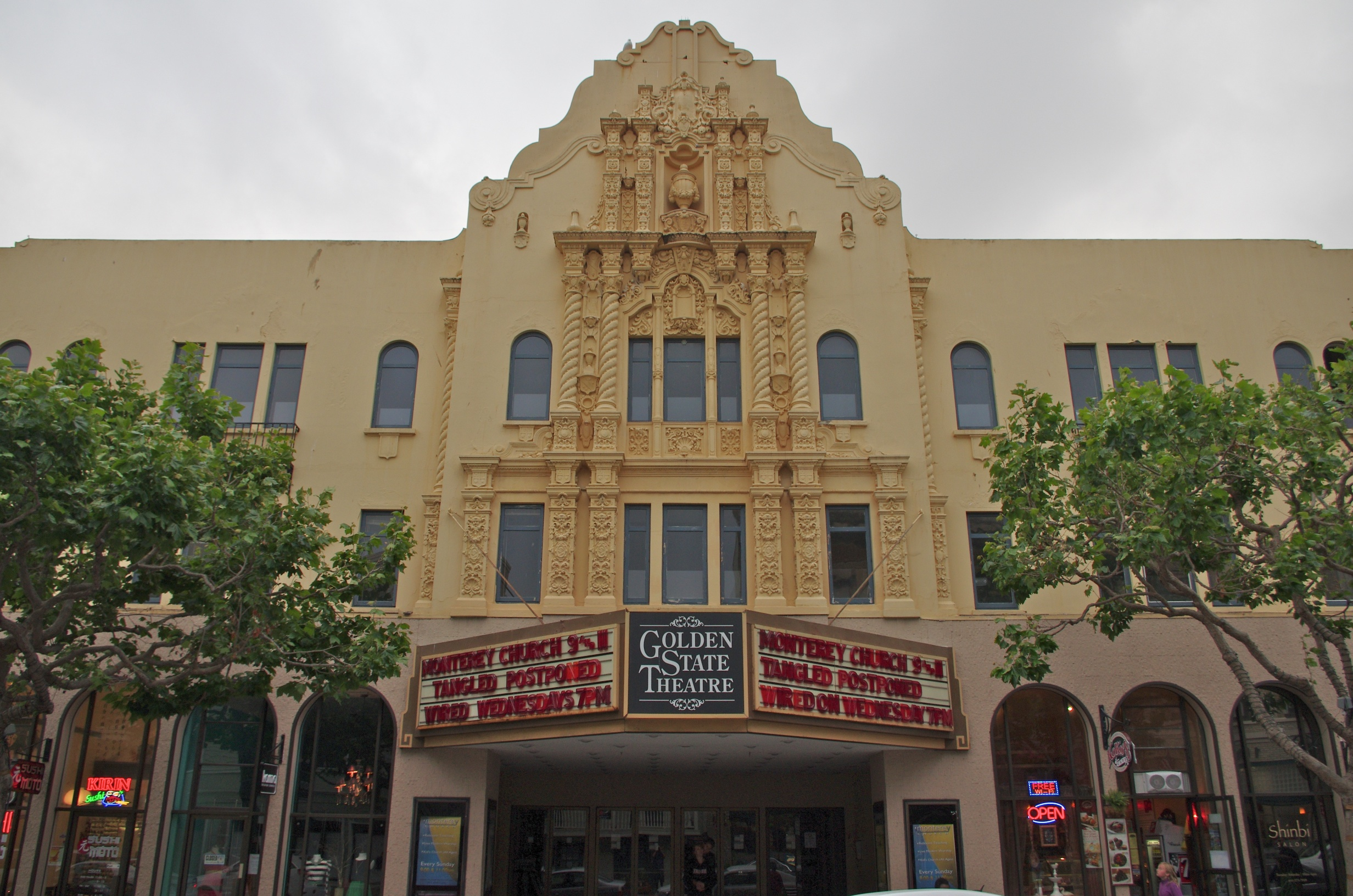
The Golden State Theatre, built in 1926 in a California Churrigueresque-style designed by Reid & Reid.

The Wharf Theater opened on Fisherman's Wharf on May 18, 1950, with a production of Happy Birthday, featuring a set designed by Bruce Ariss. The theater also produced one of Ariss's plays and was successful enough to draw the attention of MGM, which brought Ariss to Hollywood to work for several years. The theater was destroyed by fire on December 31, 1959. The company reopened in 1960 in a new location on Alvarado Street (formerly "The Monterey Theater") which in 1963 was renamed "The Old Monterey Opera House". It continued until the mid-1960s when it fell to urban renewal. In the early 1970s, discussions began about rebuilding back on the wharf itself, and theater plans began to take shape. Ariss and Angelo Di Girolamo began construction on The New Wharf Theater in 1975. The New Wharf Theater opened its doors on December 3, 1976, with a community theater production of Guys and Dolls, directed by Monterey Peninsula College Drama Department chairman, Morgan Stock. At the northwest end of old Fisherman's Wharf, the theater is now known as the Bruce Ariss Wharf Theater.

In 2005, the Golden State Theatre, a former movie palace on Alvarado Street, was refurbished to produce live theatrical events. The Forest Theater Guild produced several plays at the Golden State, including Aida, Grease, Zoot Suit, and Fiddler on the Roof. The theater's new owners, Eric and Lori Lochtefeld, have produced several musicals in the theater in conjunction with Broadway By the Bay.

== Sports ==
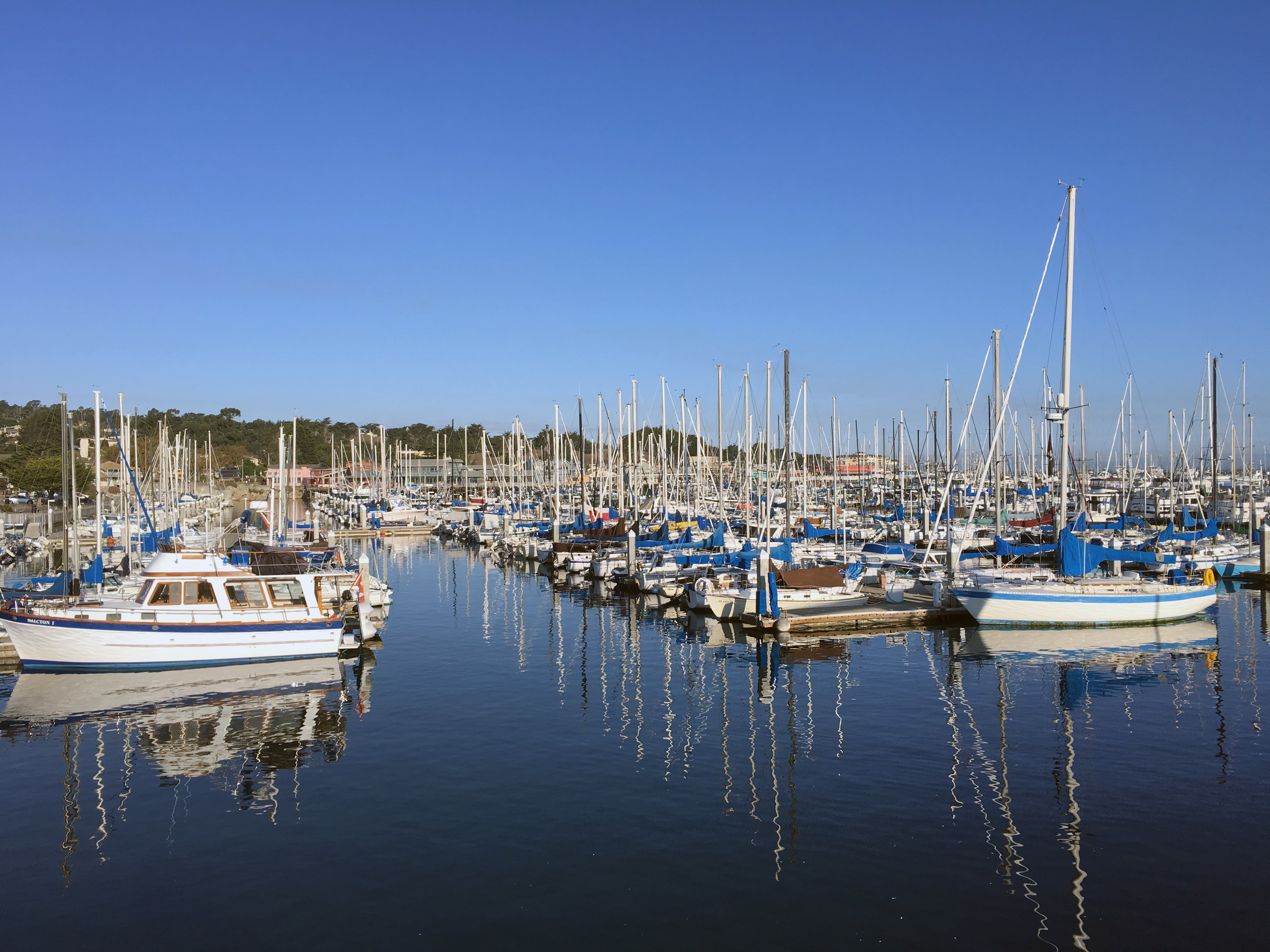
The marina at Monterey Harbor.

The Monterey Amberjacks are a professional baseball team that competes in the independent Pecos League which is not affiliated with Major League Baseball or Minor League Baseball. They play their home games at Sollecito Ballpark.

Monterey Bay FC plays in the USL Championship, the second tier of professional soccer in the US, and plays its home matches at Cardinale Stadium in Seaside, California.

The Monterey Peninsula Soccer League is an adult amateur soccer league featuring teams from Monterey and the surrounding region.

The PURE Insurance Championship is a gold championship held in Monterey and neighboring Pebble Beach.

== Government ==
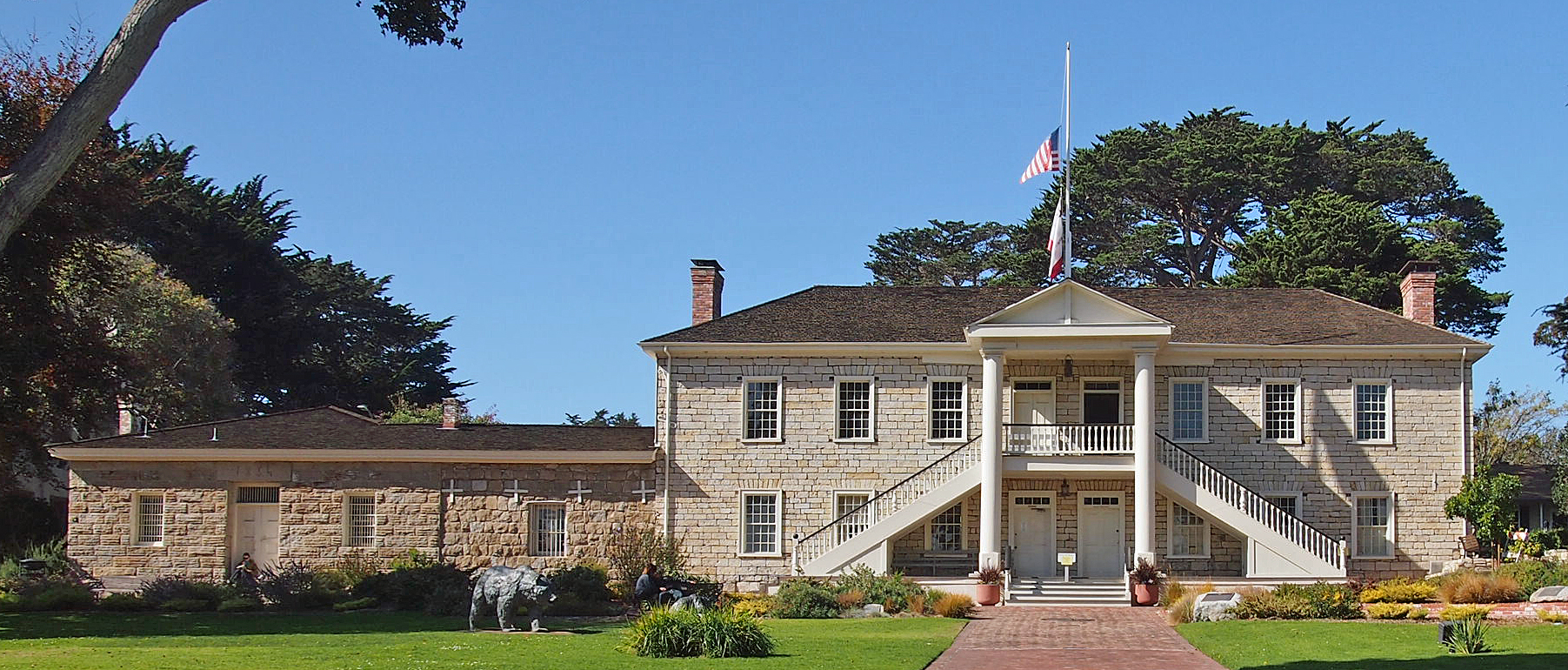
Colton Hall hosted California's Constitutional Convention of 1849.

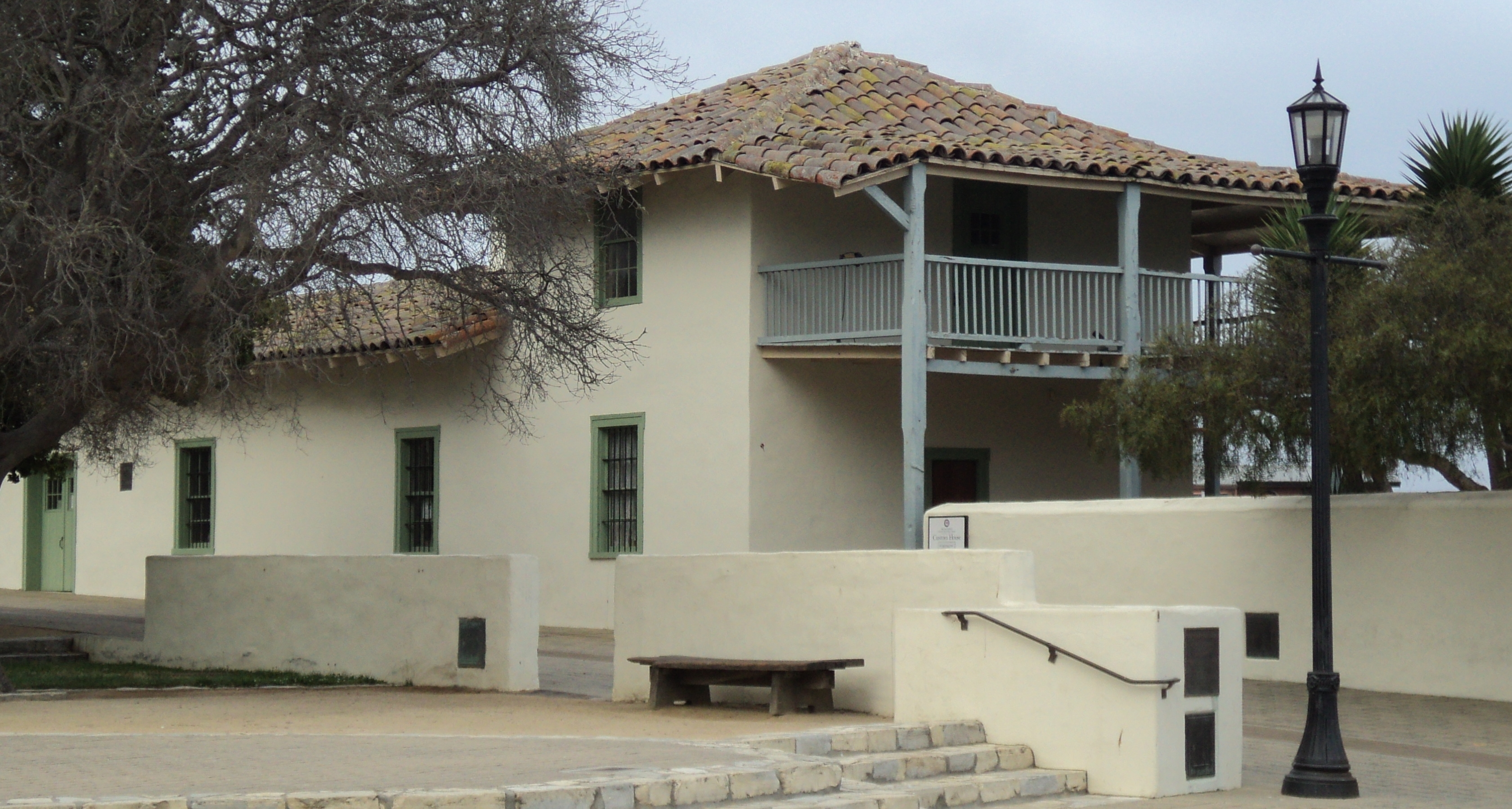
Built by Mexican authorities in 1827, Old Custom House is the oldest government building in California.

Monterey is governed by the Mayor of Monterey and four city council members. As of 2025, the mayor is Tyller Williamson and the city council members are Kim Barber, Gino Garcia, Jean Rasch, and Ed Smith.

The City of Monterey provides base maintenance support services for the Presidio of Monterey and the Naval Postgraduate School, including streets, parks, and building maintenance. Additional support services include traffic engineering, inspections, construction engineering and project management. This innovative partnership has become known as the "Monterey Model" and is now being adopted by communities across the country. This service reduces maintenance costs by millions of dollars and supports a continued military presence in Monterey.

The city government's Recreation and Community Services department runs the Monterey Sports Center.

=== County, state, and federal representatives ===
Monterey is represented on the Monterey County Board of Supervisors by Supervisor Mary Adams.

In the California State Legislature, Monterey is in the 17th senatorial district, represented by Democrat John Laird, and the 30th Assembly district, represented by Democrat Dawn Addis.

In the United States House of Representatives, Monterey is part of California's 19th congressional district, represented by Democrat Jimmy Panetta.

== Media ==
Local radio stations include KPIG-FM 107.5, KAZU-FM – 90.3 KDON-FM – 102.5, KCDU-FM – 101.7, KWAV-FM – 96.9, KDFG-FM – 103.9, KMBY – 1240 AM, KRML 94.7 FM jazz, and 1610-AM the city information station. Television service for the community comes from the Monterey-Salinas-Santa Cruz designated market area (DMA). Local newspapers include the Monterey County Herald and the Monterey County Weekly.

== Infrastructure ==
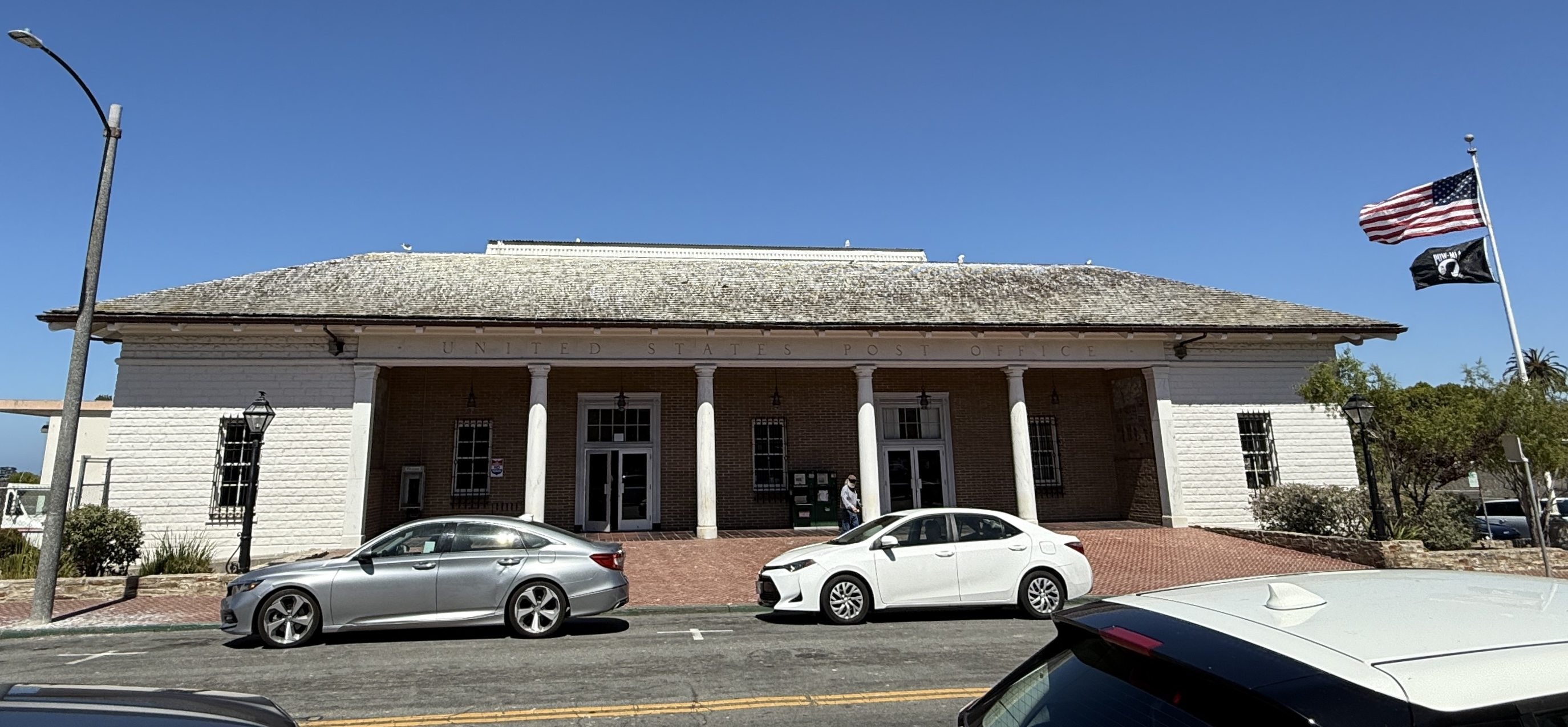
Monterey Post Office which opened in 1849.

The city is served by a United States Postal Service post office located on Hartnell Street. The post office opened in 1849 and is said to be the first post office west of the Rockies.

=== Transportation ===
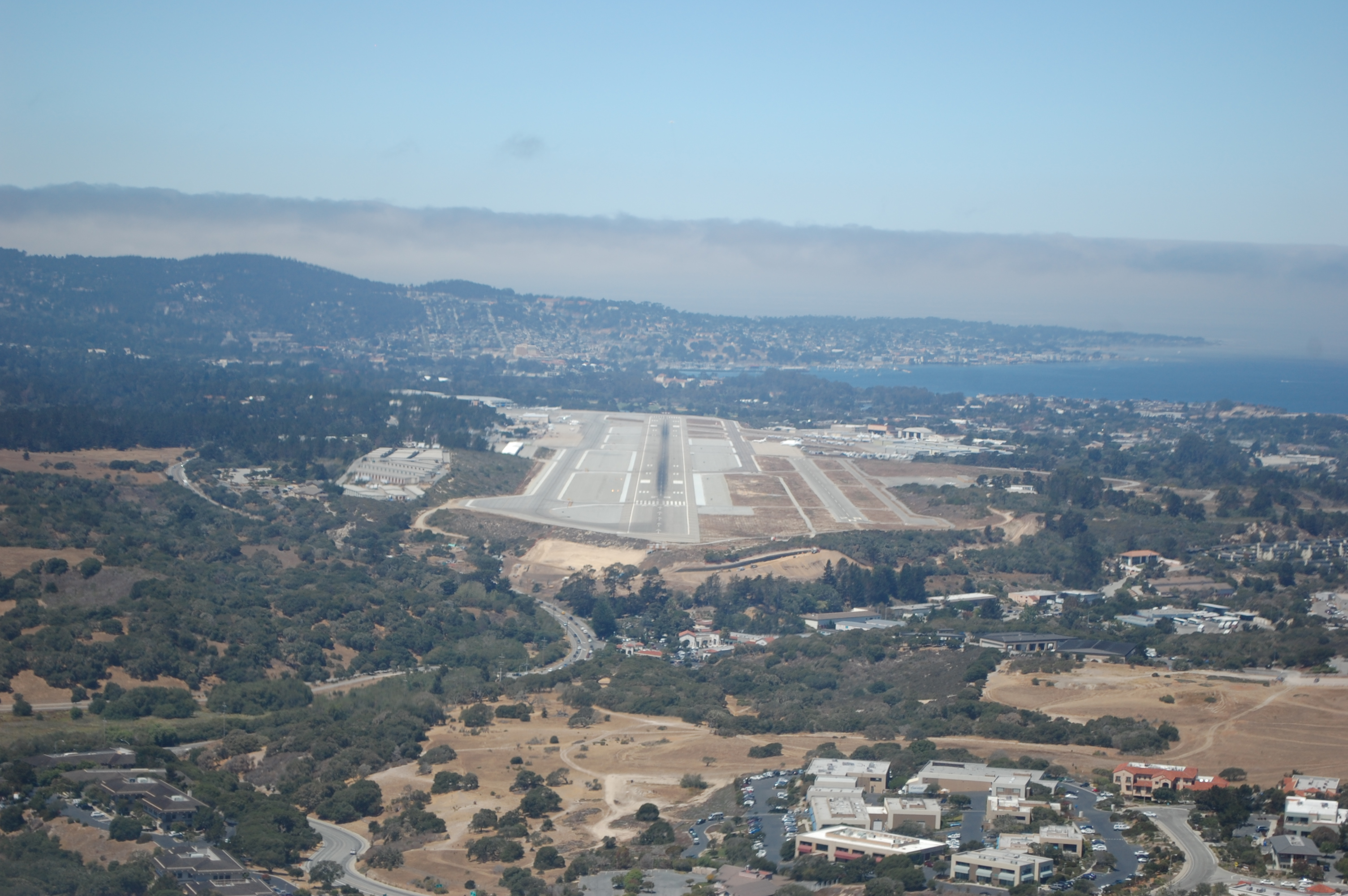
Monterey Regional Airport

The city is serviced by CA 1, also known as the Cabrillo Highway, as it runs along the coastline of the rest of Monterey Bay to the north and Big Sur to the south. CA 68, also known as the Monterey-Salinas Highway, connects the city to US 101 at Salinas and to Pacific Grove.

Local bus service is provided by Monterey-Salinas Transit.

Monterey Regional Airport connects the city to the large metropolitan areas in California, Arizona, Colorado, and Nevada.

Monterey train station was served until 1971, when Amtrak took over intercity train service and the Del Monte was discontinued.

== Education ==
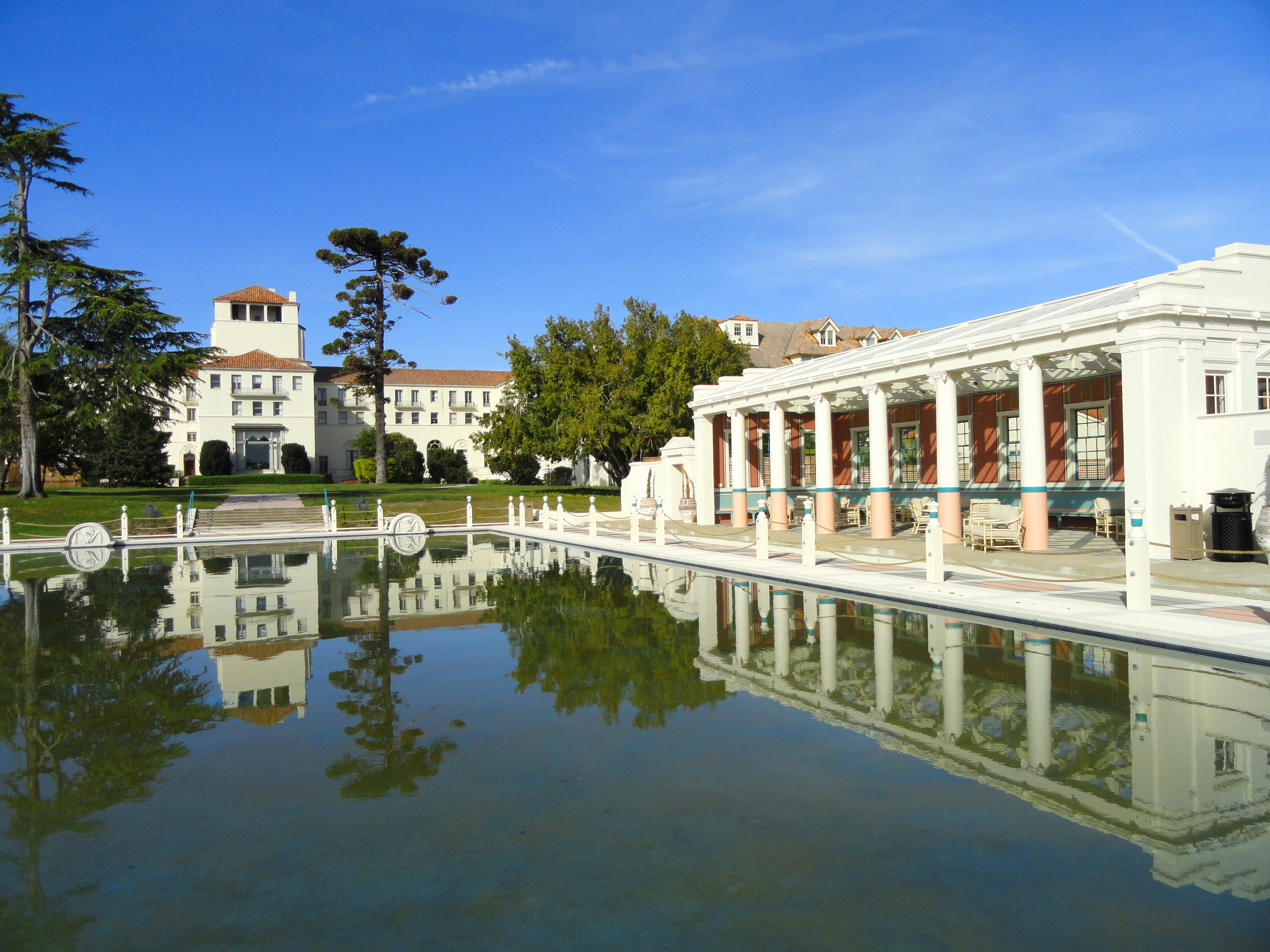
Naval Postgraduate School is the only West Coast location of the U.S. Naval University System.

Several institutions of higher education in the area: the Defense Language Institute, located on the Presidio of Monterey, California; the Naval Postgraduate School, on the site of a former resort hotel; the Middlebury Institute of International Studies at Monterey (a graduate school of Middlebury College); and Monterey Peninsula College, part of the California Community Colleges system. The federal institutions (the Defense Language Institute (DLI) and the Naval Postgraduate School (NPS)) are important employers in and strongly associated with the city.

California State University, Monterey Bay and the Monterey College of Law are located at the site of the former Fort Ord in neighboring Seaside. CSU Monterey Bay has developed several programs in marine and watershed sciences.

The Monterey Peninsula Unified School District operates a high school, a middle school and three elementary schools. Private schools include Santa Catalina School (girls, co-ed elementary and middle school) and Trinity Christian High School (co-ed).

== Notable people ==
- Mike Aldrete, major league baseball player (1986–96); coach, St. Louis Cardinals
- Gina Aliotti, IFBB professional figure champion
- John Whitby Allen, model railroader
- Bruce Ariss, artist
- Jean Arthur, actress
- Art Bell, resident in the 1970s
- Tory Belleci, MythBusters presenter
- Josh Billings (pen name of Henry Wheeler Shaw, 1818–1885), second most famous humorist (after Mark Twain) of the mid-to-late 19th century; died at Monterey
- Lisa Bruce, film producer
- Walter Colton (1797–1851), first Alcalde (mayor) of Monterey
- Juan B. R. Cooper, rancher, merchant, land owner, builder of the Cooper-Molera Adobe
- Joel Courtney, actor
- Claude Crabb pro football player 1962 – 1968
- Nick Cunningham, Team USA bobsledder; 2010–2014 Winter Olympian (2-Man & 4-Man)
- Peter J. Cutino, educator and head coach of University of California, Berkeley, water polo program
- Salvador Dalí, artist; had a studio in the 1940s on the present-day Santa Catalina School grounds
- Doris Day (1922–2019), actress, singer.
- Olin Dutra, 1934 U.S. Open golf champion
- Clint Eastwood, film actor, Oscar-winning director, and producer
- Darcie Edgemon, children's author
- Herman Edwards, NFL player for Philadelphia Eagles (1977–1986); head coach with New York Jets (2001–2005) and Kansas City Chiefs (2006–2009); TV commentator
- Abe Espinosa, professional golfer, winner of Western Open
- Chris Feigenbaum, Puerto Rican international soccer player
- Joan Fontaine, Oscar-winning actress, Rebecca, Suspicion
- John W. Frost, professional tennis player
- Percy Gray, artist, early California impressionist
- Harry Ashland Greene, businessman and philanthropist
- Milton B. Halsey, U.S. Army major general
- Richard Hamming, mathematician whose work influenced computer science and telecommunications
- Lou Henry Hoover (1874–1944), wife of U.S. President Herbert Hoover; First Lady of the United States, 1929–33
- Pete Incaviglia, major league baseball player (1986–98); manager, Grand Prairie AirHogs (minor league baseball)
- Ron Johnson, American football player
- Edward Kennedy, journalist
- Gary Kildall (1942–1994), founder of Digital Research, designer of the CP/M operating system, and teacher at the Naval Postgraduate School; lived in Pacific Grove and later Pebble Beach
- Major General Walter E. Lauer (1893–1966), served in World War I and II, commanded 99th Infantry Division in the Battle of the Bulge
- Henry Littlefield, author, historian, former headmaster of the York School
- Sondra Locke (1944–2018), Oscar-nominated actress, director
- James Lofton, football player for Green Bay Packers, Los Angeles Raiders, Buffalo Bills, Los Angeles Rams, and Philadelphia Eagles; member of Pro Football Hall of Fame
- Jack London (1876–1916), author
- Katerina Moutsatsou, Greek actress
- Michael Nesmith, member of the band The Monkees, songwriter
- Kim Novak, actress
- Leon Panetta, Congressman (1977–93); White House Chief of Staff (1994–97); Director of the Central Intelligence Agency (2009–2011); Secretary of Defense (2011–2013)
- Wayne Rainey, three-time 500 cc Grand Prix champion (1990, 1991, 1992)
- Ed Ricketts (1897–1948), marine biologist, pioneer ecologist, influence on John Steinbeck and Joseph Campbell
- Moqut Ruffins, American football player
- Allison Scagliotti, actress
- Charles R. Schwab, businessman
- Jean Bruce Scott, actress
- William Tecumseh Sherman (1820–1891), later U.S. Civil War Union general, lived in Monterey 1847–49.
- Vera Steadman, actress
- John Steinbeck (1902–1968), Nobel Prize-winning author of The Grapes of Wrath and Of Mice and Men
- Robert Louis Stevenson (1850–1894)), Scottish author of The Strange Case of Dr Jekyll and Mr Hyde and Treasure Island; stayed in Monterey, 1879
- Jeremy Sumpter, actor
- Edward Weston (1886–1958), photographer
- Douglas Yeo, bass trombonist, Boston Symphony Orchestra (1985–2012)
- Frank Zappa, composer and musician

== Sister cities ==
Monterey is twinned with:

- Dubrovnik, Croatia (2006)
- Isola delle Femmine, Italy (2017)
- Cervia, Italy (2014)
- Kuşadası, Turkey (2007)
- Lankaran, Azerbaijan (2011)
- Lleida, Spain (1980)
- Nanao, Japan (1995)
- Tainan, Taiwan (1984)

== See also ==
- Carmel, California
- Coastal California
- "Monterey", a famous song by Eric Burdon & The Animals
- Hula's Island Grill
- Montrio Bistro
- macOS Monterey
