= Mayor of Monterey =

Head of government in Monterey, California

- Ceremonial flag of the City of Monterey.

- Incumbent; Tyller Williamson since November 2022
- City of Monterey
- Style: The Honorable
- Type: Council–manager government
- Member of: City Council of Monterey
- Term length: 2 years
- Precursor: Alcalde of Monterey; Encargado de Justicia; Juez de Paz; President of the Board of Trustees
- First holder: Téodose Flores (1820); Philip A. Roach (1850); Walter Colton (1846); Delos R. Ashley (1853); Carmel Martin (1911)
- Website: Official website

The Mayor of Monterey is an elected member of the Monterey City Council and acts as the Chief Executive Officer of the City Government of Monterey, California. Since the year 1925, Monterey operates through a form of the Council-Manager Government, where the Mayor represents the city but only gets a single vote on the city council. The City Manager, a city government official appointed by the council, runs the daily affairs of the city's managerial tasks.

During the Spanish period and the Mexican period of Monterey, the person who ran this area was known as the Alcalde of Monterey. The duties of an Alcalde were markedly different than that of a modern Mayor; the Alcalde served as Monterey's mayor, magistrate, and commander of the local militia and police forces, in addition to managing sanitation, schools, and coordinating with Customs officials. The first Ayuntamiento was established in 1820, with Téodose Flores serving as the first Alcalde. Alcaldes were elected annually, without the right to reelection for two or three years, by the Ayuntamiento. In 1838, with the Mexican central government changing its structure, the Governor accepted the disbandment of the Ayuntamiento and the Alcalde, and the duties of Alcalde were absorbed by a Juez de Paz (English: Justice of the Peace). Alcaldes were reinstated in 1844. The Alcalde carried their authority from the Baston de Mando, a staff or stick which bore the symbol of the Alcalde, and without the Bastion, they held no power.

The first American Alcalde of Monterey was Walter Colton, at which point term limits were changed. The first Mayor of Monterey was Philip A. Roach, who had been serving as Alcalde when the Ayuntamiento was re-incorporated in 1850. From 1853, the town was unincorporated, the office was abolished and their duties were absorbed by the President of the Board of Trustees. For a decade following 1869, all civic institutions in the town were abolished. The town was re-incorporated in 1890 with another Board of Trustees. In 1911, the position of Mayor of Monterey was reestablished with the election of the "first" Mayor of Monterey, Carmel Martin, in 1911. At some point, the term limits were made every 2 years. In the 1925 Charter of Monterey, the language stated that the Mayor would assume office on the Monday after the election.

== Alcalde of Monterey, Nuevo California ==
Approximation of the insignia of the Alcalde of Monterey, found carved into the staff of the Alcalde (or baston de mando), which resides in the Colton Hall Museum in Monterey.

Last known baston de mando of the Alcalde of Monterey, currently in the Colton Hall Museum in Monterey.

Alcalde of Monterey, Nuevo California
#	Image	Name	Term start	Term end	Notes	Ref.
1		Téodose Flores	1820	1821	Ayuntamiento	
		Joaquín de la Torre	1821	1822		

== Alcalde of Monterey, Alta California (1822–1839) ==
First Mexican Empire
#	Image	Name	Term start	Term end	Notes	Ref.
		Marcelino Escobar	1822	1823		
		Mariano Soberanes	1823	1824		
First Mexican Republic
		?	1825	1826		
		Juan Alvires	1826	1827		
		José Tiburcio Castro	1827	1828		
		José Tiburcio Castro	1828	1829		
		Mariano Soberanes	1829	1830		
		Marcelino Escobar	1830	1831		
		Antonio Buelna	1831	1832		
		Salvador Espinosa	1832	1833		
		Marcelino Escobar	1833	1834		
Centralist Republic of Mexico
		Manuel Jimeno Casarin	1834	1835		
		David Spence	1835	1836		
		José Rafael Gonzalez	1835	1836		
		José Ramon Estrada	1836	1837		
		Marcelino Escobar	1836	1837		
–		Teodoro Gonzalez	1836	1836	Acting	
		Teodoro Gonzalez	1837	1838		
		Estévan Munrás	1837	1838		
		Marcelino Escobar	1837	1838		
		Jose Antonio Yorba II	1838	1838		

== Encargado de Justicia (1839–1839) ==
#	Image	Name	Term start	Term end	Notes	Ref.
		José Simeon Nepomuncena de Castro (Simeon Castro)	1838	April 1839		
		Feliciano Soberanes	1838	April 1839		

== Juez de Paz of Monterey (1839–1842) ==
#	Image	Name	Term start	Term end	Notes	Ref.
		David Spence	May 1839	1840	Serving in this capacity during the creation of the Monterey Catholic Cemetery.	
		Estévan Munrás	May 1839	1840		
		José Ábrego	1841	October 20, 1842		

== American Alcalde of Monterey (1842) ==
#	Image	Name	Term start	Term end	Notes	Ref.
		Josiah Belden	October 20, 1842	October 21, 1842	Served for only 24 hours during the Accidental Capture of Monterey.	

== Juez de Paz of Monterey (1842–1844) ==
#	Image	Name	Term start	Term end	Notes	Ref.
		José Ábrego	October 21, 1842	?		
		George Allen	1842	1843		
		Theodoro González	1842	December 31, 1843	Elections were forced by the Governor to occur in November 1843, and the office of Alcalde was made to be re-instated in January 1844.	

== Alcalde of Monterey (1844–1846) ==
#	Image	Name	Term start	Term end	Notes	Ref.
		Jose Amesti	January 1, 1844	1845	Personal friend of Thomas Larkin and acquaintance of John C. Frémont.	
		?	?	?		
1845, Santa Anna falls from power, Governor Micheltorena ousted. New Governor re-instates the Prefecture system. Monterey retains Alcalde.
		?	?	?		
		Manuel Diaz	January 1, 1846	July 6, 1846	Serving as Alcalde when Commodore Stockton and Governor Sloat, outright refused to serve under the American administration.	
		Joaquin Escamilla	January 1, 1846	July 6, 1846	Second Alcade (similar to Vice Mayor) serving with Manuel Diaz. Also refused to serve under Sloat.	

== American Alcaldes of Monterey, Interim government of California (1846–1850) ==
#	Image	Name	Term start	Term end	Notes	Ref.
–		Rodman Price	July 7, 1846	July 30, 1846	Appointed as co-Alcalde with Edward Gilchrist.	
–		Edward Gilchrist	July 7, 1846	July 30, 1846	Appointed as co-Alcalde with Rodman Price.	
–		Walter Colton	July 30, 1846	September 15, 1846	Appointed on July 28 by Stockton aboard the USS Congress before stepping foot on land at Custom House.	
1		Walter Colton	September 15, 1846	1848 / 1849	Duly elected after military service expired. First elected Alcalde. Served during the breakout of the California gold rush. Completed the construction of Colton Hall at the end of his service.	
2		Don Florencio Serrano	1848 / 1849	1849	Served as Second Alcalde (Vice Mayor) of Monterey during the Mexican-American War. One of the first men who met the Americans when they landed.	
3		Philip A. Roach	1849	Self, as Mayor	Last Alcalde of Monterey.	

== Mayor of Monterey (1850-1853) ==
Mayor of Monterey (1850–1853)
#	Image	Name	Term start	Term end	Notes	Ref.
1		Philip A. Roach	January 2, 1850	1951	Ayuntamiento chartered in 1850. Town incorporated 1851. In 1951, Roach is elected to the office of Senator for the District of Monterey.	
2		Gilbert Murdock	January 13, 1851			
3		W. H. McDowell			Elected but never performed the duties of Mayor. Discrepancy in dates due to conflicts in sources.	
-		Charles Herron		May 11, 1853,	Performed the duties of McDowell's position. Discrepancy in dates due to conflicts in sources.	
3		J. B. Knapp	January 12, 1852		Discrepancy in dates due to conflicts in sources.	
4		Jno. M. O’Neal	January 13, 1853			

== President of the Board of Trustees ==
=== Unincorporated Monterey (1853–1869) ===
#	Image	Name	Term start	Term end	Notes	Ref.
1		Delos R. Ashley	May 11, 1853	?	Notoriously controversial lawyer, especially noted for his disreputable clientele. Personal attorney for the Monterey gangster David Jacks, namesake of Monterey Jack.	
		Josiah Merritt	January 4, 1854	?	From 1850 to 1854, the first to hold the title of Judge of Monterey County.	
		Delos R. Ashley	July 25, 1854	?		
		John Burke Phillips	January 24, 1859	?		
		Manual Diaz	June 5, 1865	?		
		J. B. Smith	December 28, 1867	?		
		John Myers	June 1, 1868			
		Francis "Frank" Doud	June 7, 1869			
		Samuel B. Gordon	?	?		

=== Civic abolishment (1869–1876) ===
Following a failed attempt to reincorporate Monterey as a city, the decade following 1869 saw no form of government institutions whatsoever.

In May 1869, the Golden spike was hammered in Utah, connecting California to the East by train for the first time.

=== Town of Monterey (1876–1890) ===
#	Image	Name	Term start	Term end	Notes	Ref.
		Samuel B. Gordon	1877	1883	In 1878, Gordon is selected as delegate to the 1878 California Constitutional Convention. The Monterey Fire Department is created in 1882. 1883 County and Township Government Act is passed, redefining governmental structures.	
		?	?	?	Construction begins on the Monterey–Salinas Railroad. Also begins on Monterey–Fresno Railroad.	
		I. A. Skinner	June 15, 1887	?		
		Louis Schaufele	June 12, 1888	?		
		James B. Snively	?	15 April 1890		

=== City of Monterey (1890–1911) ===
#	Image	Name	Term start	Term end	Notes	Ref.
		James B. Snively	15 April 1890	?	City re-incorporated in 1890, but Board of Trustees system remained in place.	
		David Rodrick	?	?	Prominent mine owner. Died of heart failure August 3, 1909 while still serving as a member of the board.	
		T. J. Fitzgerald	1895 (?)			
		Edward Ingram	1896 (?)			
		W. W. James	1896 (?)			
		Robert F. Johnson	January 1897	1905 or 1906	In 1904, his brother-in-law claimed that Johnson and his wife had abducted Johnson's nephew. The boy was discovered later having had joined the Army without his father's permission.	
		William "Will" Jacks	1905 or 1906	1910 or 1911	Son of David Jacks, serving as President / Mayor when his father died. Involved in the distribution of aid to the victims of the 1906 San Francisco earthquake.	

== Mayor of Monterey (1911–Present) ==
=== Mayor of Monterey (1911–1925) ===
#	Image	Name	Term start	Term end	Notes	Ref.
1		Carmel Martin	1911	May 6, 1913	First Mayor of Monterey elected after re-incorporation.	
?		Robert F. Johnson	May 6, 1913	1915		
?		Walter A. Lillie	April 21, 1915	April 1919	Committed suicide by shotgun in 1921 on exactly the same day as Jacob R. Miller, on the other side of town. His wife claimed that "...being quite deaf..." she didn't hear a sound.	
?		Philip J. Dougherty	April 1919	April 1923		
?		Benjamin Franklin Wright	April 1923	May 1925		

=== Mayor-Manager of Monterey (1925–Present) ===
#	Image	Name	Term start	Term end	Notes	City Manager	Ref.
		William George Hudson	May 1925	May 1927		Randall M. "Dell" Dorton	
		Joseph Kurtz Oliver	May 1927	May 1929	Father of Myron Oliver.		
		John P. Sandholdt	May 1929	May 1933			
		Fenn Steward	May 1933	February 9, 1934	Died suddenly of a heart attack while in office.		
		Walter Leon Teaby	February 9, 1934	1937	Formerly, the City Physician who contained the Smallpox Epidemic.	B. J. Pardee	
		Emmet G. McMenamin	1937	January 1, 1942	Left office to become Clerk.		
		John R. Perry	January 1, 1942	May 16, 1947	Also President of the Carmel Canning Company. Resigned early to focus on his business affairs. Mayor during the Centennial Celebrations of Monterey.	Christine Raynsford	
?		Hugh F. Dormody	May 16, 1947	May 10, 1949			
		Leater K. Smith	May 10, 1949	May 1951		Manuel Perry	
?		D. H. 'Dan' Searle	May 1951	May 1959	At 4 terms, longest service of any Mayor until Dan Albert.	Walter Hahn Jr.	
?		Shedo "Buck" S. Russo	May 1959	May 1961	Held a "day job" as the projectionist at the Golden State Theatre.	Walter Hahn Jr.	
		Lawrence "Sparky" M. Pollard	May 1961	May 1965	Also served as President of the Sports Car Racing Association of the Monterey Peninsula.	Walter Hahn Jr.	
?		Minnie Coyle	May 1965	May 1969	First female mayor of Monterey. Oversaw the initial construction of Lighthouse Tunnel.	Walter Hahn Jr.	
?		Al J. Madden	May 1969	May 1973		Al Coons	
		Peter Coniglio	May 1973	May 1977		Al Coons	
		Gerald T. “Jerry” Fry	May 1977	May 1983	Served during the creation of Monterey Bay Aquarium and the Monterey Conference Center.	John Dunn	
?		Clyde Roberson	May 1983	November 1987		John Dunn	
?		Dan Albert	November 1987	November 2006	Served during the End of the Cold War, the closure of Fort Ord, and the creation of the World Wide Web.	Fred Meurer	
?		Chuck Della Sala	December 2006	November 2014		Fred Meurer	
?		Chuck Della Sala	December 2006	November 2014		Mike McCarthy	
?		Clyde Roberson	November 2014	December, 2022	Served during the COVID-19 pandemic.	Mike McCarthy	
?		Clyde Roberson	November 2014	December, 2022	Served during the COVID-19 pandemic.	Hans Ulsar	
?		Tyller Williamson	November 2022	–	First black Mayor and first gay Mayor of Monterey.	Hans Ulsar	
?		Tyller Williamson	November 2022	–	First black Mayor and first gay Mayor of Monterey.	Dante Hall	
