= Vásquez House =

California Historical Landmark in Monterey County

- Vásquez Adobe
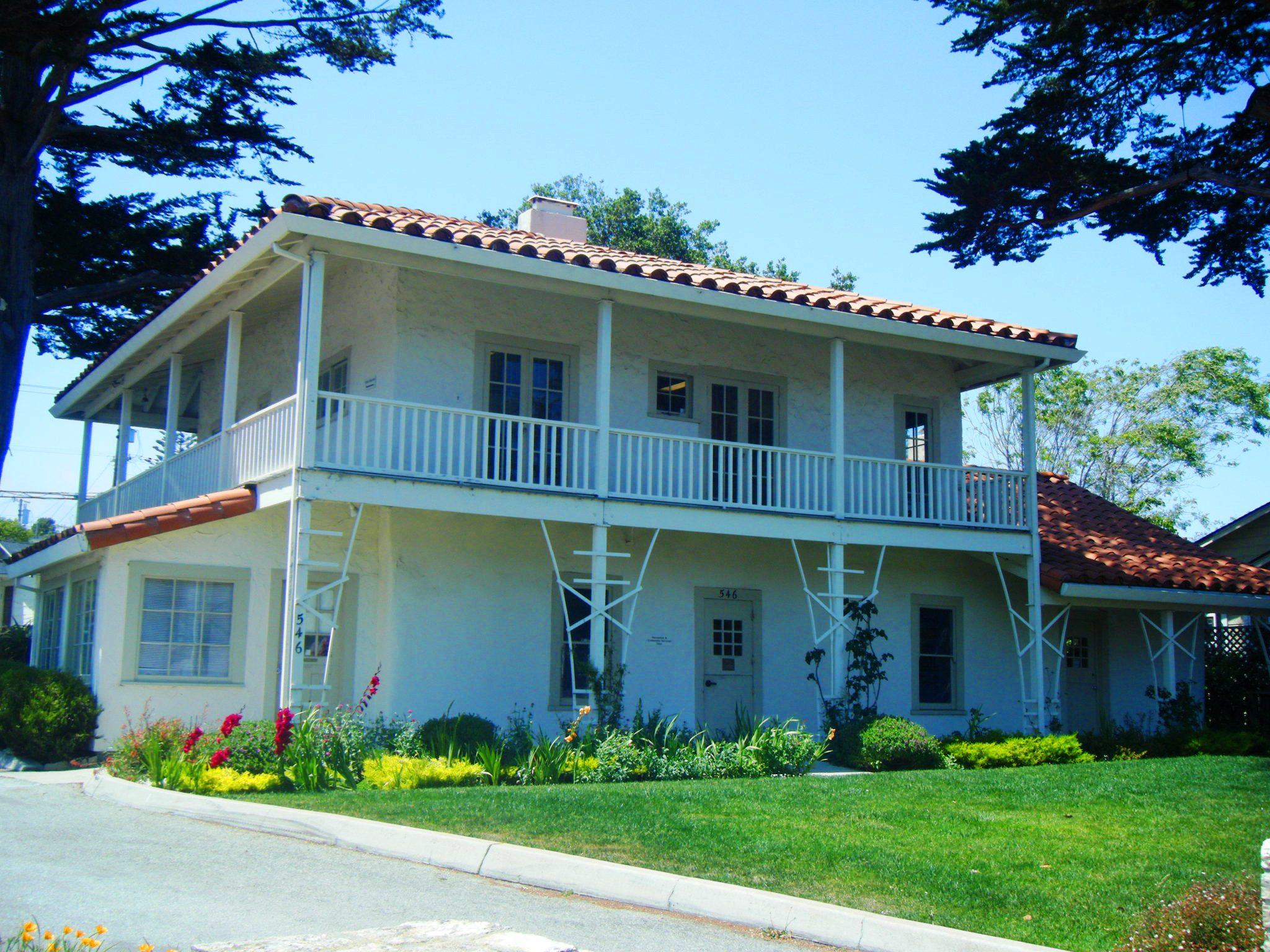
- Vásquez House, Monterey, California

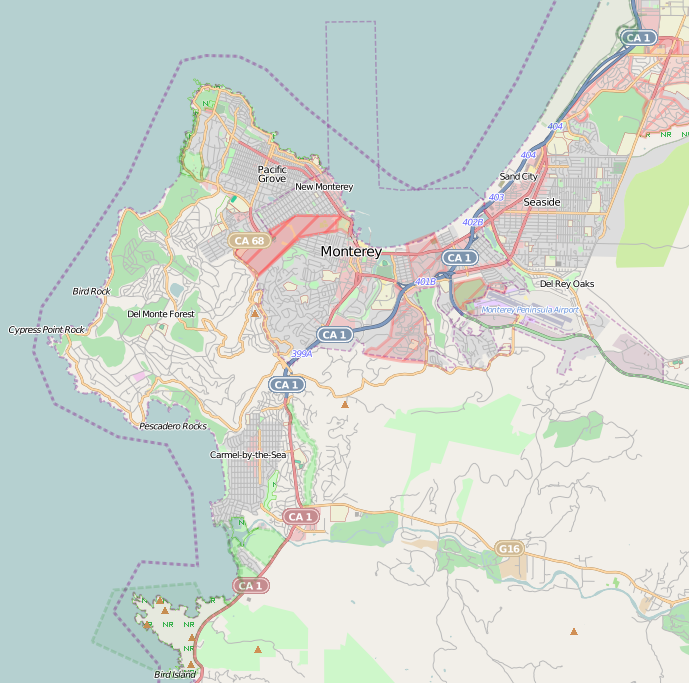
- Location in the Monterey Peninsula
- 36°35′52″N 121°53′53″W
- Location: 546 Dutra Street, Monterey, California

History
- Built: circa 1834

Site notes
- Architectural style: Adobe

California Historical Landmark
- Designated: October 8, 1939
- Reference no.: 351

The Vásquez House, also known as Vásquez Adobe, is a historic two-story adobe building located at 546 Dutra Street in Monterey, California. It was occupied by Dolores a sister of Tiburcio Vásquez (1835–1875), who was a Californio bandido that was active in California from 1854 to 1874. The building is listed as a California Historical Landmark #351. It is owned by the City of Monterey, which uses it as the administrative office of its Park and Recreation Department.

== History ==
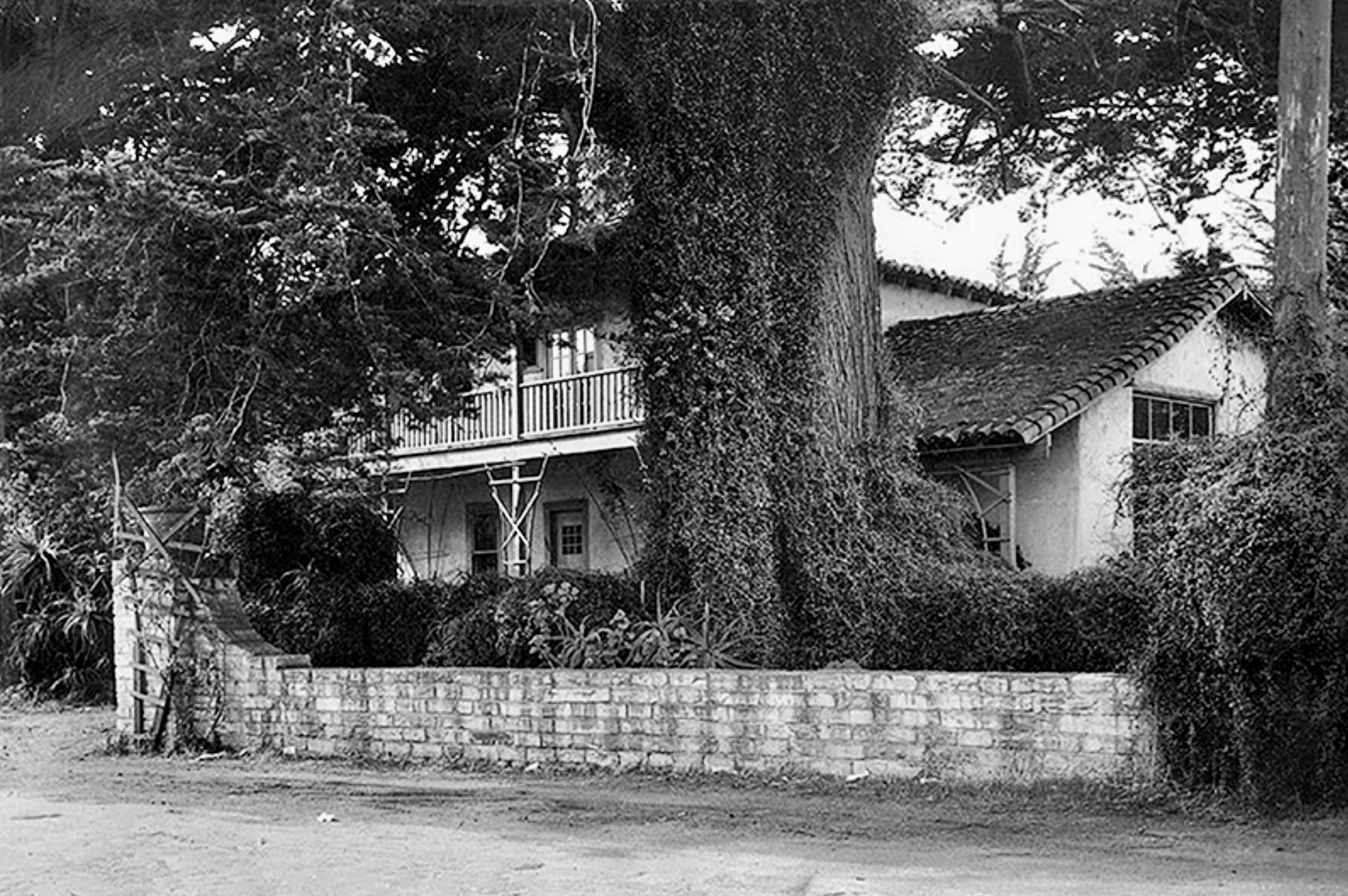
Vásquez House ca. 1922

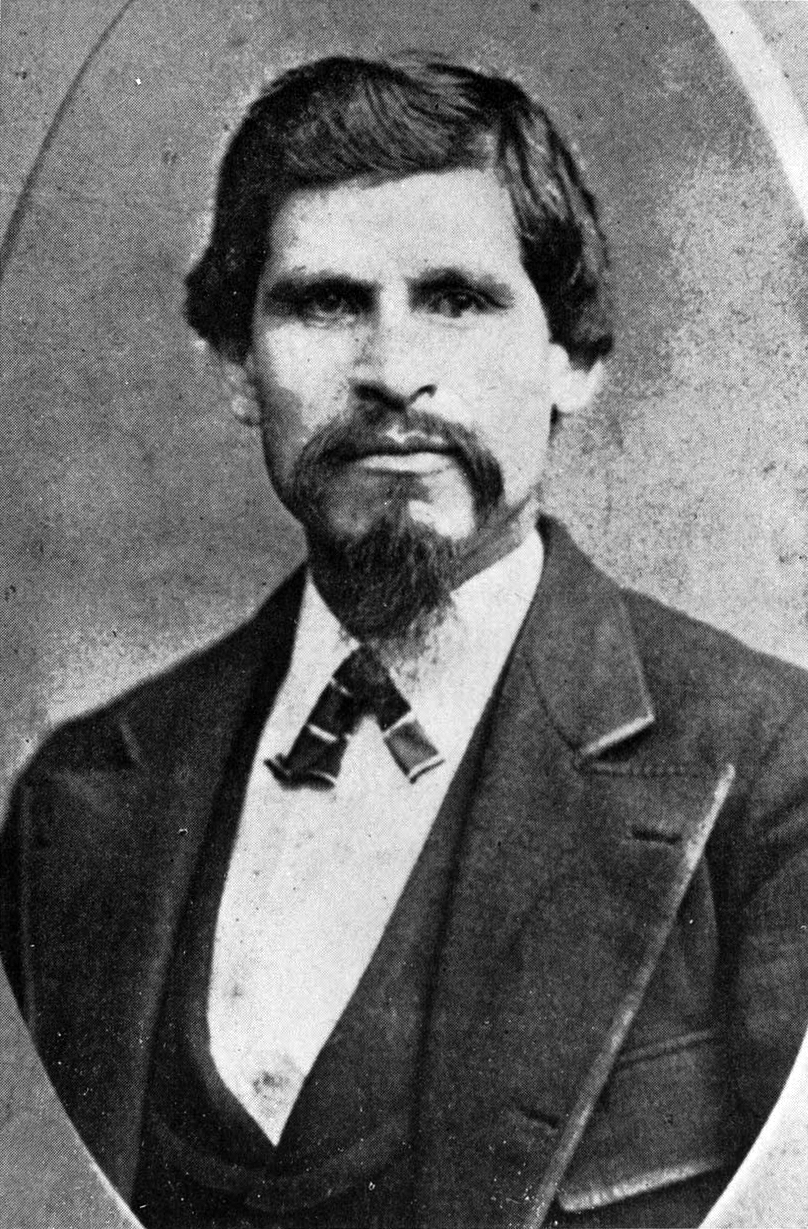
Tiburcio Vasquez (1835–1875)

Vásquez House, also known as Vasquez Adobe, and Casa Vasquez, was originally a one-story adobe when Tiburcio Vásquez's mother, María Guadalupe Cantúa, bought it in 1834 from the chief of police, Luis Placencia, who was also the town blacksmith. Tiburcio Vásquez was a Californio bandido that was active in California from 1854 to 1874. Tiburcio Vásquez was born in the home on April 10, 1835, and spent his childhood there.

The adobe house was 150 ft (46 m) by 150 ft (46 m) lot, having a narrow single story 40 ft (12 m) long and 15 ft (4.6 m) wide, with a peaked tile roof and two rooms with a living room and bedroom and kitchen. The front had a covered patio with two doors that opened directly into the rooms. Each room had a back door that opened into the yard behind it. The mud-brick adobe walls, 2 ft 6 in (0.76 m) thick, provided insulation that kept the house warm in winter and cool in summer.

According to the City of Monterey:

Old-timers recalled the young Vasquez as a bright and clever boy, a popular poet, musician, and dancer who could read, write, and speak fluently in English and Spanish. He grew up to be a dandy and a lady's man, and one of the most notorious bandits in California history... Legend suggests that the wily Tiburcio often returned to visit his sister in the old family home despite the house being located right behind Colton Hall — then the Monterey County Courthouse — with the County Jail right next door.

The Vásquez House on Dutra Street is located directly across the street from Colton Hall at 570 Pacific Street and near the old county jail. Colton Hall is a government building and museum. It was the site of California's first constitutional convention in 1849.

The Vásquez house has been modified over the years, but is still located in its original location at 546 Dutra Street, Monterey, California. The adobe was remodeled in 1925 with a second story addition made of wood and a ground floor addition.

== Historic preservation ==
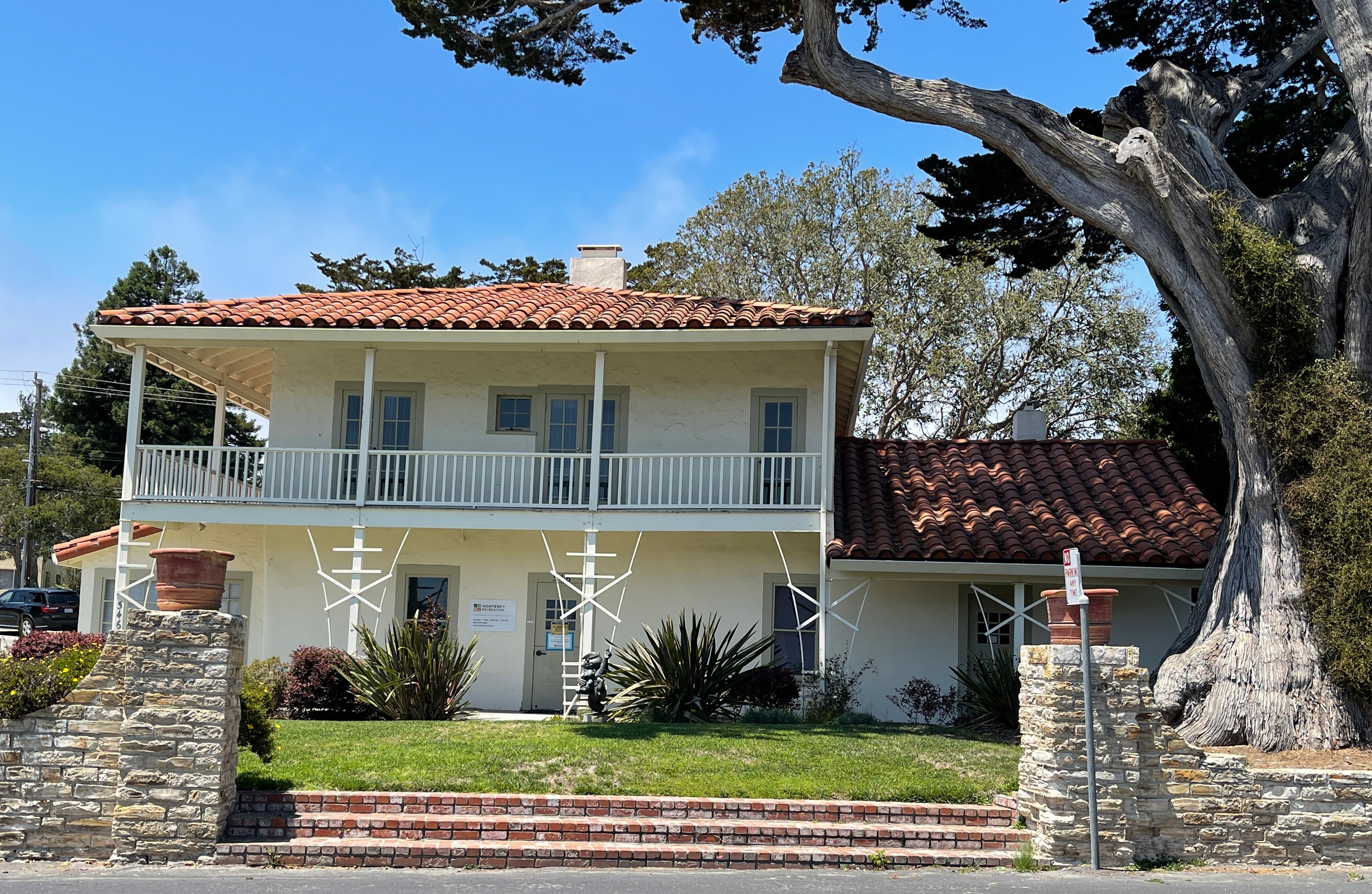
Vásquez House front view in 2022

The Vásquez House is a landmark that the city of Monterey was determined should not disappear. The historic house became the 351 California Historical Landmark on October 8, 1939.

On June 22, 1949, Monterey passed an ordinance to authorize the purchase of the Vásquez House. The city purchased the building for $20,000 (equivalent to $270,629 in 2025). The city remodeled the building after purchasing it in 1949. The city's Recreation & Community Services Department has operated from the building since 1951.

The building was retrofitted in 1997 for earthquake preparedness with some historic areas of the building restored. In 2012, the city provided ADA compliant parking for the City Hall and the Vásquez House on Dutra Street for $62,000 (equivalent to $86,947 in 2025).

== See also ==
- California Historical Landmarks in Monterey County
- Monterey State Historic Park
- List of the oldest buildings in California

== For Further Reading ==
Bandido: The Life and Times of Tiburcio Vasquez by John Boessenecker
