= Tiburcio Vásquez =

Californian bandit

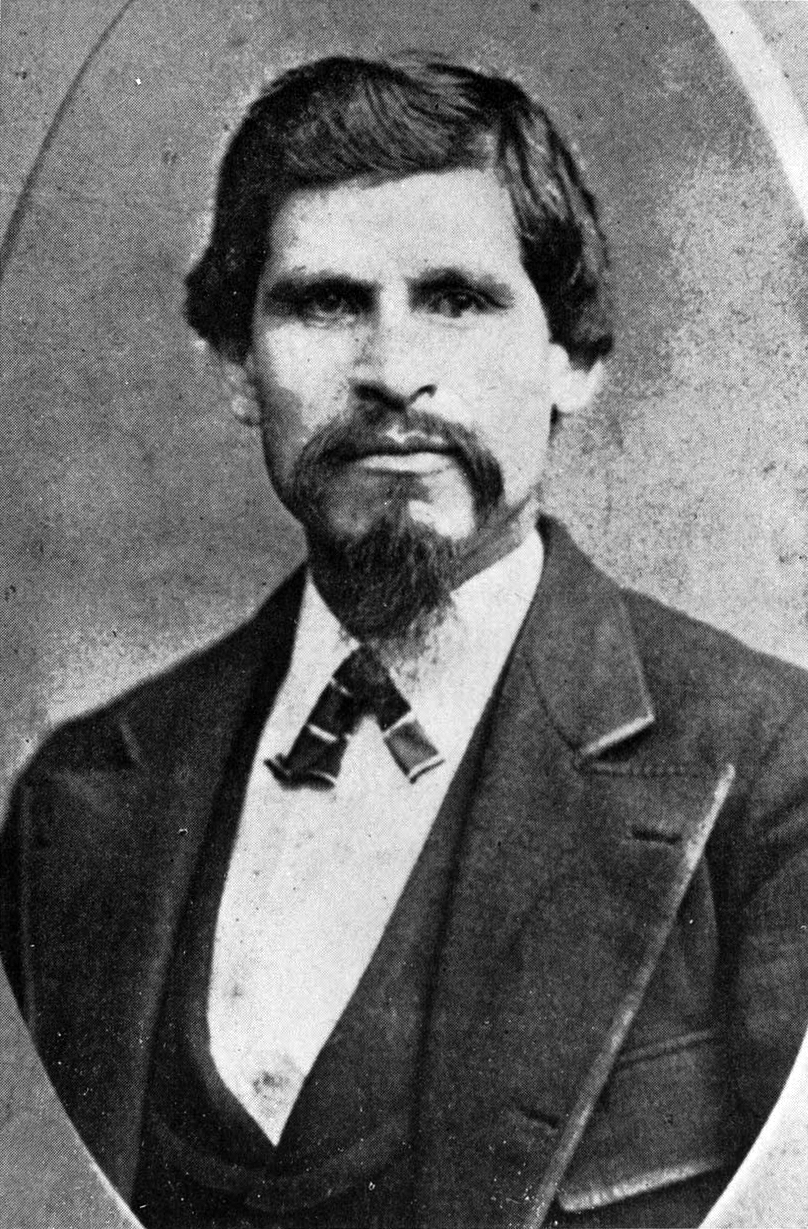
- Born: April 11, 1835; Monterey, Alta California, First Mexican Republic (today California, U.S.)
- Died: March 19, 1875 (aged 39); San Jose, California, U.S.
- Status: Executed
- Conviction: Murder
- Penalty: Death by hanging

Tiburcio Vásquez (April 11, 1835 – March 19, 1875) was a Californio bandido who was active in California from 1854 to 1874. The Vasquez Rocks, 40 miles (64 km) north of Los Angeles, were one of his many hideouts and are named after him.

== Early life ==
Tiburcio Vásquez was born in Monterey, Alta California, Mexico (present-day California, United States) on April 11, 1835, to José Hermenegildo Vásquez and María Guadalupe Cantúa. In accordance with Spanish tradition, Vásquez's birth was celebrated on the saint's feast day of his namesake, St. Tiburtius; thus, he always referred to his birthday as August 11, 1835. His great-grandfather came to Alta California with the De Anza Expedition of 1776. He grew up in a moderately well-off, middle-class family who owned land, granted to them by the Mexican government, due to his father's military service as a Spanish soldier. He spent plenty of time on his father's and his Uncle Felipe Vásquez's ranchos, learning the skills of ranching. He was noted as excellent in marksmanship and horsemanship from a young age. Vásquez was slightly built, and about 5 feet 7 inches (170 cm). He flourished in Monterey's early social scene, and he loved to attend the balls and dances that were popular in town. His family had sent him to a public school established by the government where he became proficient in both English and Spanish, an uncommon skill for the times.

By 1852, Vásquez had become a protégé of Anastacio García, one of California's most dangerous bandits. In 1854, Vásquez was present at the slaying of Monterey Constable William Hardmount, during a fight with García at a fandango. Vásquez denied any involvement in the murder, yet still fled, becoming an outlaw. With Alta California ceasing to exist (once becoming the U.S. state of California), and no longer under Mexican governance, thousands of settlers from states and territories further east arrived to claim land in California. This left many Mexicans feeling slighted and forgotten; Vásquez would later claim that his (eventual) crimes were retribution for discrimination by the settlers and white norteamericanos (‘North Americans’), insisting that he was a defender of Mexican-American rights. For the next 20 years, Vásquez and García played leading roles in Monterey County's murderous Roach-Belcher feud, ending when García was executed by hanging in 1875.

== Northern California ==
In 1856, a sheriff's posse caught up with Vásquez while he was rustling horses near Newhall, and he spent the next five years behind bars in San Quentin prison. There, Vásquez helped organize, and participated in, four bloody prison breaks which left twenty convicts dead. By 1866, he had committed numerous burglaries, cattle thefts, and highway robberies in Sonoma County. He was captured after a store burglary in Petaluma and sent to prison again for three years. His "trademark" was "binding [his victims'] hands behind their back and leaving them face down in the dust."

In 1870, Vásquez organized a bandit gang, which included the notorious Juan Soto and, later, Procopio Bustamante. After numerous bandit raids, Vásquez was shot and badly wounded in a gunfight with Santa Cruz police officer Robert Liddell. Vásquez managed to escape, and his sisters nursed him back to health.

In 1873, he gained statewide, and then nationwide, notoriety. Vásquez and his gang stole $2,200 from Snyder's Store in Tres Pinos, now called Paicines, in San Benito County. Three were killed, but not by Vásquez. Posses began searching for Vásquez, and Governor Newton Booth placed a $1,000 reward on his head. Sheriff John H. Adams from San Jose pursued the band to Southern California; Vásquez escaped after a gunfight.

== Southern California ==
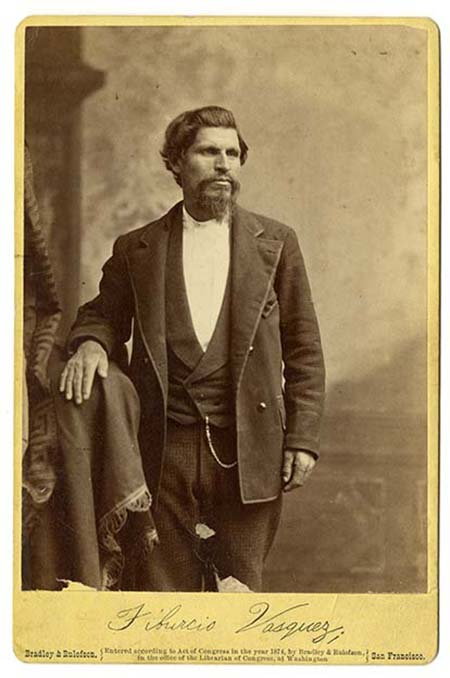
Vasquez c. 1874

Vásquez hid for a while in Southern California, where he was less well known. With his two most trusted men, he rode over the old Tejon Pass, through the Antelope Valley, and rested at Jim Hefner's ranch at Elizabeth Lake. Vásquez's brother, Francisco, lived nearby. After resting, Vásquez rode on to Littlerock Creek, which became his first Southern California hideout.

Vásquez was popular in the Mexican-American community, and had many friends and family members from Santa Rosa in Northern California to Los Angeles in the south. He was handsome, literate and charming, played guitar, and was a skillful dancer. Women were attracted to him, and he had many love affairs. He enjoyed reading romantic novels and writing poetry for his female admirers. He had several affairs with married women, one of which eventually led to his downfall.

Vásquez returned to the San Joaquin Valley. On November 10, 1873, he and his gang robbed the Jones store at Millerton in Fresno County. On December 26, 1873, he and his band sacked the town of Kingston in Fresno County, robbing all the businesses and making off with $2,500 in cash and jewelry.

Governor Booth was now authorized by the California State Legislature to spend up to $15,000 to bring the law down on Vásquez. Posses were formed in Santa Clara, Monterey, San Joaquin, Fresno, and Tulare counties. In January 1874, Booth offered $3,000 for Vásquez's capture alive, and $2,000 if he was brought back dead. These rewards were increased in February to $8,000 and $6,000, respectively. Alameda County Sheriff Harry Morse was assigned specifically to track down Vásquez.

Heading towards Bakersfield, Vásquez and gang member Clodoveo Chávez rode to the rock promontory near Inyokern now known as Robbers Roost. Near that spot, at Coyote Holes, they robbed a stagecoach from the Cerro Gordo Mines near Owens Lake of its silver. During the robbery Vásquez shot and wounded a man who did not obey his orders.

The gang moved to Elizabeth Lake and Soledad Canyon, robbing a stage coach of $300, stealing six horses and a wagon near present-day Acton, and robbing lone travelers. Vásquez was believed to be hiding out at what are now known as Vásquez Rocks. Shallow caves, deep crevices, and numerous overhangs created a maze for any posse to thread. The tallest rock, 150 feet (46 m) high, provided an excellent lookout point.

For the next two months, Vásquez escaped attention. However, he then made an error that led to his capture. On April 15, 1874, he and his band held the prominent sheepman Alessandro Repetto for ransom. Pursuing posses from Los Angeles almost trapped the gang in the San Gabriel Mountains, but once again, Vásquez and his men escaped.

== Arrest and execution ==
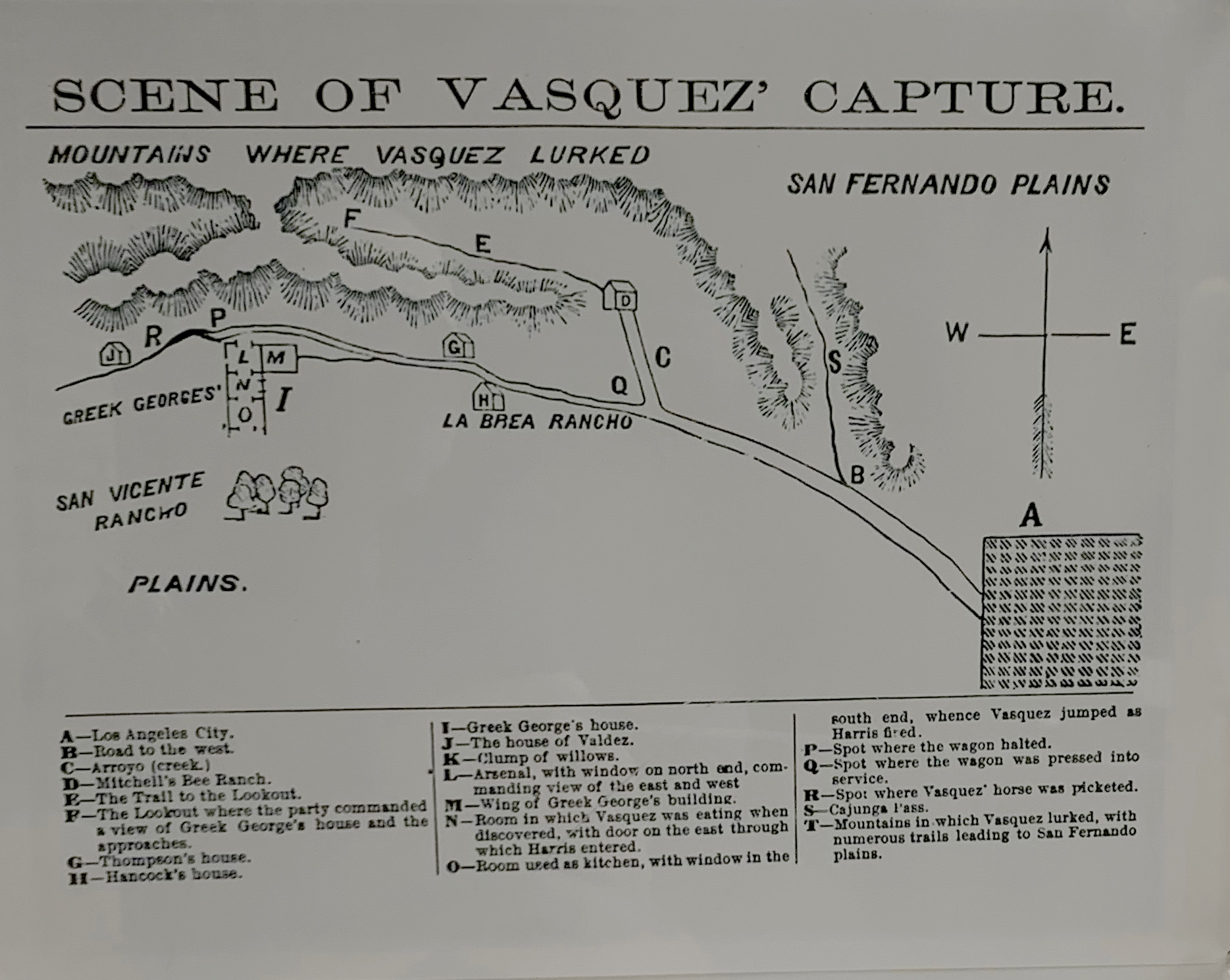
Vintage map of Tiburcio Vásquez's capture

Vásquez took up residence at the adobe home of "Greek George" Caralambo in the northwest corner of Rancho La Brea, located 200 yards (183 m) south of the present-day Sunset Strip in West Hollywood. Greek George was a former camel driver for in the Army Camel Corps. Allegedly, Vásquez seduced and impregnated his own niece. Either the girl's family or Greek George's wife's family betrayed Vásquez to Los Angeles County Sheriff William R. Rowland. Rowland sent a posse to the ranch and captured Vásquez on May 14, 1874. Greek George's adobe was situated near the present-day Melrose Place in West Hollywood, very close to where the movie industry set up shop a few decades later.

Vásquez remained in the Los Angeles County jail for nine days. He had numerous requests for interviews by many newspaper reporters, but agreed to see only three: two from the San Francisco Chronicle and one from the Los Angeles Star. He told them his aim was to return California to Mexican rule. He insisted he was an honorable man and claimed he had never killed anyone.

In late May, Vásquez was moved by steamship to San Francisco. He eventually stood trial in San Jose. Vásquez quickly became a celebrity among many of his fellow Hispanic Californians. He admitted that he was an outlaw, but again denied he had ever killed anyone. A note purportedly written by Clodoveo Chávez, one of his gang members, was dropped into a Wells Fargo box. Chávez wrote that he, not Vásquez, had shot the men at Tres Pinos. Nevertheless, at his trial Vásquez admitted participating in the Tres Pinos raid. In January 1875, Vásquez was convicted and sentenced to hang for murder. His trial had taken four days and the jury deliberated for only two hours before finally finding him guilty of one count of murder in the Tres Pinos robbery.

Visitors still flocked to Vásquez's jail cell, many of them women. He signed autographs and posed for photographs. Vásquez sold the photos from the window of his cell and used the money to pay for his legal defense. After his conviction, he appealed for clemency. It was denied by Governor Romualdo Pacheco. Vásquez calmly met his fate in San Jose on March 19, 1875. He was 39 years old.

== Legacy ==
Vásquez's legacy has been subject to much debate over the ensuing decades since his execution. For quite a long time after his death, popular culture tended to regard Vásquez as a mere dangerous bandit of the Southwest. The Chicano Civil Rights Movement prompted the publication of Chicano scholarship and artistic works that challenged this notion and instead posited a more nuanced perspective on Vásquez as a victim of injustice and resistance fighter against Anglo-American discrimination. Chicano scholars and artists used Vásquez's story as an example of the persistent anti-Californio discrimination following the Mexican-American War. To this day, many continue to visit and pay respects to Vásquez's grave. He was buried in Santa Clara Mission Cemetery in Santa Clara, California.

With his refined manners, Californio background, and affection for the ladies, Vásquez is thought to have been one of several sources for the bandit-hero character Zorro.

The actor Anthony Caruso played Vásquez in Stories of the Century.

Armand Alzamora (1928–2009) played Vásquez in the 1957 episode, "The Last Bad Man" of the syndicated anthology series, Death Valley Days, hosted by Stanley Andrews. The segment focuses on Vásquez's early life of crime, his hatred for the US takeover of California, the prison escape, and his hanging at the age of 39.

Vásquez was the main subject of a play by famous Chicano playwright and director Luis Valdez in his 1982 stage play Bandido! The play helped popularize the story of Tiburcio Vásquez to a new generation of young Chicanos and Chicanas in the latter 20th century. Through the lens of satire, Valdez uses the life story of Vásquez not just as a storytelling device to critique the traditional mythology of Manifest Destiny but also harmful stereotypes towards Mexican-Americans. As with Valdez's other works, themes of poverty and discrimination against Californios like Vásquez are used to draw attention to the intergenerational socio-political problems that face the Chicano community to the current day.

In 1971, at the height of the Chicano Rights Movement, a coalition of local groups in Alameda California, including the Brown Berets, established a nonprofit health clinic named after Vásquez aimed at fighting health disparities among Chicano and migrant communities.

The trunk and knife that belonged to Vásquez are on display at the Andres Pico Adobe in Mission Hills, part of the San Fernando Valley Historical Society collection.

=== Places named for Vásquez ===
==== Geographical features ====
- Vasquez Rocks, an area of distinctive rock formations in the Sierra Pelona Mountains, popular as a filming location for movies and television
- Vásquez Canyon in Saugus, California
- Vásquez Tree, outside of the 21-Mile House, in Morgan Hill, California
- Vásquez day use area in the Angeles National Forest
- Tiburcio's X and (Vasquez's) Monolith, two rock faces popular with climbers in Pinnacles National Park, were named for the legend that Vásquez hid out in a cave below the Monolith.
- Robbers Roost, also known as "Bandit Rock", in Kern County, is named for Vásquez and his gang, who used it as a hideout.

==== Buildings and facilities ====
- Tiburcio Vásquez Health Center, Hayward, California and Union City
- Vásquez High School in Acton, California
- The Alisal Union School District near Salinas, California named a new school Tiburcio Vásquez Elementary School in 2012. The choice of name attracted much criticism and the school was renamed to Monte Bella Elementary in 2016.
- Vásquez House in Monterey, California. Vásquez built it for his sister; it is now California Historical Landmark #351.

== Bibliography ==
- "Our History: What's in a name?". Tiburcio Vasquez Health Center. November 24, 2020. Archived from the original on 2022-12-01.
- Acuña, Rodolfo F. (2011), Occupied America: A History of Chicanos (7th ed.), Boston: Longman, ISBN 978-0-205-78618-3
- Boessenecker, John (2010), Bandido: The Life and Times of Tiburcio Vasquez, Norman, Oklahoma: University of Oklahoma Press, ISBN 978-0-8061-4127-5
- Boessenecker, John (2012). "Bandido: The Countless Love Affairs of Tiburcio Vasquez" (PDF). Bulletin. No. 102. California State Library Foundation. pp. 6–11. Archived from the original (PDF) on 2014-07-28.
- Deutch, Joann (August 10, 2008). "In The Hills Truth Meets Fiction". Canyon News. Archived from the original on 2016-05-09.
- Roddy, W. Lee (1970). Wanted! Black Bart and Other California Outlaws. Ceres, California.
- Rubine, David (1995), Climber's Guide to Pinnacles National Monument, Globe Pequot, ISBN 9780934641890
- Said, Samira (January 3, 2013). "Villain or hero? Flap over California school named for bandit". CNN.
