= Tyller Williamson =

Mayor of Monterey, California

- Williamson outside of the Mayor's office, near Colton Hall

Mayor of Monterey
- Incumbent
- Assumed office November 2022
- Preceded by: Clyde Roberson

Councilmember of the City Council of Monterey
- Incumbent
- Assumed office 2018

Personal details
- Education: California State University, Monterey Bay; Naval Postgraduate School

Tyller Williamson is the first black and first openly gay Mayor of Monterey. He has been serving in this position since the election of November 2022. His current term will expire in December. He joined the City Council of Monterey in 2018, where he is also the first openly gay member, the first black council-member, and the youngest person ever elected to the council.
