= Governor Alvarado House =

Historic site in California

- Alvarado House
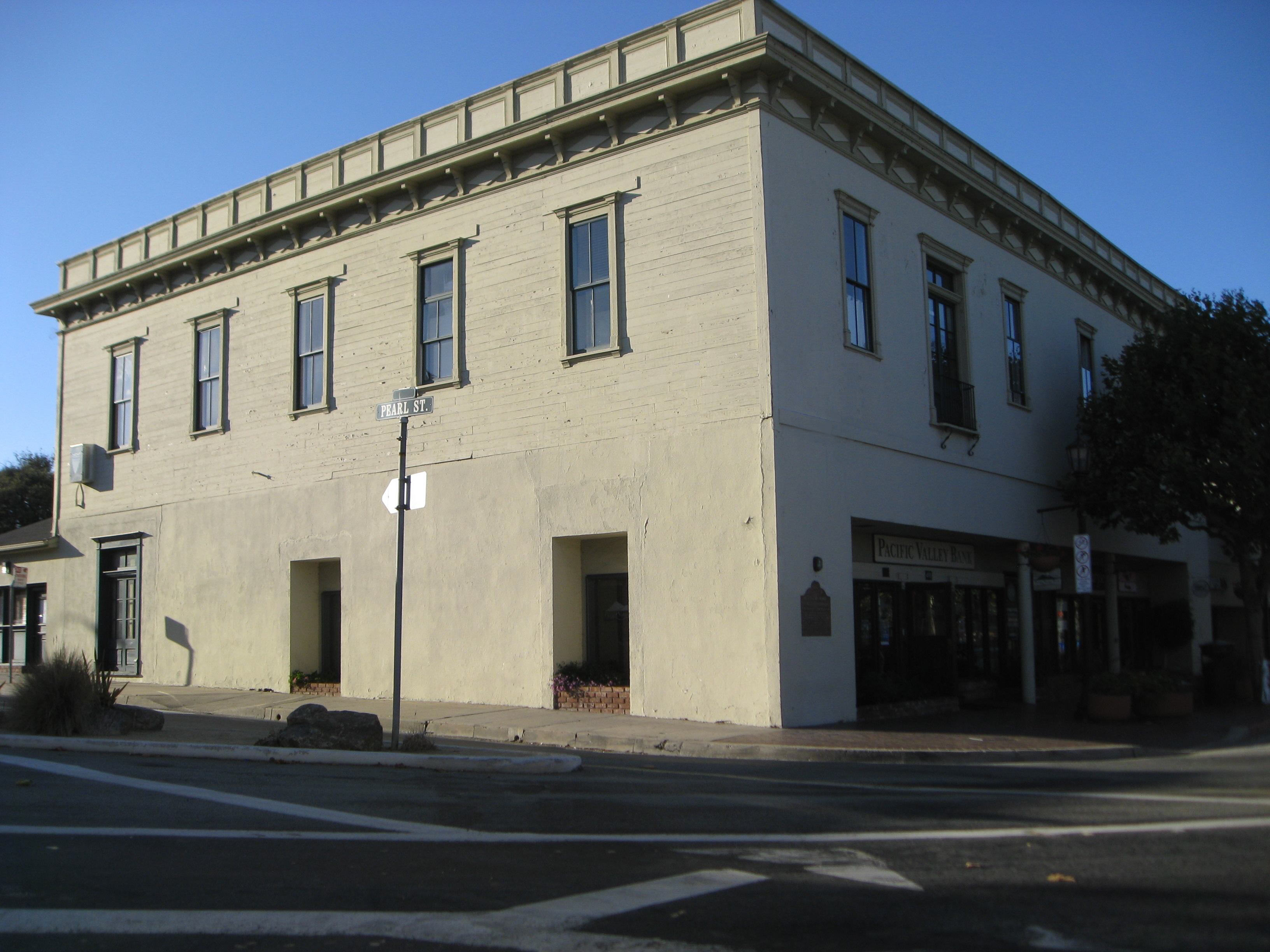
- Alvarado House in 2012

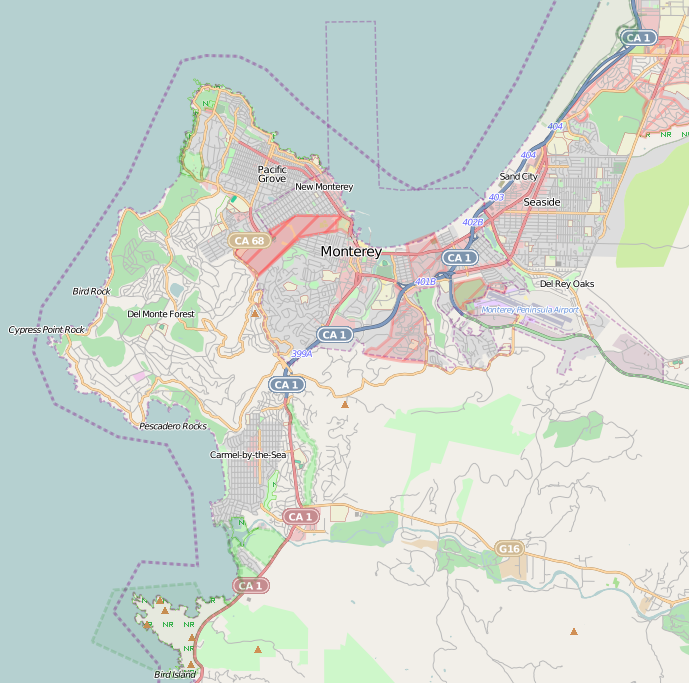
- Location in the Monterey Peninsula
- 36°35′52″N 121°53′41″W
- Location: 494-498 Alvarado Street, Monterey, California

History
- Built: 1836; 190 years ago
- Built for: Juan Bautista Alvarado
- Original use: Residence

Site notes
- Architectural styles: Adobe and wood
- Restored: 1936; 90 years ago
- Current use: Bank branch
- Website: ohp.parks.ca.gov/ListedResources/Detail/348

California Historical Landmark
- Reference no.: 348

The Governor Alvarado House also known as the Alvarado House, is a historic adobe and wood building in Monterey, California, United States. It was built as a lodging house for Juan Bautista Alvarado, the Governor of Alta California from December 20, 1836, to December 20, 1842. On August 8, 1939, the building was officially designated a California Historical Landmark #348. The Governor Alvarado House is part of the Monterey State Historic Park that includes 17 historic buildings in Monterey's old town historic district.

== History ==
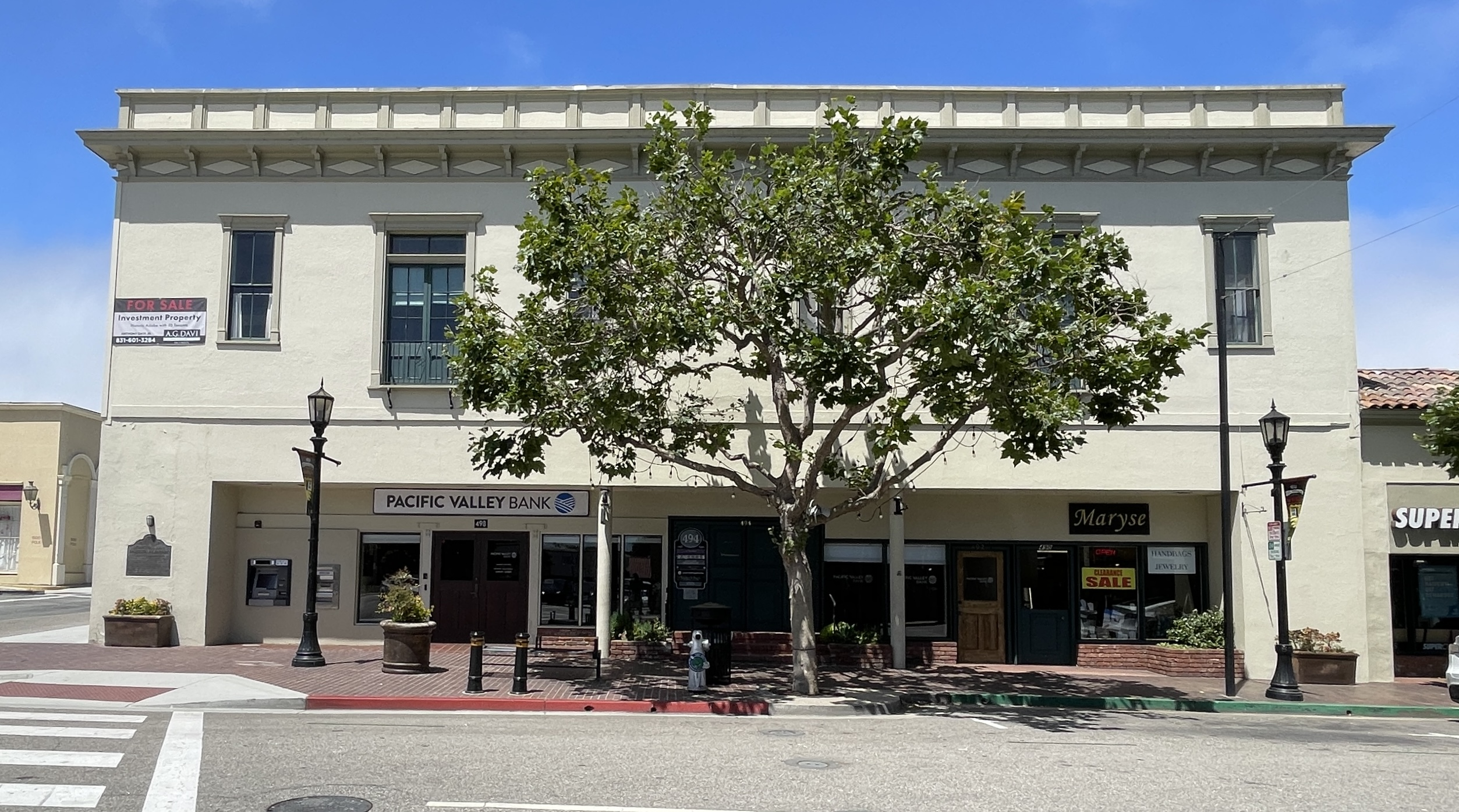
Governor Alvarado House on Alvarado and Pearl Streets

The Governor Alvarado House is located at 494-498 Alvarado Street in downtown Monterey. The building is part of the Monterey State Historic Park that includes 17 historic buildings in Monterey's old town historic district.

Previously referred to as the La Porte building, it was valued at $6,000 (equivalent to $200,172 in 2025) and assessed to Governor Alvarado. In 1874, the La Porte Brothers acquired the building, added a framed second story, and renamed it La Porte Hall. The adobe is sometimes referred to as the Burns Building because Viola La Porte married Edward Burns and he inherited the property. After Viola Burns died, the building was inherited by her children.

On August 23, 1949, the Monterey Parlor 74, Native Sons of the Golden West and the California Centennials Commission placed a plaque on the building, commemorating it as the office of Governor Alvarado. This was part of the centennial celebration honoring Alvarado's life and achievements.

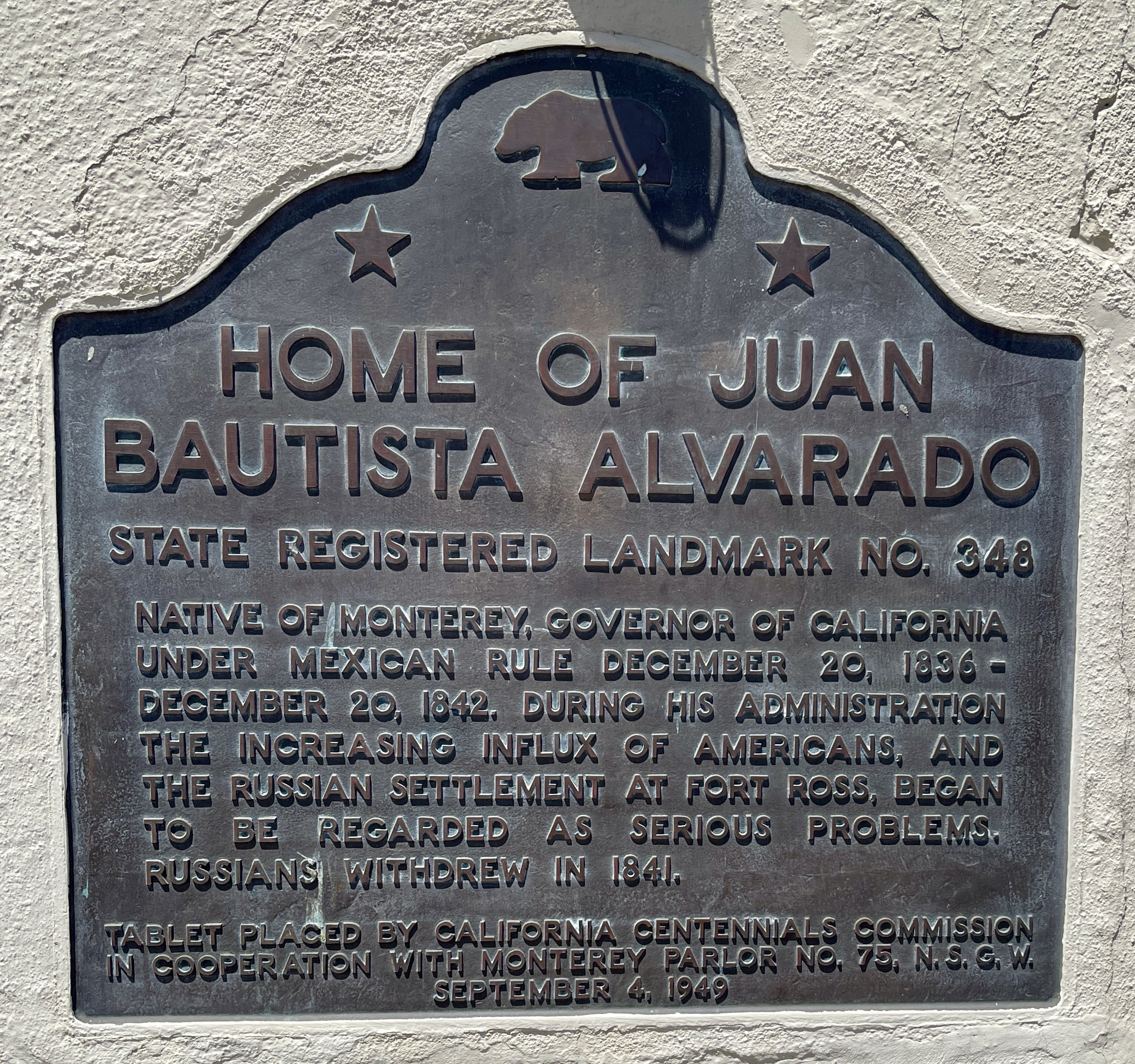
Governor Alvarado House Plaque

The California Historical Landmark plaque reads:

NO. 348 HOUSE OF GOVERNOR ALVARADO - A native of Monterey, Alvarado served as Governor of Mexican California from December 20, 1836 to December 20, 1842. During his administration the increasing influx of Americans and the Russian settlement at Fort Ross began to be regarded as serious problems.

The Governor Alvarado House is now occupied by a local bank branch. The building was damaged in January 2023, during the 2022–2023 California floods.

== See also ==
- California Historical Landmarks in Monterey County
