= Walter Colton =

American Alcalde (mayor) of Monterey, California

Reverend Walter Colton
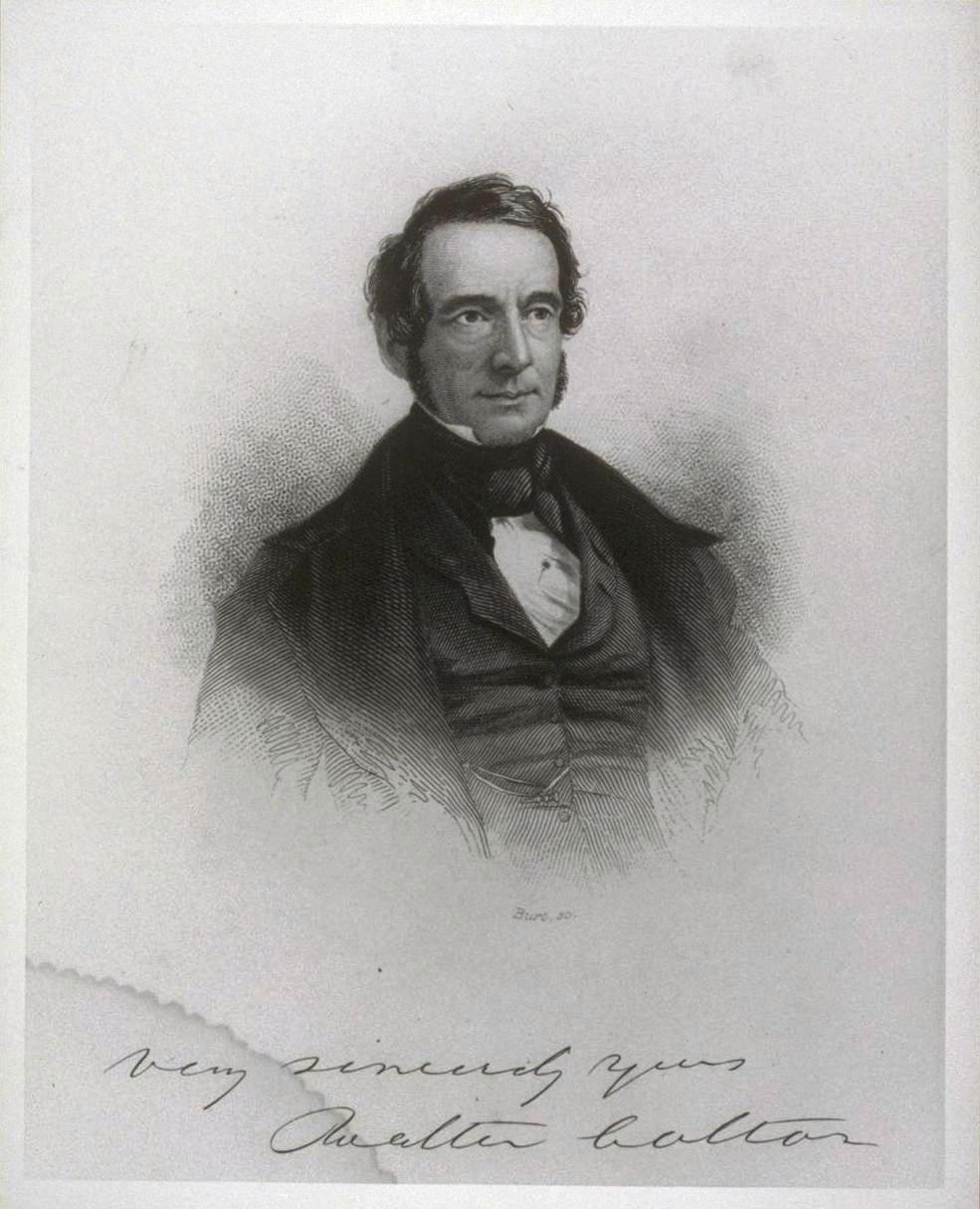

1st American Alcalde of Monterey
- In office September 15, 1846 – 1849
- Preceded by: Self
- Succeeded by: Don Florencio Serrano

Acting American Alcalde of Monterey
- In office July 30, 1846 – September 15, 1846
- Appointed by: Commodore Stockton
- Preceded by: Rodman Price (acting); Edward Gilchrist (acting)

Personal details
- Born: May 7, 1797 Rutland County, Vermont, U.S.
- Died: January 22, 1851 (aged 53)
- Resting place: Laurel Hill Cemetery, Philadelphia, Pennsylvania, U.S.
- Occupation: Politician, newspaper editor and publisher, U.S. Navy chaplain

Reverend Walter Colton (May 7, 1797 – January 22, 1851) was an American clergyman and writer from Vermont who served as the first American Alcalde (mayor) of Monterey, California. He worked as an editor for newspapers in Washington, D.C., and Philadelphia, as a chaplain in the United States Navy and as co-publisher of California's first newspaper, The Californian, in 1846. He wrote several books about his travels to California and Europe.

== Biography ==
=== Early life and education ===
Walter Colton was born in Rutland County, Vermont, on May 9, 1797. He was the third of 12 children born to Walter and Thankful (Cobb) Colton; his nephew John Jay Colton later became known as a pioneer of anesthesia. Walter moved to Hartford, Connecticut, at the age of 17 to learn to be a cabinetmaker.

He attended Hartford Grammar School and entered Yale in the fall of 1818. He won the Berkeleyan Prize for the best Latin translation, and delivered the valedictory poem at his graduation in 1822. He entered Andover Theological Seminary and graduated in 1825. He became a professor of moral philosophy and letters at the Scientific and Military Academy at Middletown, Connecticut.

=== Career ===
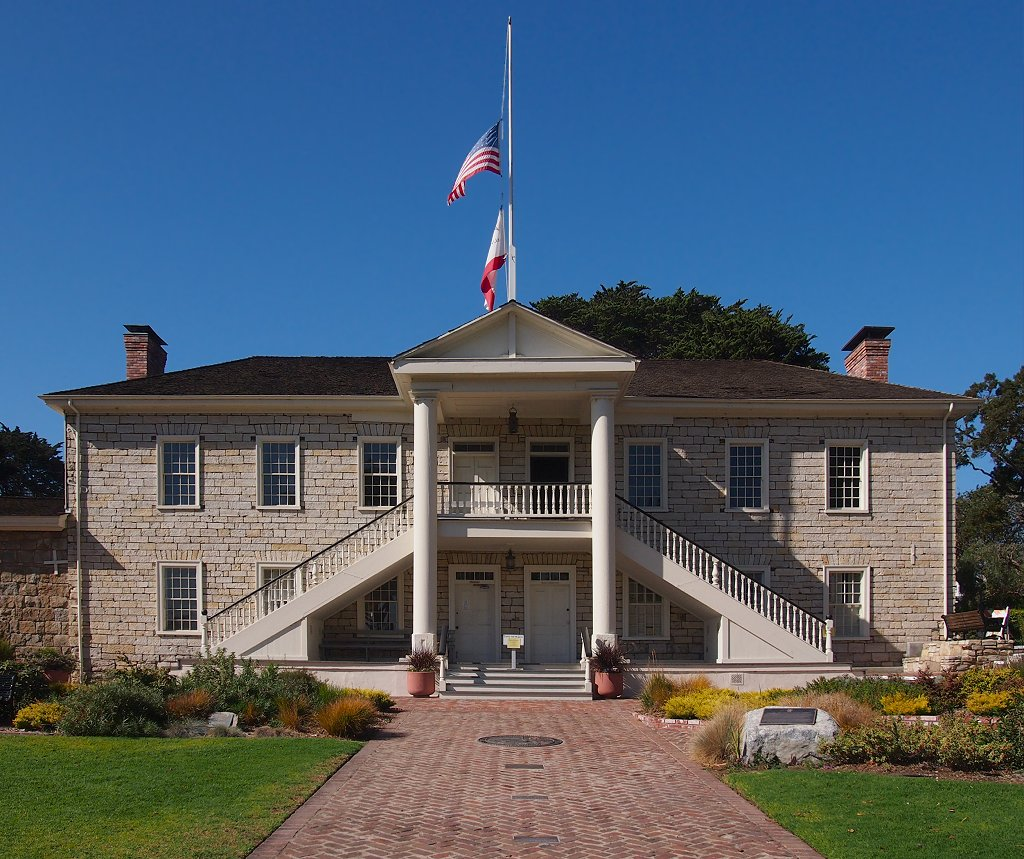
Colton Hall was built by Colton for use as a town hall and school house. It was the site of the 1849 California Constitutional Convention

In 1828 he moved to Washington, D.C., to become the editor of the American Spectator and Washington City Chronicle. He was also elected to preach at a church attended by President Andrew Jackson. The men developed a close acquaintanceship. The president offered Colton the choice of being a chaplain in the Navy or a consul abroad. Colton was nominated chaplain of the West India Squadron in 1831 and visited ports throughout the world. Colton worked on several newspapers in Philadelphia during the 1840s including the North American. He was married to a Philadelphia woman of the same family name, and he sailed to the Pacific in 1845. He recorded the story of that eventful voyage in his book, Deck and Port.

Soon after Colton's arrival in Monterey as chaplain of the USS Congress, Commodore Robert F. Stockton appointed him the first American Alcalde of Monterey, a title he held from 1846 to 1849. The role was a combination of judge, sheriff, and governor. He had no legal education or experience but used his innate sense of fairness to render decisions. He held court armed with a revolver and bejeweled cane which were the symbols of authority for an alcalde. He served with wisdom and sound judgment in dealing with lawbreakers. He built Colton Hall for use as a town hall and school. It was built through the labor of convicts and paid for partly through taxes on liquor shops and fines on gamblers. He won wide acclaim as a fair judge and impaneled the first jury in California to assist in making decisions.

He and Robert B. Semple launched the first newspaper published in California, The Californian on August 15, 1846. The first issue was released only a month after the American flag was raised at Monterey, The Californian carried the news of the declaration of war with Mexico.

Colton's book about his experiences, Three Years in California, was published in 1850 after his return to the east. He died in 1851 and was buried in Laurel Hill Cemetery in Philadelphia.

== Legacy ==
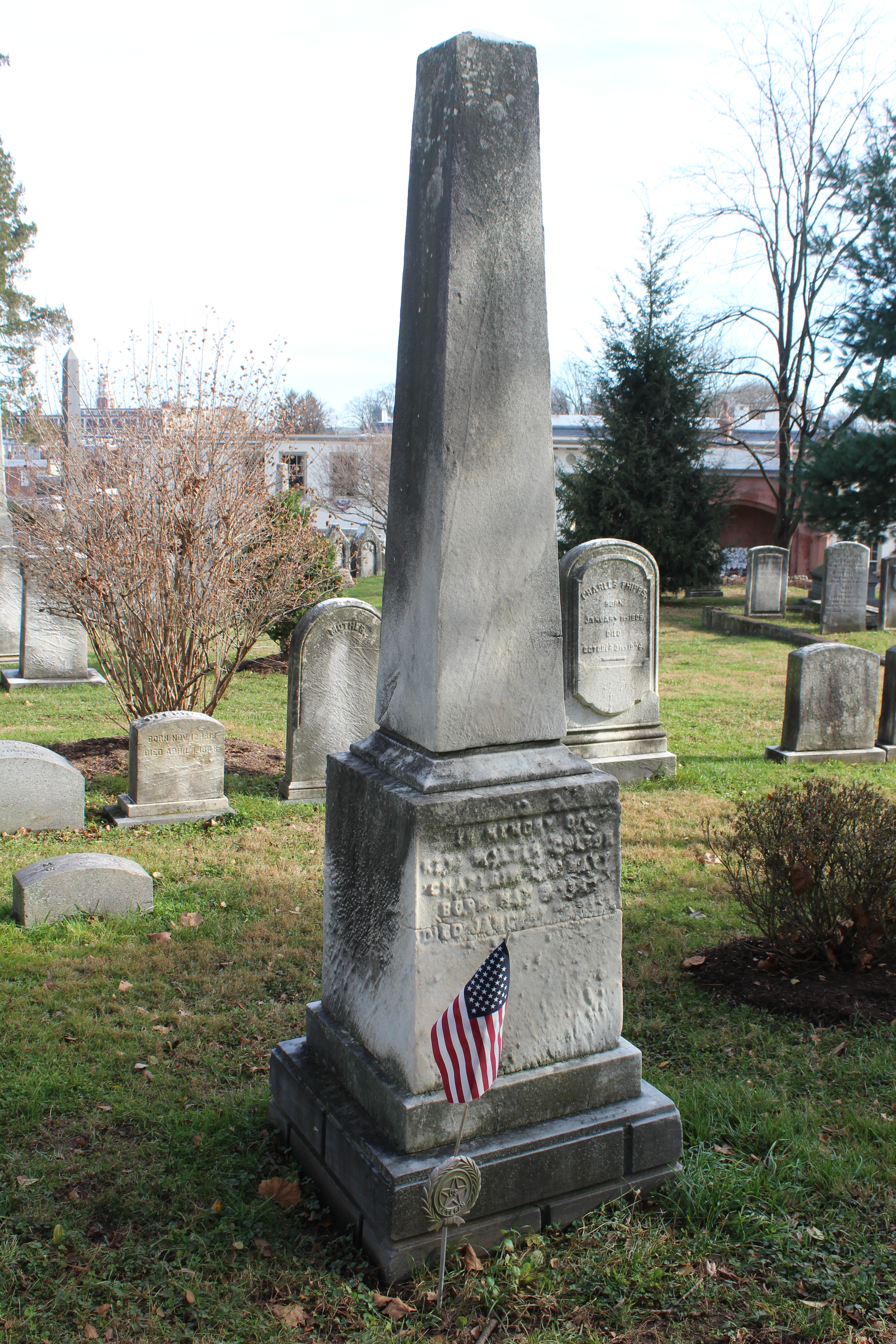
Walter Colton tombstone in Laurel Hill Cemetery, Philadelphia

Walter Colton has been inducted into the California Newspaper Hall of Fame. His book, Three years in California, is regarded as a principal description of California before the California Gold Rush.

Colton Hall, now preserved as a museum, was the site of the 1849 California Constitutional Convention. For a time it served as a grade school.

The Walter Colton Middle School, located some two miles uphill from Colton Hall, was named in his honor and is a part of the Monterey Peninsula Unified School District.

== Bibliography ==
- The Sea and the Sailor: Notes on France and Italy, and Other Literary Remains of Rev. Walter Colton, New York, A.S. Barnes & Co., 1846
- Visit to Constantinople and Athens, Dublin, James M'Glashan, 1849
- Three Years in California, New York, A.S. Barnes & Co., 1850
- Land and Lee in the Bosphorus and Aegean; or Views of Athens and Constantinople, New York, A.S. Barnes & Co., 1851
- Deck and Port: Or, Incidents of a Cruise in the United States Frigate Congress to California - with Sketches of Rio Janeiro, Valparaiso, Lima, Honolulu, and San Francisco, New York, A.S. Barnes & Co., 1860
- Ship and Shore, in Madeira, Lisbon, and the Mediterranean, New York, A.S. Barnes & Co., 1860
