= Robbers Roost (Kern County, California) =

- U.S. National Register of Historic Places
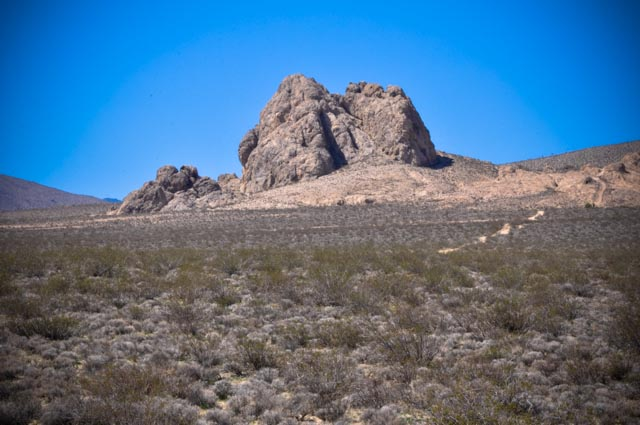

- Location within California Location within the United States
- Location: Kern County, California
- Coordinates: 35°35′30.91″N 117°56′51.35″W
- Area: 5 acres (2.0 ha)
- NRHP reference No.: 75000431
- Added to NRHP: October 31, 1975

Robbers Roost (unincorporated Kern County, California, also known as Robber's Roost and Bandit Rock) is a rock formation in the foothills of the Scodie Mountains portion of the Southern Sierra Nevada Mountain Range in the North Mojave Desert. The formation overlooks the southern portion of the Indian Wells Valley. The nearest municipality is Ridgecrest, California. The Los Angeles Aqueduct is within several hundred yards of the formation. The area is managed by the Bureau of Land Management. Robbers Roost lies west of Freeman Junction, which is approximately at the intersection of California highways 178 and 14.

== History ==
In the 19th century, outlaws were known to use Robbers Roost to spot stagecoaches moving south towards Los Angeles through the Antelope Valley from the Owens Valley or west through Walker Pass towards the San Joaquin Valley. Modern-day Walker Pass is State Route 178. Stagecoaches in this area often carried gold and other valuable gems from the local mines.

The jagged rocks were a hideout for Kern County's most notorious bandit gang, led by Tiburcio Vásquez.

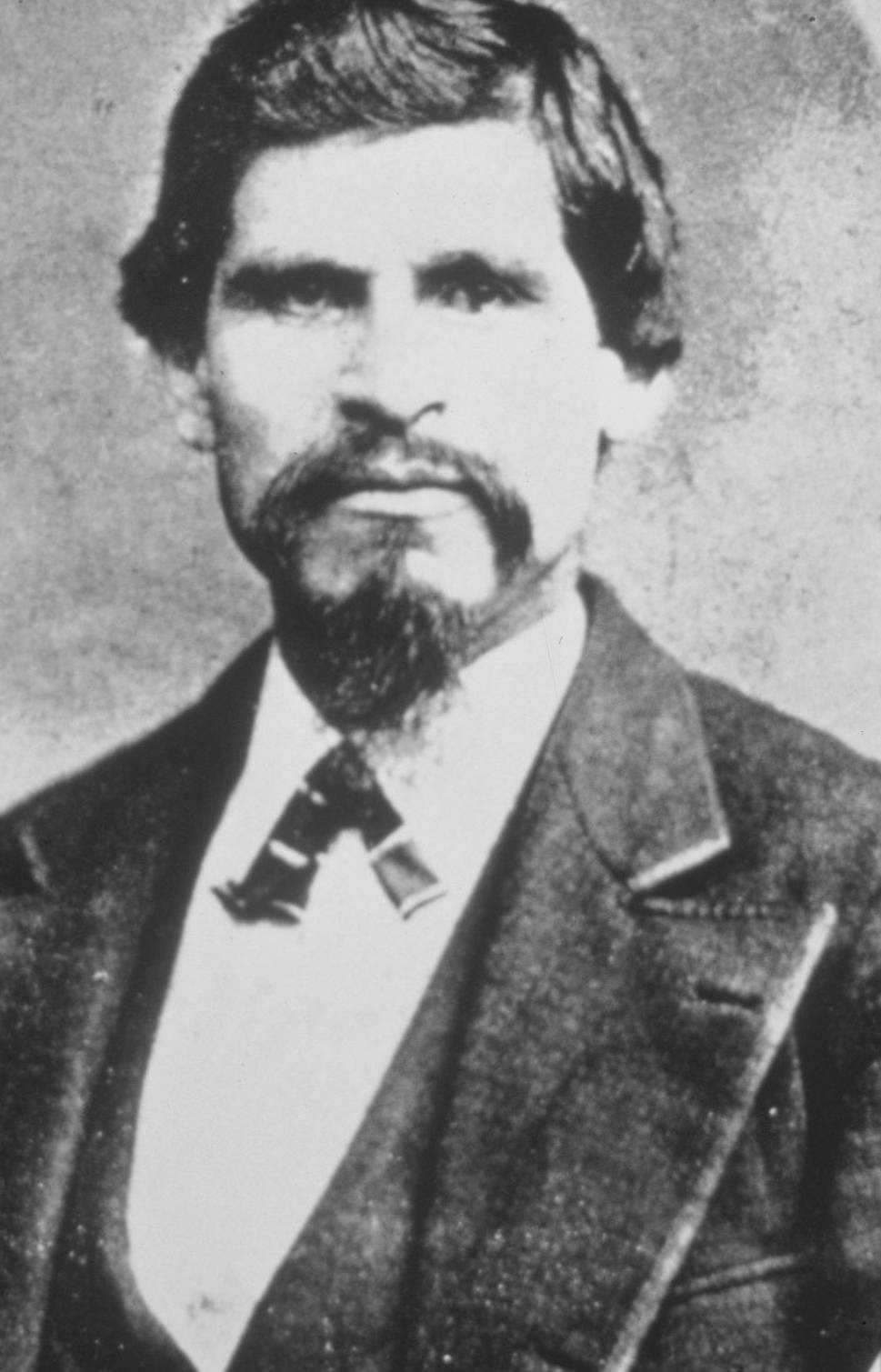
Tiburcio Vásquez

Robbers Roost was listed on the National Register of Historic Places in 1975.

== Accessibility ==
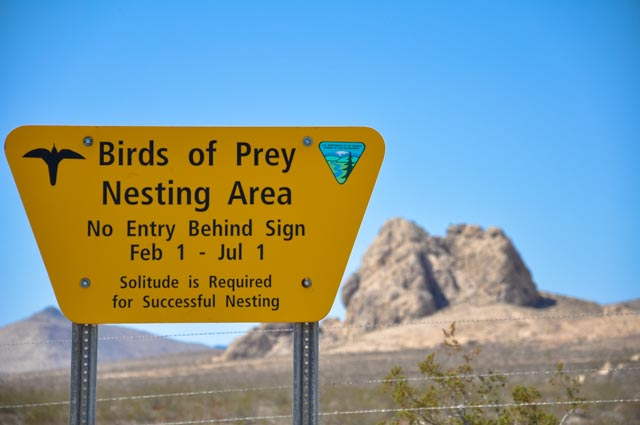
Sign indicating border of nesting area

Robber's Roost is closed from February 1 through July 1 to allow solitude for bird of prey nesting.

== See also ==
- History of the Mojave Desert region
- National Register of Historic Places listings in Kern County, California
- Vasquez Rocks — rock outcrops used by Vásquez in Los Angeles County.
