= 21-Mile House =

Historical landmark in Santa Clara County, California

Vásquez Tree and site of 21-Mile House
- Tennant's Station
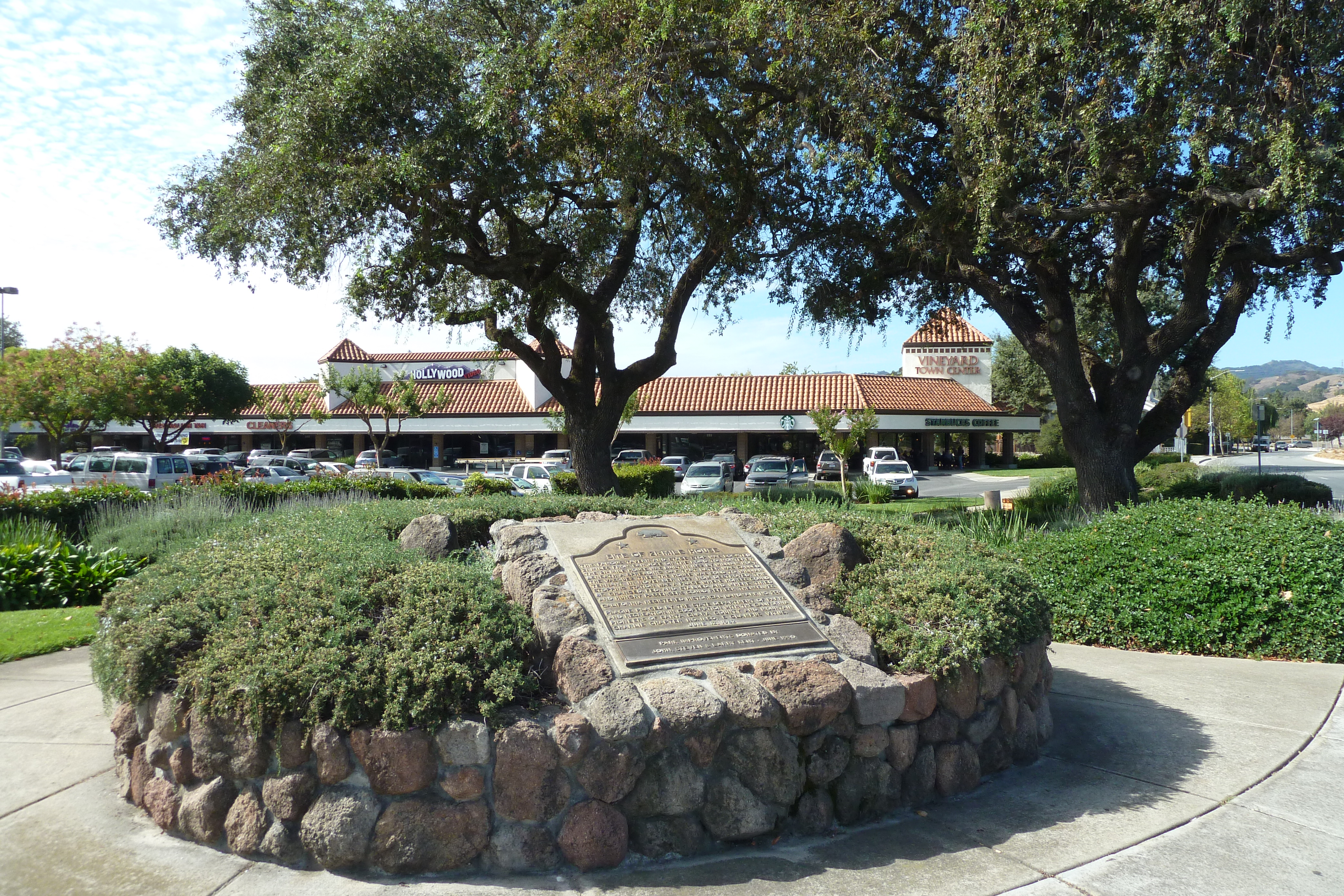
- Bronze plaque for the 21-Mile House site

- Location in Santa Clara County
- 37°6′47″N 121°38′38″W
- Location: Tennant Avenue and Monterey Highway Morgan Hill, California, US

History
- Founded: 1852
- Founder: William Host
- Original use: Stagecoach rest stop
- Demolished: 1915

California Historical Landmark
- Official name: Site Of 21-Mile House
- Designated: June 12, 1982
- Reference no.: 259

The 21-Mile House was a tavern and stagecoach rest stop located 21 miles away from San Jose, California along the route to Monterey. The house evolved into a station stop for the Butterfield Overland Stage. The 21-Mile-House, constructed in 1852 by William Host beneath an oak tree later known as the Vásquez Tree, changed ownership to William Tennant in November 1852. Although it no longer stands today, this station played a crucial role in facilitating the changing, feeding, and stabling of horses, as well as providing passengers with refreshment. The California Historical Landmark #259 bronze plaque serves to commemorate the 21-Mile House site.

== History ==
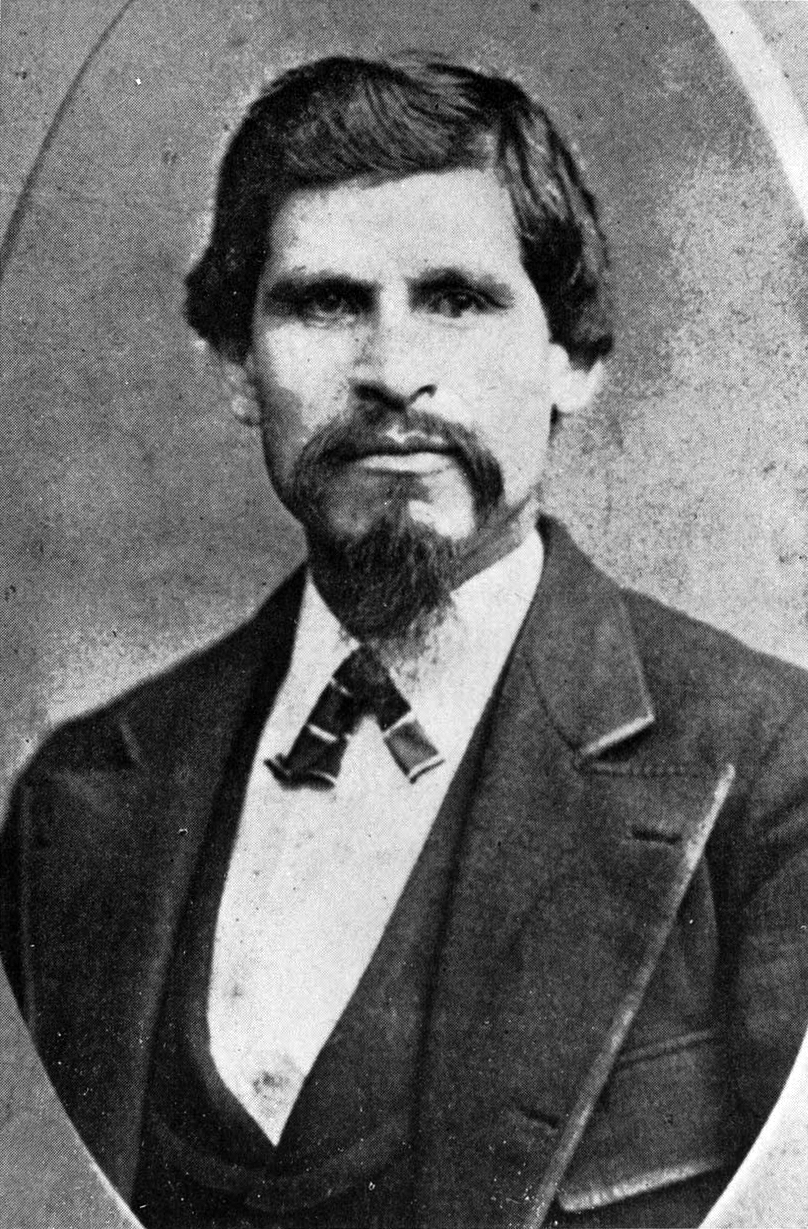
Outlaw Tiburcio Vásquez (1835-1875) held a robbery at the 21-Mile House.

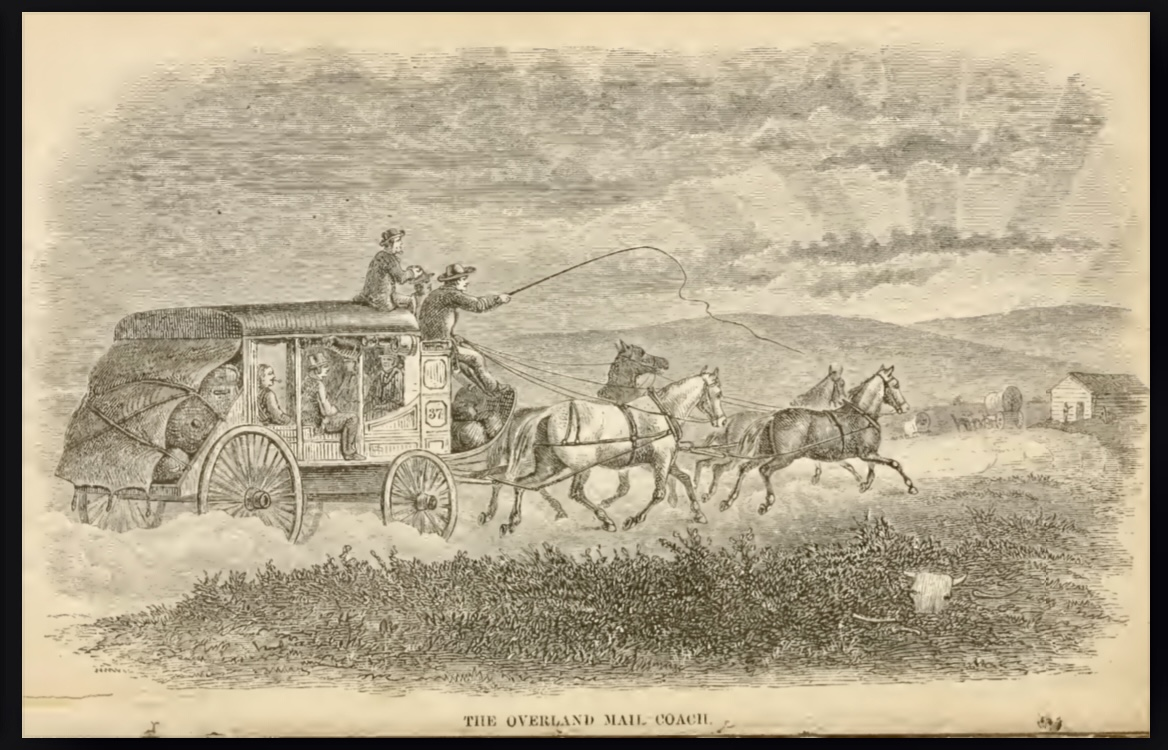
The Overland Mail Coach.

The route between downtown San Jose and Gilroy featured several stagecoach stops, and among them was the 21-Mile House. In the period from 1860 to 1882, the 12-Mile House was located in the Burnett Township, which is now part of Coyote, California. The township was named after the first elected Governor of California, Peter H. Burnett. The 12-Mile House played a role in the operations of the Southern Pacific Railroad. It was the first frame building constructed in the township, initially serving as a two-story residence 20 ft (6.1 m) by 25 ft (7.6 m), built in 1852 by William Host, beneath the Vásquez oak tree. In November 1852. the property changed hands, with William Tennant (1830–1885) becoming the new owner. Tennant, who was originally a piano tuner, and his family, originating from County Wexford, Ireland, took on the roles of owner and operator of the establishment. The house was destroyed by fire in 1853 but was reconstructed as a two-story structure measuring 22 ft (6.7 m) by 36 ft (11 m), featuring two wings of dimensions, 18 ft (5.5 m) by 20 ft (6.1 m) and 16 ft (4.9 m) by 18 ft (5.5 m). The house was commonly known as "Tennant Station" during his ownership as it became a stop for the Butterfiled Overland Stage in 1860. Additionally, in 1879, Tennant held the position of the town's postmaster that was established at the "21-Mile House" tavern on April 5, 1871. Tennant continued to serve the stage drivers and travelers until his death on June 22, 1885.

In 1915, D. Y. Jones purchased the property, demolished the existing building, and erected a modern house in its stead. Some of the lumber salvaged from the old tavern was repurposed in the construction of the new structure. In later years, the 21-Mile house was initially owned by the Casella family and subsequently by Lewis E. Downer from 1920 to 1936. Downer changed it to the 21 Mile Service Station, which kept the 21-Mile name alive. From 1936 to 1976, the 21 Mile House became a fruit stand, which was owned and operated by several different families. The rerouting of Highway 101 in 1972 led to a decline in business, resulting in the closure of the establishment. Subsequently, the Kant Group took on the task of developing a shopping center and establishing a park around the remaining oak trees. Today, this location is known as the Vineyard Town Center.

Between 1861 and 1864, American botanist William H. Brewer and his party visited the 21-Mile House on three occasions. On each visit, they chose to camp outdoors rather than staying inside the tavern. Brewer's journal entry for a May evening in 1864 reads as follows: "We got to the 21-Mile House and camped under the old oak trees. We had camped there before, once in ‘61, and again in ‘62. The spot seemed familiar and awoke pleasing memories, and that night, on the ground under the trees, sweeter sleep came than had for many a long night before."

On July 24, 1873, a robbery occurred at the 21-Mile House when bandido Tiburcio Vásquez (1835-1875) and five accomplices rode up to the establishment. They showed their revolvers, subdued the four men present in the barroom, and proceeded to bind them. They thoroughly searched both their captives and the premises, confiscating all available money and valuables. Following his trial in San Jose, Vásquez was executed there on March 19, 1875. The Vásquez Tree, that stood under the 21-Mile House, was named as a tribute to Tiburcio Vásquez.

The Vásquez Oak, beneath which the 21-Mile House tavern once stood, is located twenty-one miles to the south of San Jose, California, within Santa Clara County. For over three-quarters of a century, this oak tree had served as a landmark for travelers. Today, the site is a State Historical Landmark, a symbol commemorating the bygone days of California's early history when travel was undertaken by stagecoach and six-horse teams at the pace of ten miles per hour.

== Landmark status ==
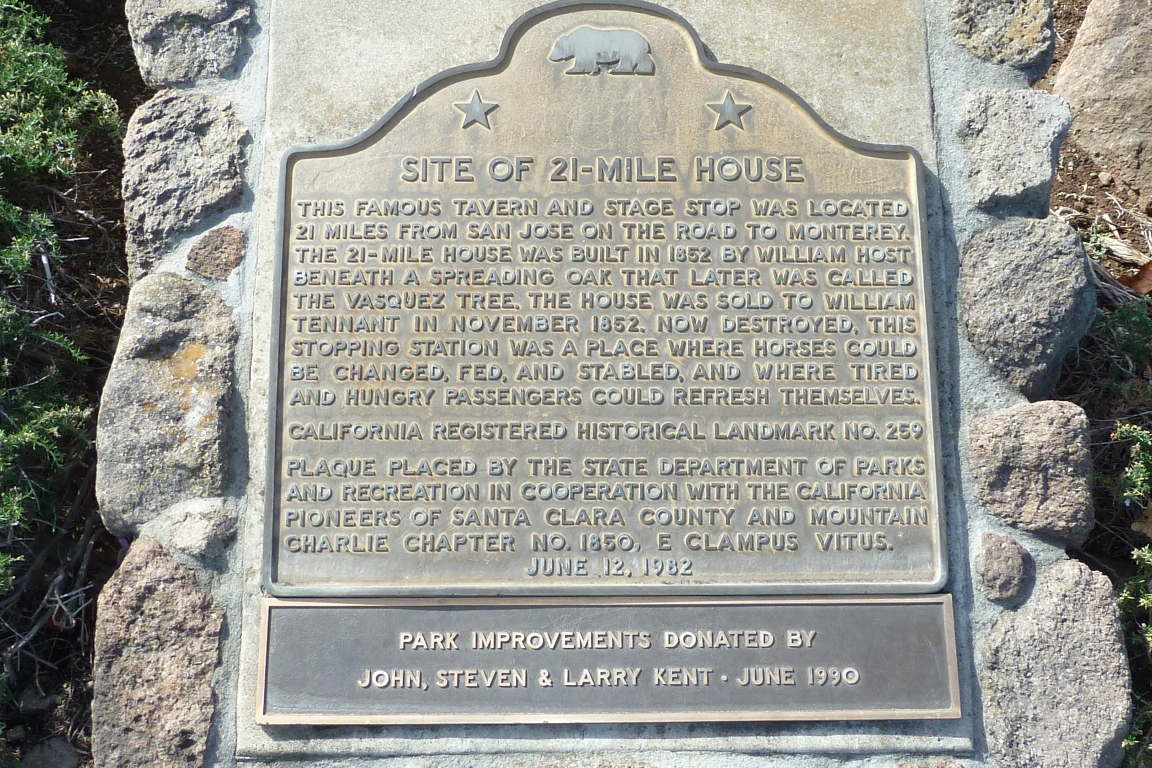
21-Mile House site plaque

On September 3, 1937, the Santa Clara County Chamber of Commerce declared the site of the 21-Mile House a California Historical Landmark #259. On June 12, 1982, the California State Parks in cooperation with the California Pioneers of Santa Clara County and Mountain Charlie Chapter No. 1850, E Clampus Vitus, erected a commemorative bronze plaque, that designates the site of the 21-Mile House. The marker is located at the located at the intersection of Tennant Avenue and Monterey Highway in Morgan Hill, California. The inscription on the plaque reads:

"This famous tavern and stage stop was located 21 miles from San Jose on the road to Monterey. The 21-Mile-House was built in 1852 by William Host beneath a spreading oak that later was called the Vasquez Tree. The house was sold to William Tennant in November 1852. Now destroyed, this stopping station was a place where horses could be changed, fed, and stabled, and where tired and hungry passengers could refresh themselves."

== See also ==
- California Historical Landmarks in Santa Clara County
