= California Historical Landmarks in Monterey County =

This list includes properties and districts listed on the California Historical Landmark listing in Monterey County, California, United States. Click the "Map of all coordinates" link to the right to view an online map of all properties and districts with latitude and longitude coordinates in the table below.

Image		Landmark name	Location	City or town	Summary
Asilomar State Beach and Conference Grounds	1052	Asilomar State Beach and Conference Grounds	800 Asilomar Ave. 36°37′08″N 121°56′18″W	Pacific Grove	Registered February 7, 2014 and dedicated on the 150th anniversary of the California State Parks
California's First Theater	136	California's First Theater	Pacific & Scott Sts. 36°36′11″N 121°53′44″W	Monterey	Part of Monterey State Historic Park
Casa de Oro	532	Casa de Oro	210 Olivier St. 36°36′10″N 121°53′41″W	Monterey	Part of Monterey State Historic Park
Casa Materna of the Vallejos	387	Casa Materna of the Vallejos	Hillcrest Rd. & Salinas Rd. 36°52′35″N 121°45′43″W	Las Lomas	
Chautauqua Hall	839	Chautauqua Hall	16th St. & Central Ave. 36°37′20″N 121°55′06″W	Pacific Grove	On July 20, 1970, the State Department of Parks and Recreation & City of Pacific Grove erected a landmark marker Number 839 at the Chautauqua Hall in Pacific Grove.
Colton Hall	126	Colton Hall	570 Pacific St. 36°35′52″N 121°53′51″W	Monterey	
Custom House	1	Custom House	Custom House Plaza; 36°36′12″N 121°53′37″W	Monterey	Part of Monterey State Historic Park
Governor Alvarado House	348	Governor Alvarado House	494–498 Alvarado St. 36°35′52″N 121°53′43″W	Monterey	
Gutiérrez Adobe	713	Gutiérrez Adobe	590 Calle Principal; 36°35′49″N 121°53′48″W	Monterey	Part of Monterey State Historic Park
Hill Town Ferry	560	Hill Town Ferry	Spreckels Blvd. & Old Hwy 68; 36°37′47″N 121°40′43″W	Old Hilltown	
House of the Four Winds	353	House of the Four Winds	540 Calle Principal; 36°35′51″N 121°53′47″W	Monterey	Thomas Oliver Larkin built the House of Four Winds, named for the weather vane on its hipped roof. The building was used as an early State of California hall of records.
Jose Eusebio Boronda Adobe	870	Jose Eusebio Boronda Adobe	333 Boronda Rd. 36°42′03″N 121°40′44″W	Salinas	
Landing Place of Vizcaino and Serra	128	Landing Place of Vizcaino and Serra	SW corner of Artillery and Pacific Sts. 36°36′17″N 121°53′43″W	Monterey	
Larkin House	106	Larkin House	Calle Principal & Jefferson St. 36°35′53″N 121°53′46″W	Monterey	Part of Monterey State Historic Park
Mission Nuestra Señora de la Soledad	233	Mission Nuestra Señora de la Soledad	Fort Romie Rd. 36°24′17″N 121°21′21″W	Soledad	
Mission San Antonio de Padua	232	Mission San Antonio de Padua	36°00′55″N 121°15′01″W	Jolon	
Mission San Carlos Borromeo de Carmelo	135	Mission San Carlos Borromeo de Carmelo	Lasuen Dr. and Rio Rd. 36°32′34″N 121°55′13″W	Carmel	
Old Pacific House	354	Old Pacific House	Custom House Plaza; 36°36′09″N 121°53′39″W	Monterey	Part of Monterey State Historic Park
Point Sur Lighthouse	951	Point Sur Lighthouse	Point Sur State Historic Park; 36°18′23″N 121°54′06″W	Big Sur	
Richardson Adobe	494	Richardson Adobe	Los Coches Rancho Wayside Campground; 36°24′15″N 121°19′04″W	Soledad	At Los Coches Rancho NRHP #79000502
Robert Louis Stevenson House	352	Robert Louis Stevenson House	530 Houston St. 36°35′50″N 121°53′36″W	Monterey	Part of Monterey State Historic Park
Royal Presidio Chapel	105	Royal Presidio Chapel	550 Church St. 36°35′44″N 121°53′25″W	Monterey	
Salinas Assembly Center	934	Salinas Assembly Center	940 N. Main St. 36°41′28″N 121°38′56″W	Salinas	
Site of the Battle of Natividad	651	Site of the Battle of Natividad	San Juan Grade & Crazy Horse Canyon Rd. 36°46′23″N 121°36′13″W	Prunedale	
Soberanes Adobe	712	Soberanes Adobe	336 Pacific St. 36°36′05″N 121°53′45″W	Monterey	Part of Monterey State Historic Park
Vásquez House	351	Vásquez House	546 Dutra St. 36°35′52″N 121°53′53″W	Monterey	

== See also ==
- List of California Historical Landmarks
- National Register of Historic Places listings in Monterey County, California
