= Colton Hall =

First seat of government of California

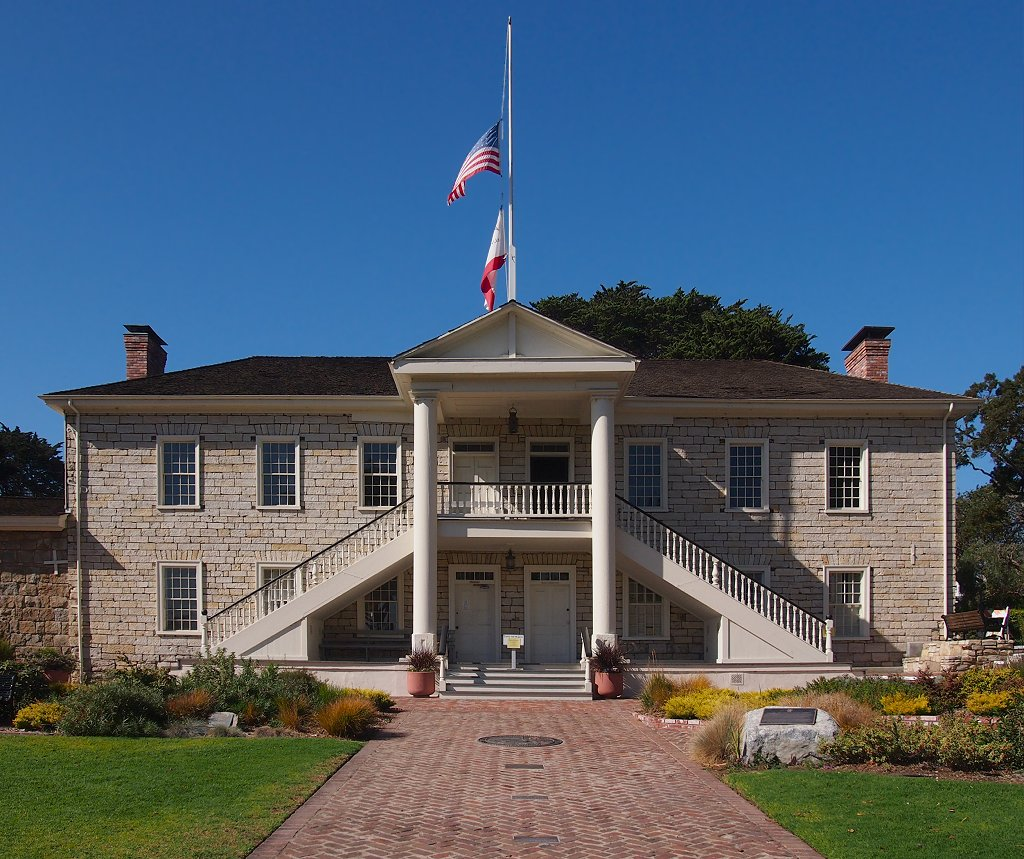
- Colton Hall from the east-southeast

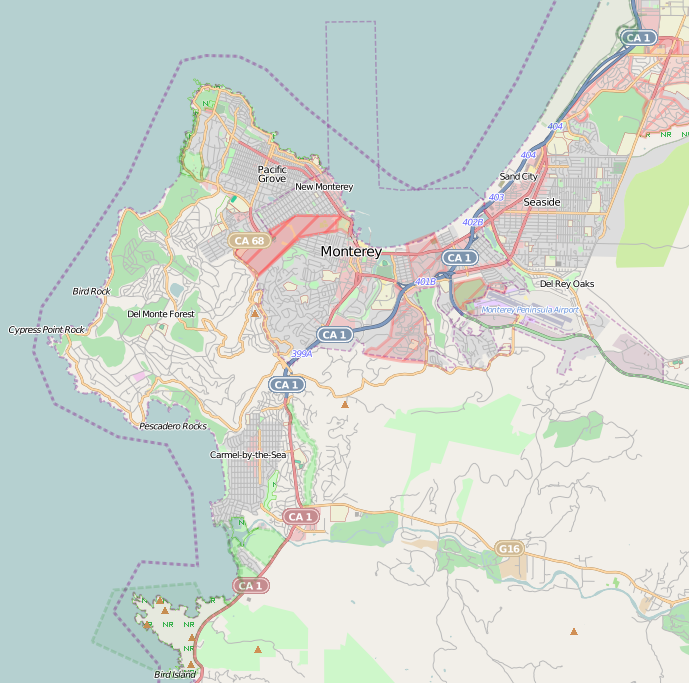
- Location in the Monterey Peninsula
- 36°35′52″N 121°53′51″W
- Location: Monterey, California

History
- Built: 1847–1849

Site notes
- Architect: Walter Colton
- Website: www.monterey.org/museums/City-Museums/Colton-Hall-Museum

California Historical Landmark
- Reference no.: 126

Colton Hall is a government building and museum in Monterey, California, United States. It was built in 1847–49 by Walter Colton, who arrived in Monterey as the chaplain on Commodore Robert F. Stockton's vessel. He remained and was named as Monterey's first alcalde (mayor) in the American Period. Colton Hall originally contained rooms downstairs for a public school and government assembly hall upstairs. It was the site of California's first constitutional convention in 1849.

== Building construction ==
Upon becoming the elected alcalde Colton decided to build a school in Monterey, he decided that it would be in the style of the buildings he was familiar with from Philadelphia and Washington DC, the Greek Revival style. He wrote in his diary,

It is built of white stone [white Monterey shale], quarried from the neighboring hill, and which easily takes the shape you desire. The lower apartments are for schools; the hall over them - seventy feet by thirty - is for public assemblies. The front is ornamented with a portico, which you enter from the hall. It is not an edifice that would attract any attention among public buildings in the United States, but in California, it is without a rival. It has been erected out of the slender proceeds of town lots, the labor of the convicts, taxes on liquor shops, and fines on gamblers. The scheme was regarded with incredulity by many, but the building is finished, and the citizens have assembled in it and christened it after my name, which will now go down to posterity with the odor of gamblers, convicts, and tipplers. I leave it as humble evidence of what may be accomplished by rigidly adhering to one purpose, and shrinking from no personal efforts necessary to its achievement.

— Walter Colton, 1849

As the alcalde, Colton served as mayor, coroner, judge, sheriff, in charge of weights and measures, prosecutor, and a tax collector. In order to raise funds and free labor, Colton took full advantage of his "absolute" powers. He would tax cantinas, alcohol, and gambling, sell city lots, and used the money toward the building. When he found someone "misbehaving" he would arrest them as the sheriff, throw them in jail and act as the judge, often sentencing them to labor on the school. When the building was completed on March 8, 1849, it was the largest public building in California. When his tenure as Alcalde was completed, a citizens committee convened to commend him for his service. They named the new building in his honor "Colton Hall."

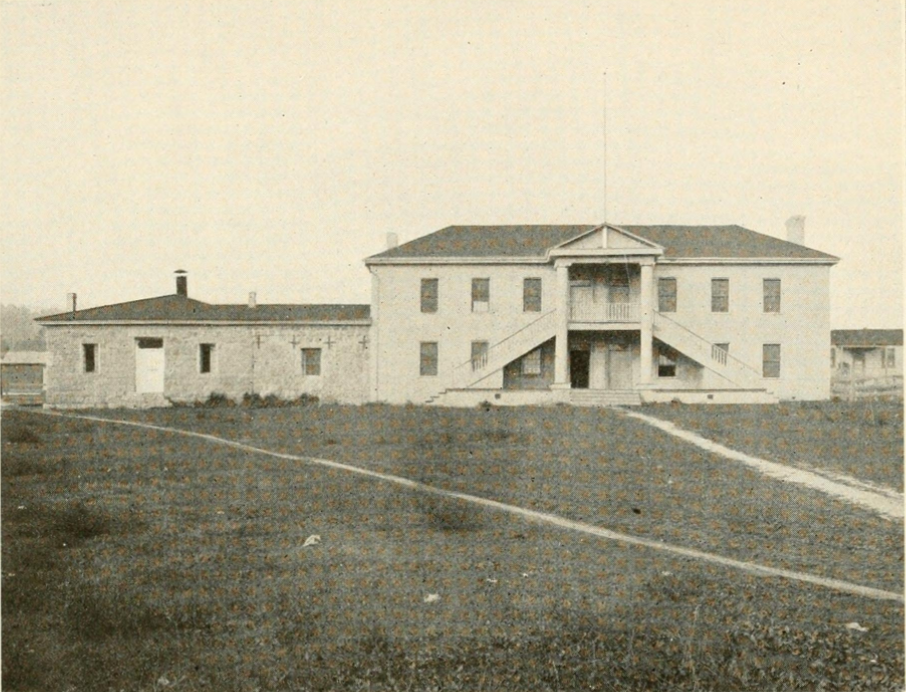
Colton Hall in 1915

The Native Sons of the Golden West were instrumental in 1903 in securing a legislative appropriation for necessary repairs on Colton Hall. The building was then registered as a California Historical Landmark in 1934. A single-story, solid granite block building is attached to the eastern side of Colton Hall. It was the city jail until 1956. The dark, barred cells today display sleeping cots, guitars, and other artifacts that may have been in use by inmates.

In October 2018, the City of Monterey completed a $353, 000 renovation. This included a back stairway, deck, courtyard, and parking lot. The building became compliant with the American Disabilities Act with the installation of a chair lift and ADA restroom. “'We are excited to welcome all visitors to our exhibits and events in Colton Hall, ” said Mayor Clyde Roberson ...“This is a perfect example of a Neighborhood Improvement Program project. '”

== California Constitution ==
California's military governor called for a constitutional convention to be held in Monterey's Colton Hall. The 48 delegates from ten districts met on the upper floor from September 1 to October 15, 1849, to debate and write California's first state constitution. The stairway leading to the convention hall at the time was in the rear of the building. The California Constitution was ratified on October 13, voted on in November that year and sent to Congress in January 1850. San Jose was chosen as the seat for the first Legislature.

== Colton Hall School ==
Originally built to be a school for Monterey children, it became the district school office as well as a grade school in 1873. In 1897 the school moved to a bigger building nearby. The Monterey Weekly Herald reported in 1875, "Surely the children of Monterey cannot fail to imbibe knowledge within such a building, the very air of which is redolent with patriotism and learning".

== Current history ==
The most important public office building in Monterey County still in continuous use, Colton Hall has over the years housed Monterey's City Hall, a public school, the county court house, the sheriff's office, and Monterey's city police headquarters. The second floor is a museum which was established in 1949. According to the museum's website it is open for free daily from 10-4pm, Thursdays-Sundays. A docent is on staff during these hours for information and tours. The second floor assembly hall has been restored to appear as it did when the 48 delegates of the first Constitution Convention met there.

Reenactment of 1849 delegates in Colton Hall part 1 - Courtesy Colton Hall Museum

Reenactment of 1849 delegates in Colton Hall part 2 - Courtesy Colton Hall Museum

Reenactment of 1849 delegates in Colton Hall part 3 - Courtesy Colton Hall Museum

== Interior ==
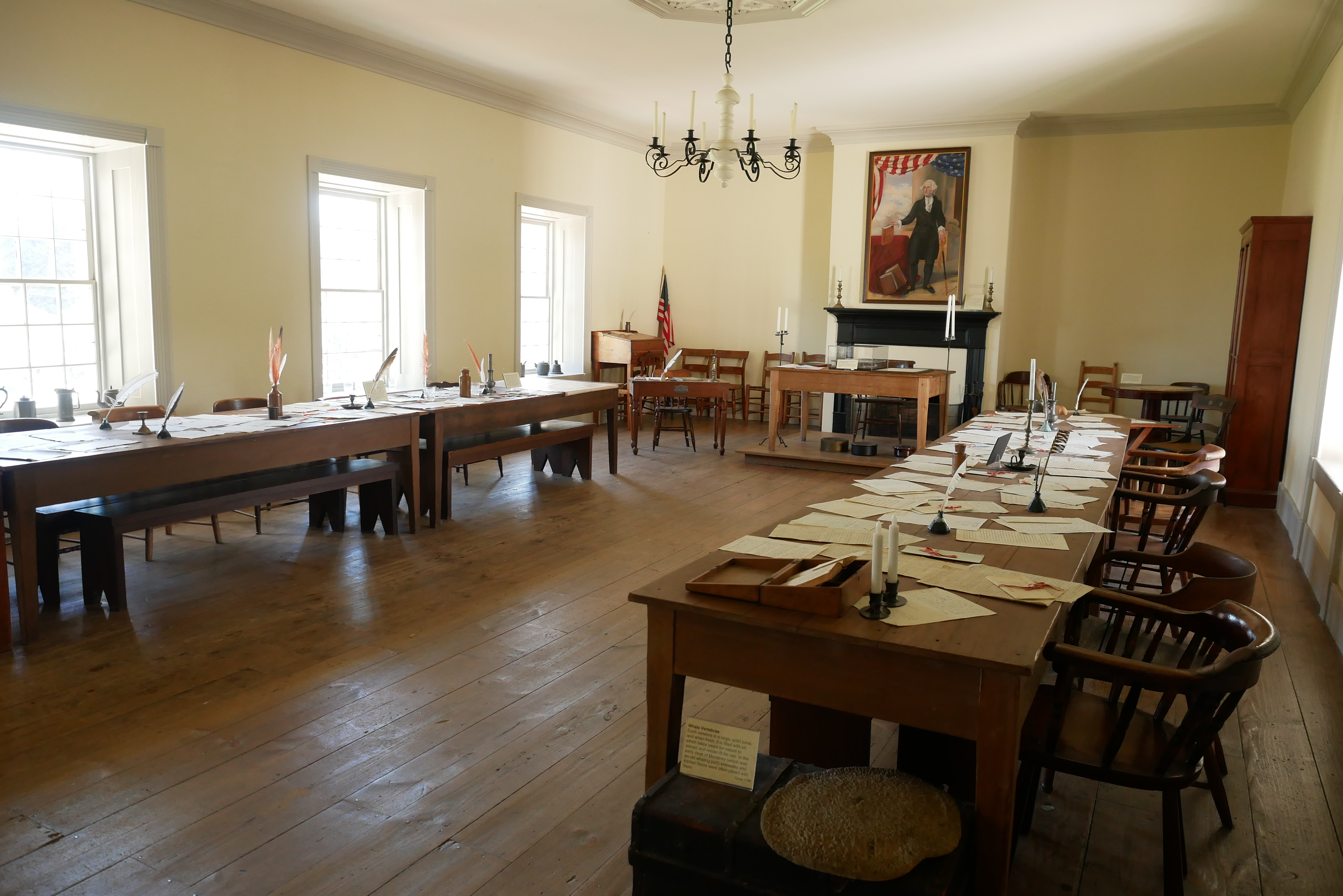
This is the inside room where the discussions and signing happened

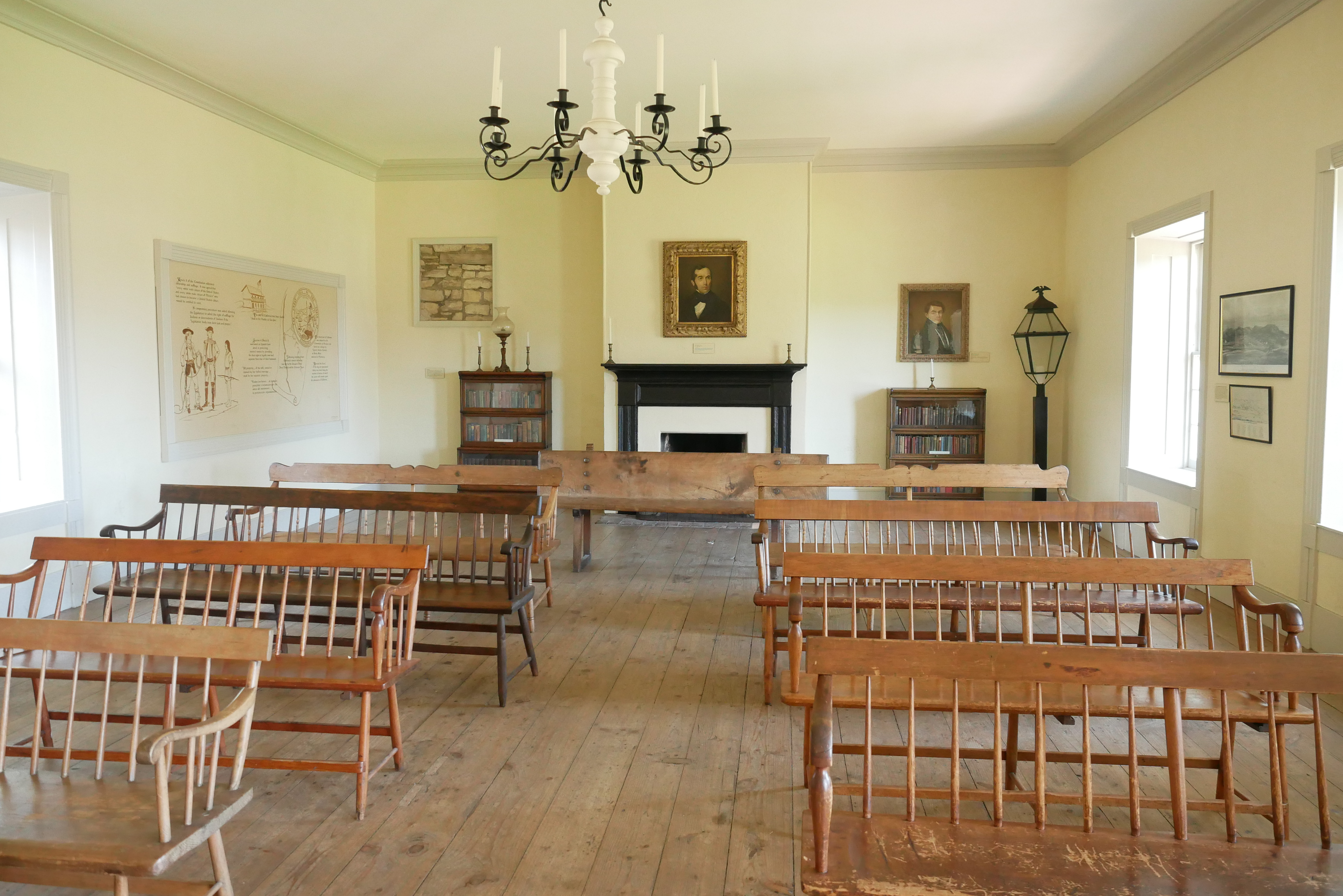
Colton Hall seating area with fireplace

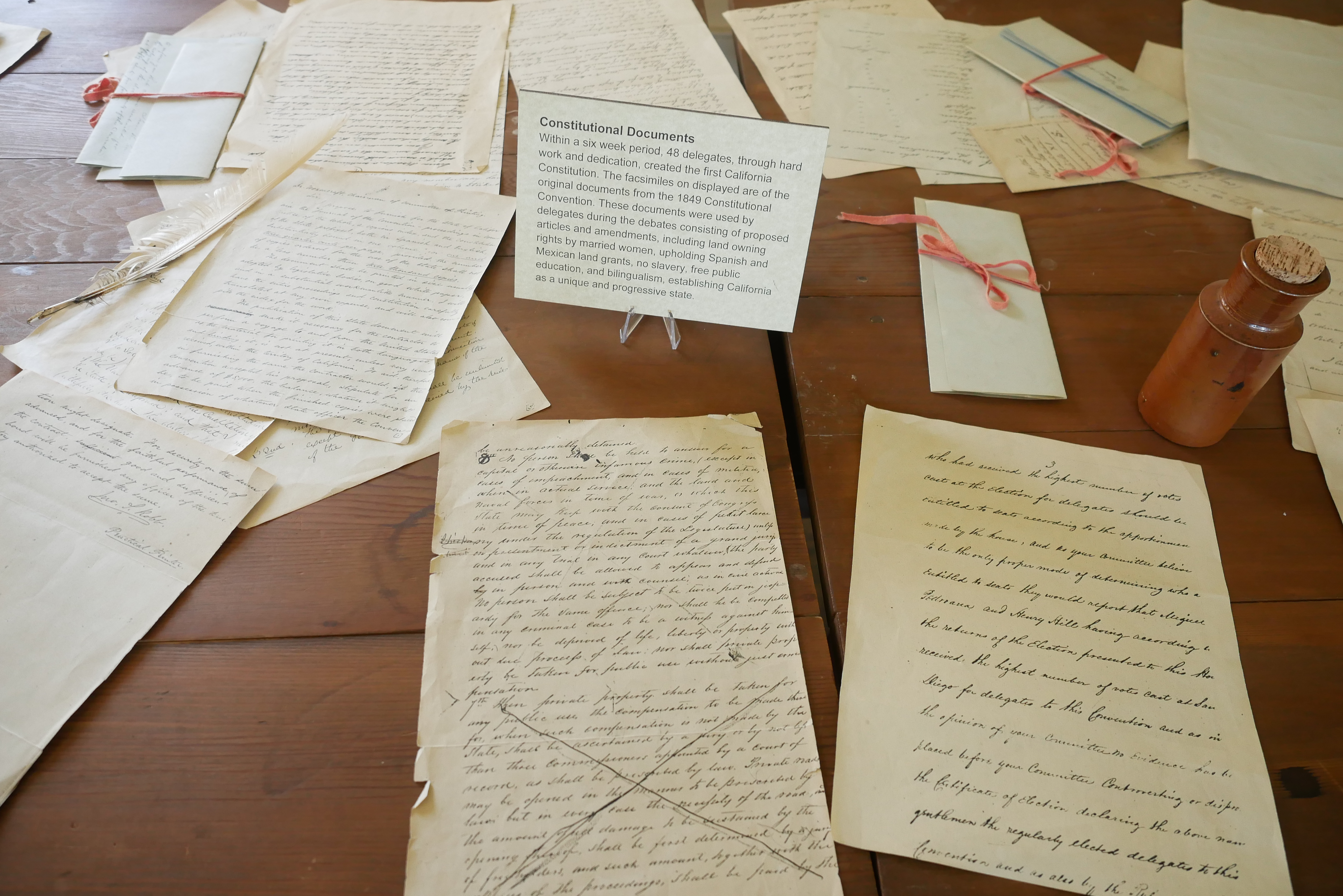
Papers representing notes and letters that would have been used during discussions

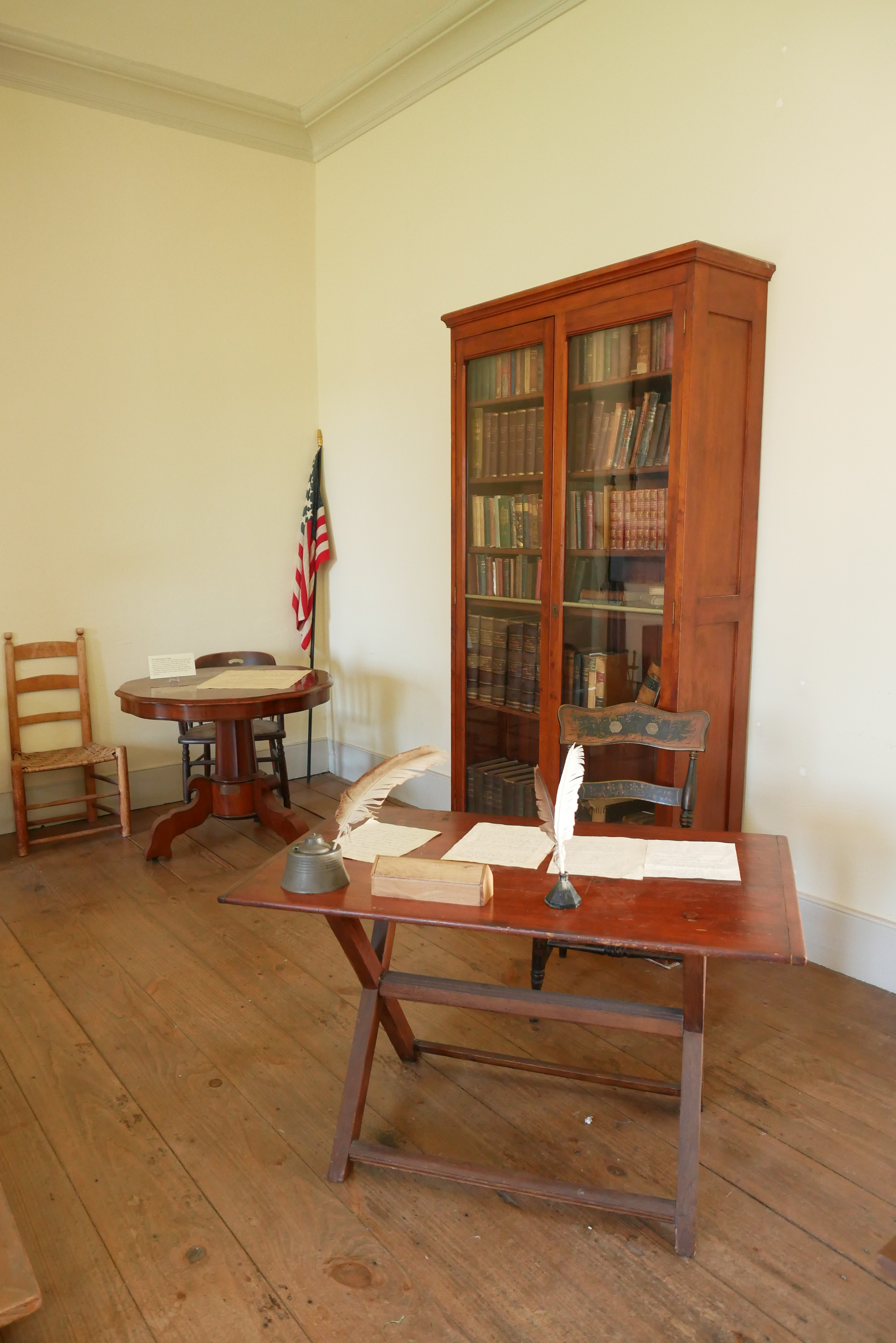

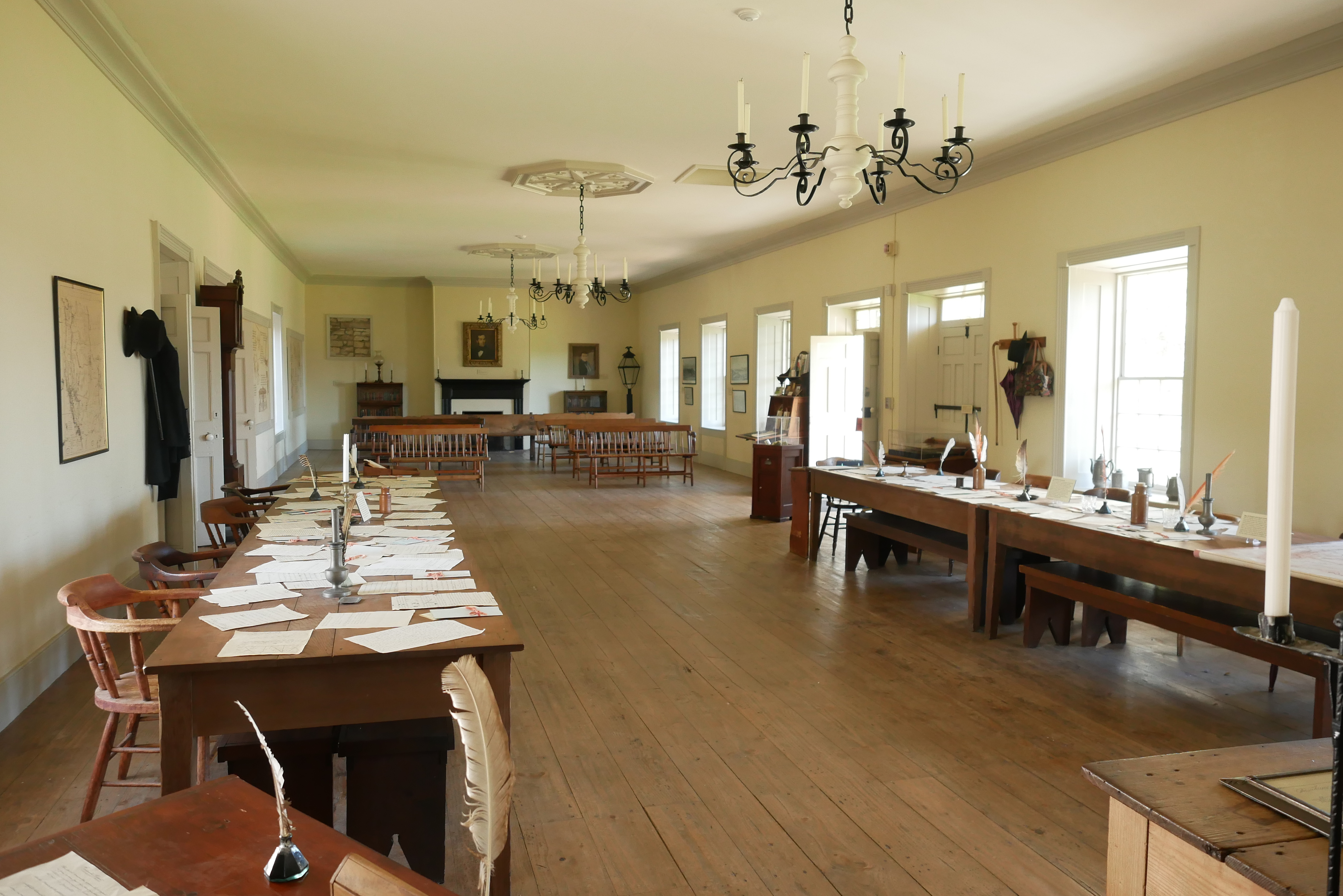
Long view of room

== Exterior ==
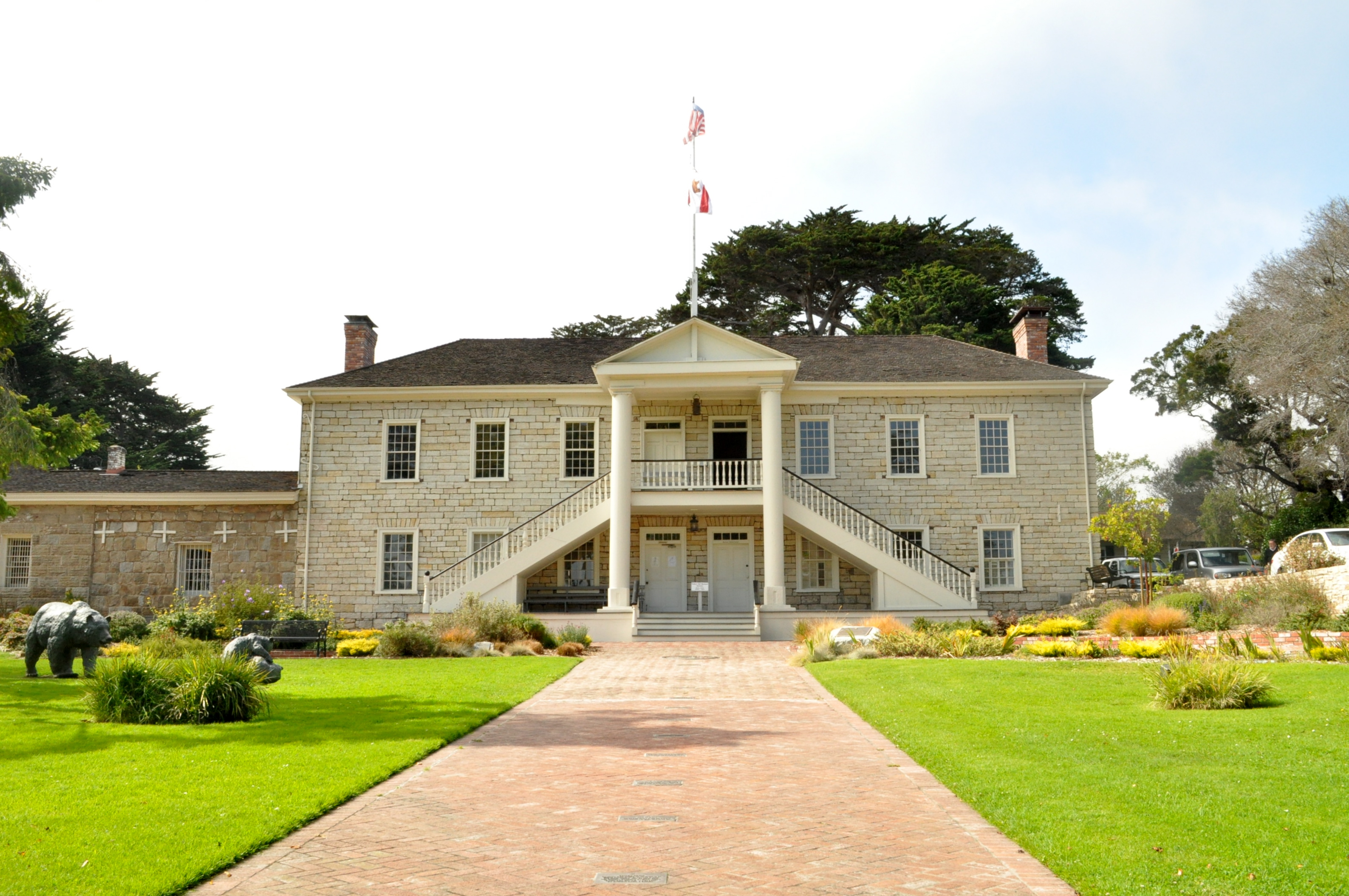

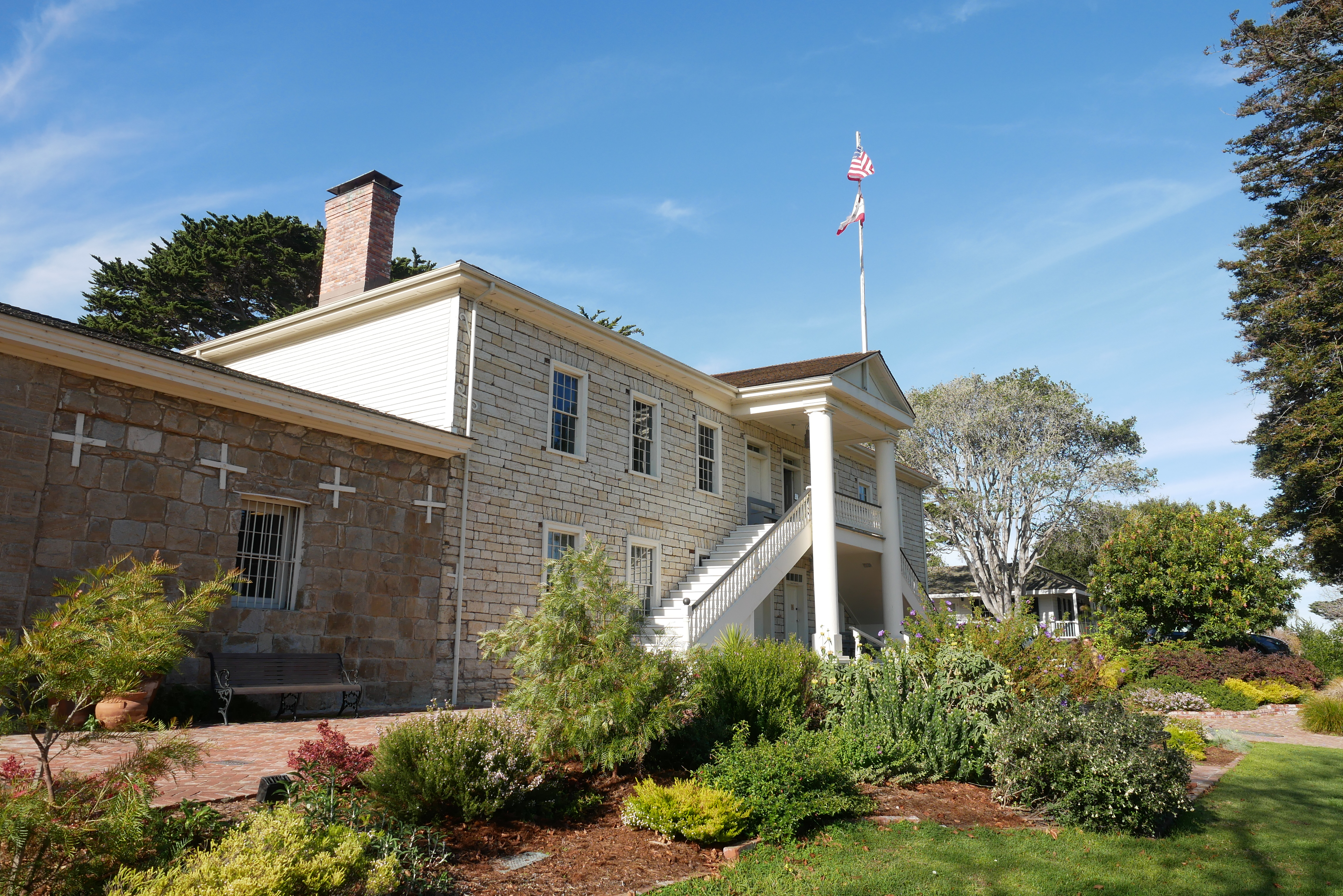

== See also ==
- Former California State Capitol sites
- California Historical Landmarks in Monterey County
- Monterey State Historic Park
- List of the oldest buildings in California
