= First Theater =

Historic site in California

- First theater in California
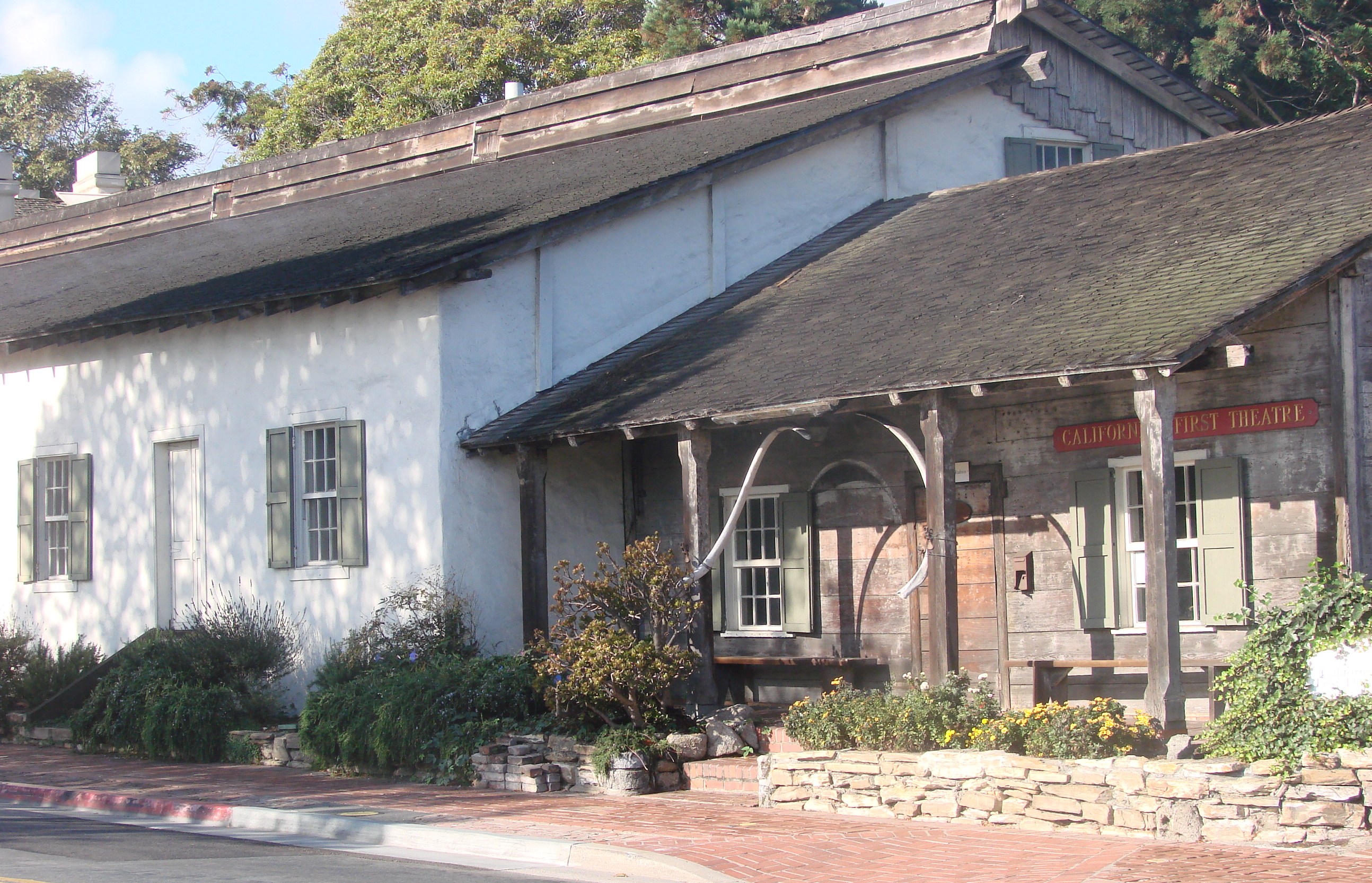
- California's First Theater

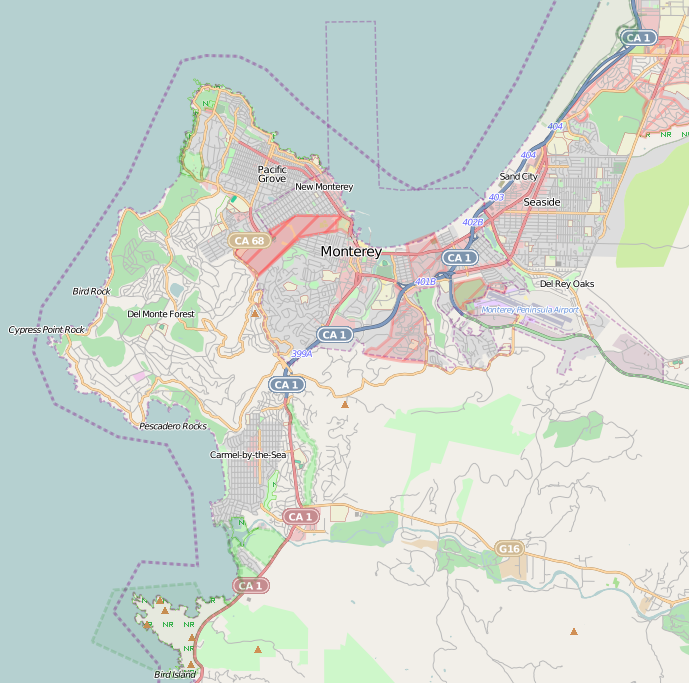
- Location in the Monterey Peninsula
- 36°36′10.7″N 121°53′44.07″W
- Location: Pacific Street, Monterey, California

History
- Built: 1845-47
- Built for: Jack Swan
- Original use: Saloon

Site notes
- Architectural styles: Adobe and wood
- Restored: 1920
- Current use: Performing arts venue
- Owner: State of California
- Website: ohp.parks.ca.gov/ListedResources/Detail/136

California Historical Landmark
- Reference no.: 136

The First Theater also known as the First theater in California, is a historic adobe and wood building in Monterey, California, United States. It was built in 1846–1847 as a lodging house and tavern for sailors, by English seaman and pioneer Jack Swan. Swan's Saloon staged the inaugural theatrical presentations in California. On January 31, 1934, the building was officially designated a California Historical Landmark #136.

== History ==
=== Saloon ===
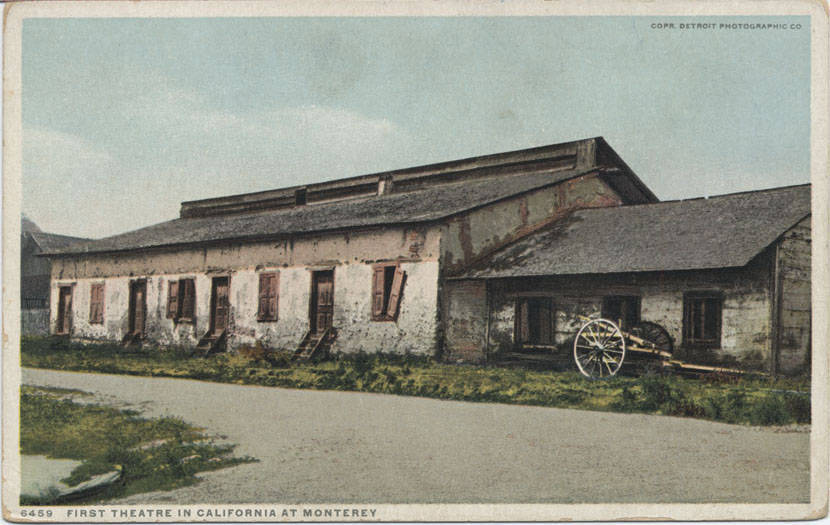
Postcard of the First Theatre in California.

The First Theater was built by English mariner Jack Swan (see below) during 1845–47, when he purchased a plot of land on the old Calle Estrada, now the southwest corner of Pacific and Scott Streets, near the Custom House. This was before the American occupation in July 1846. The building was developed in two stages: the smaller wooden portion was erected around 1845, using lumber salvaged from a shipwreck, serving initially as both a boarding house and a tavern catering to traveling sailors coming to shore from Monterey Bay. There were four sets of two-room units, each equipped with exterior doors on the east and west sides, as well as a fireplace in the rear room. These units were divided by partitions that could be raised or lowered.

Subsequently, this establishment, along with other saloons, was closed down under the directive of Rev. Walter Colton, the American Alcalde of Monterey.

=== Theater ===
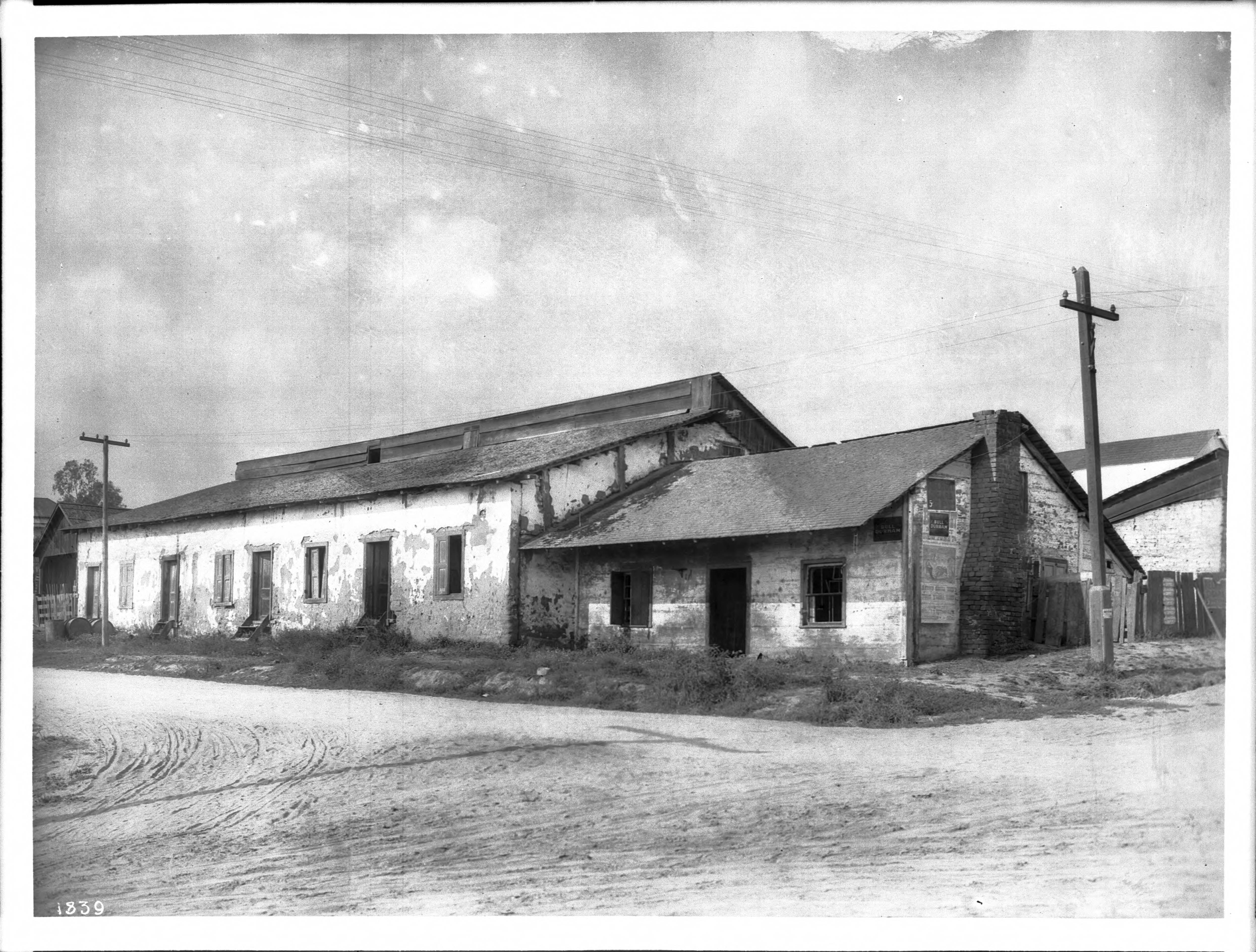
First Theater, Monterey, California, ca. 1900.

The larger rectangular adobe building was added, by Swan, in the autumn of 1847 to function as a boarding house for sailors but was converted into a theater. This change occurred when four soldiers from Santa Barbara organized a minstrel show, collaborating with three resident comedians from the local community. Stretching to 75 ft (23 m) in length and 12 ft (3.7 m) feet in width, this space could comfortably accommodate two hundred people. It featured a pit and a stage as well. A curtain made of wood, suspended on hinges, functioned as a partition that could be raised and lowered. The programs for the entertainments were handwritten, while the bills and posters were produced using a blacking pot and brush for printing.

By 1848, the United States Army officers stationed in the Presidio of Monterey, California, including Colonel Jonathan D. Stevenson's 1st Regiment of New York Volunteers and Lieutenant Alfred Sully, were looking for a place to put on plays and comedies. They organized theatrical productions under the guidance of Actor/Manager Charles E. Bingham. Rebranded as "The Union Theatre for the production of Melodramas," Swan fitted the establishment with a modest stage, benches for seating, whale-oil lamps, footlight candles, and makeshift curtains for the shows, priced at $5 (equivalent to $194 in 2025) per ticket. The venture garnered $500 (equivalent to $19,350 in 2025) during its inaugural show.

The troupe members delivered California's first paid performance, presenting Putnam, the Iron Son of '76 thereby officially designating Swan's adobe as the "First Theater in California." Between 1848 and 1850, a span of twenty-one months saw the production of various plays, including Box and Cox, Damon and Pythias, and the balcony scene from Romeo and Juliet.

From 1850 to 1896, Swan leased out his adobe and embarked on a pursuit of gold in the Sierra Nevada, prospecting along the American River. Over the subsequent 46 years, the adobe building served various roles, functioning as a lodging house, whaling station (with the addition of a lookout tower in the 1850s), a drug store during the 1870s, gift shop, and ultimately transitioning into a tea room and shop.

The smaller structure was inhabited by Fred Smith (1881-1919), who operated a curio shop within its walls for approximately twenty years. The larger adobe building remained vacant, gradually succumbing to deterioration following Swan's death in 1896.

=== California Historical Landmark ===
In 1905, the California Historic Landmarks League, a consortium of Monterey residents (including William Randolph Hearst), acquired the building, subsequently donating it to the State of California in 1906. The state legislature allocated funds for its complete restoration and by 1920, the restoration efforts had concluded, leading to the reopening of the long rectangular adobe as a museum. On display in the museum were articles, including some that were over two hundred and fifty years old. An additional room was used as a tea-serving area.

On January 31, 1934, the State Department of Parks and Recreation & City of Monterey declared the building a California Historical Landmark #136.

On June 3, 1937, the theater resumed its activities under the stewardship of Denny-Watrous Management from Carmel-by-the-Sea, California. They embraced the challenge and chose an 1880s melodrama titled Tatters, the Pet of Squatter's Gulch, which became the first performance within the historic adobe after a hiatus of more than 75 years.

On September 3, 1937, Denny-Watrous Management obtained a lease for the building, sponsored by the Monterey History and Art Association, with the purpose of hosting theatrical performances, which marked the commencement of the Troupers of the Gold Coast's residency. They staged the melodrama, In the Shadow of the Rockies, which achieved tremendous success. From 1937 until 1999, the Troupers of the Gold Coast rejuvenated the theater's original melodramas, resurrecting performances from the 1850s. On May 31, 1947, marking its tenth anniversary, the following passage appeared in The Herald: "Being the sole 'legitimate' theater offering year-round weekend presentations of classic melodramas between San Francisco and Santa Barbara, its one-of-a-kind history and uproarious entertainment draw visitors from along the entire coastline."

As of 1965, presentations were still taking place at California's inaugural theater. The Troupers of the Gold Coast maintained the tradition for over 50 years, closing for renovation in 1999.

The Monterey State Historic Park Association (MSHPA) is currently actively engaged in extensive repair efforts. In the near future, the building is set to welcome both special events and the public, specifically for the "Christmas in the Adobes" festivities. On August 31, 2024, a public event was held to celebrate the reopening of the theater.

== Legacy ==
The Online Archive of California contains the collection known as the Guide to the California First Theater Collection. The collection titled California First Theater Collection encompasses a range of documents, artifacts, and mementos associated with California's oldest theater venue. Most of the materials pertain to the theater's final significant era of operation spanning from 1937 to 1999. Furthermore, the collection holds substantial records capturing the essence of modern theatrical performances in San Francisco, Chicago, and New York City.

== See also ==
- California Historical Landmarks in Monterey County
