= Monterey State Historic Park =

State park in California, United States

- Interactive map of Monterey State Historic Park
- Location: Monterey, California, United States
- Coordinates: 36.6000°N 121.8947°W
- Established: 1916
- Governing body: California State Parks
- Interactive map of the Monterey Old Town Historic District.

Monterey State Historic Park is a historic state park in Monterey, California. It includes part of the Monterey Old Town Historic District, a historic district that includes 17 contributing buildings and was declared a National Historic Landmark in 1970. Other areas of the park lie outside of the historic district. The grounds include California's first theatre, and the Monterey Custom House, where the American flag was first raised over California.

The park is a group of restored historic buildings. The exhibited houses display the cultural diversity that guided California's transition from a remote Spanish outpost in Las Californias province, to an agricultural Mexican Alta California territory, to U.S. statehood. These influential adobe houses made up California's earliest capital and were the site of the state's first constitutional convention.

Today the historic buildings retain their rich heritage, preserving an important part of Californian as well as Spanish, Mexican, and American history. Added to the adobe houses is the park's Interpretive Center and the Pacific House Museum.

== The park ==
=== Custom House ===
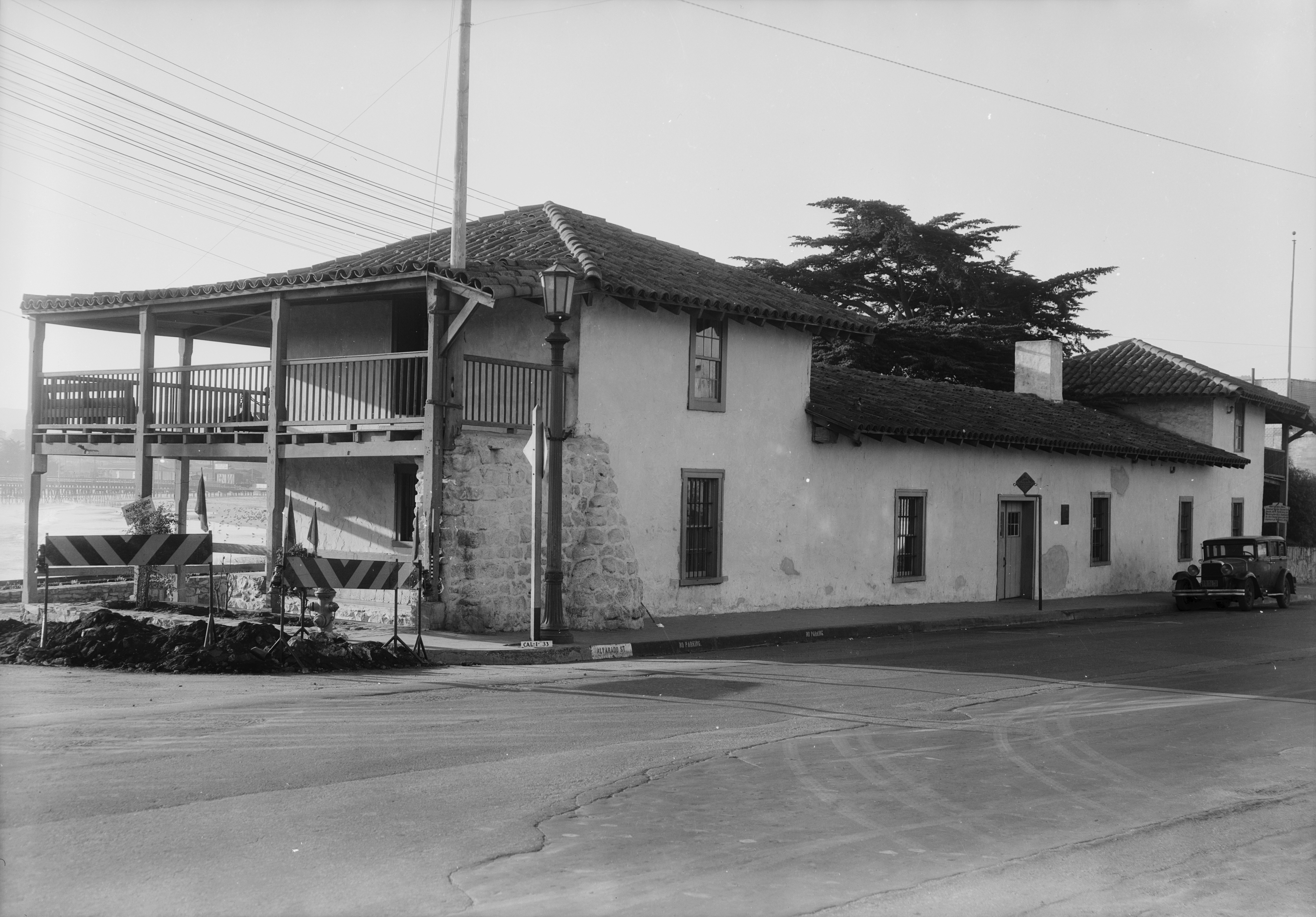
Custom House, 1936

The Custom House, built around 1821 by the Mexican government, is California's first historic landmark and its oldest public building. It is where the first American Flag was raised on July 7, 1846, declaring California part of the United States. It is a National Historic Landmark (#66000217). It is also a California Historical Landmark (#1).

=== Cooper-Molera Adobe ===
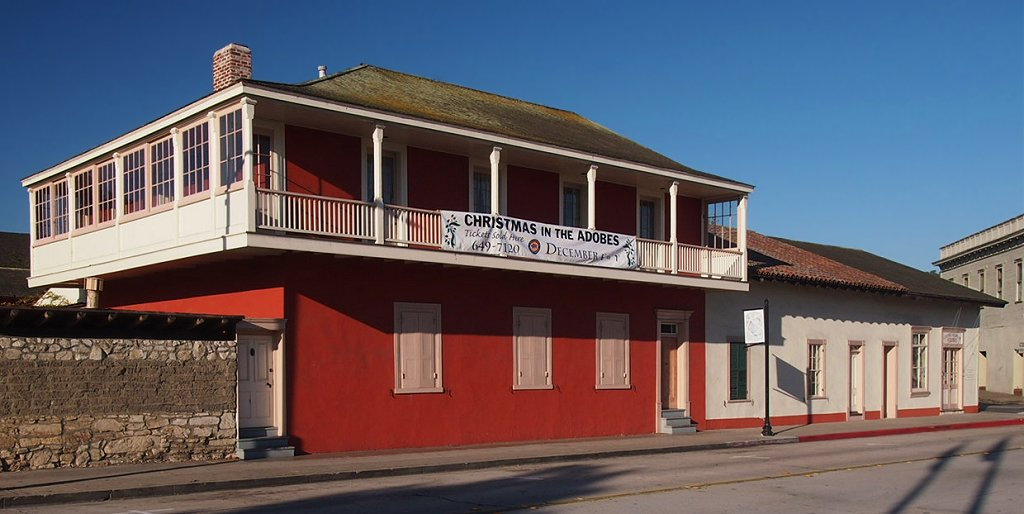
Cooper-Molera Adobe

The Cooper-Molera is no longer a part of the Monterey State Historic Park. The property is owned and managed by the National Trust for Historic Preservation.

The Cooper-Molera Adobe was built by John Bautista Rogers Cooper, a sea captain and trader, in 1827. He became a merchant and a prominent landowner in Monterey. Cooper's daughter Amelia married Eusebio Joseph Molera in 1875. The adobe house is a leading example of Spanish building style combined with New England architecture.

The Cooper-Molera Adobe was featured in Bob Vila's A&E Network production Guide to Historic Homes of America. In 2015, the exhibits and collections were reassessed in order to better illuminate the lives of the family who lived there. Through the historical collections inventory, the Cooper-Molera Adobe's holdings were identified and grouped in various categories. This process illuminated two activities that were of particular interest to the family: animal husbandry and farming (specifically artichoke growing).

=== Larkin House ===
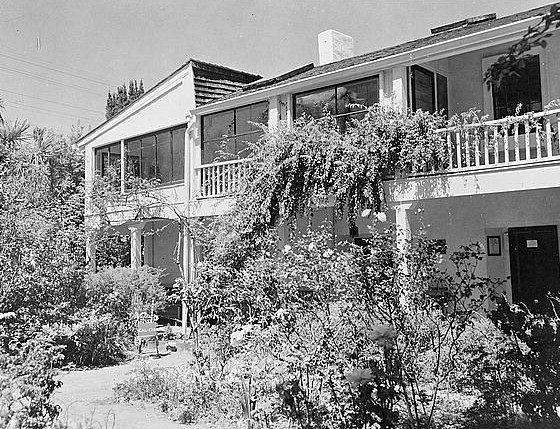
Larkin House, 1959

The Larkin House, itself designated a National Historic Landmark, combined Spanish building methods with New England architectural features. This created a pattern for the popular "Monterey Colonial" style of architecture. This building is a California Historical Landmark (#106).

=== First Brick House ===
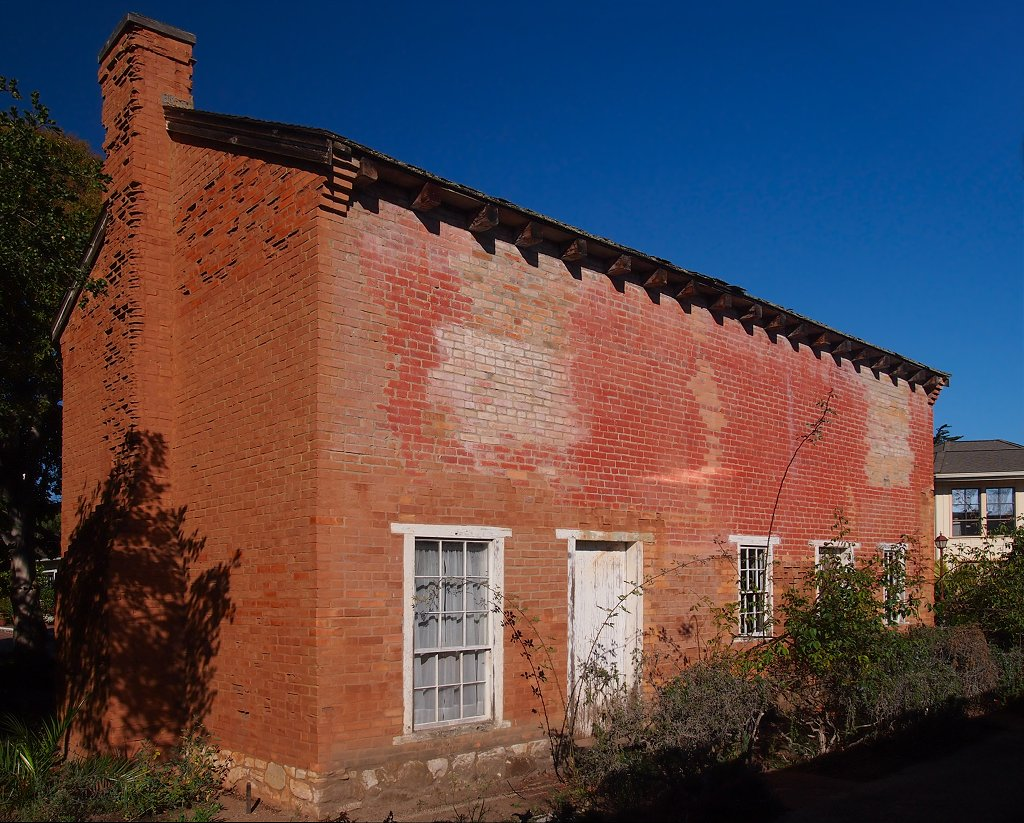
California's first brick house

California's first brick house was built in 1847 by Gallant Dickenson. He was the first person to introduce American building techniques to Monterey's architectural mix. Previously, Spanish and Mexican construction relied on unfired adobe blocks, which required extremely thick walls to support upper stories and plaster coatings to repel water. In contrast brick could make walls that were much thinner yet far more durable. Dickinson planned to make the house bigger, but left for the California gold fields with only the extant structure completed. It later housed a restaurant.

=== Old Whaling Station ===
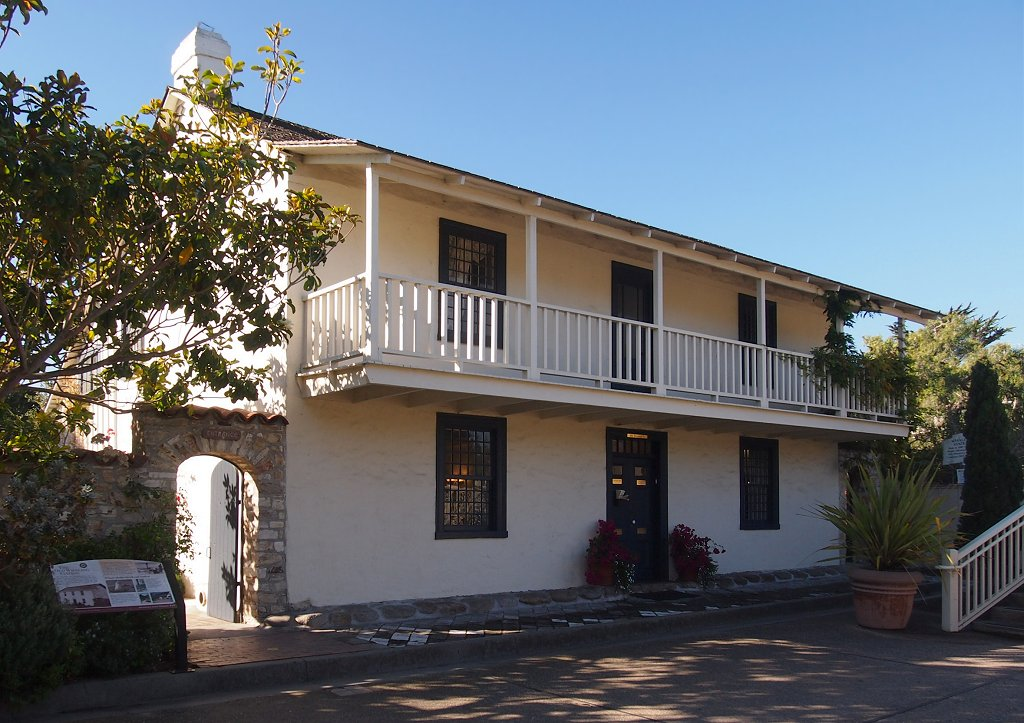
Old Whaling Station

The Old Whaling Station was built as a private home in 1847, but in 1855 became the headquarters and employee housing for the Old Monterey Whaling Company. This building was used to support the shore whaling operations. The unique feature of this establishment is the front walkway, which is made up of whale vertebrae, one of several buildings in the area that prominently feature whalebone. The Old Whaling Station is a reminder of the economic activity in California's history.

=== First Theater ===
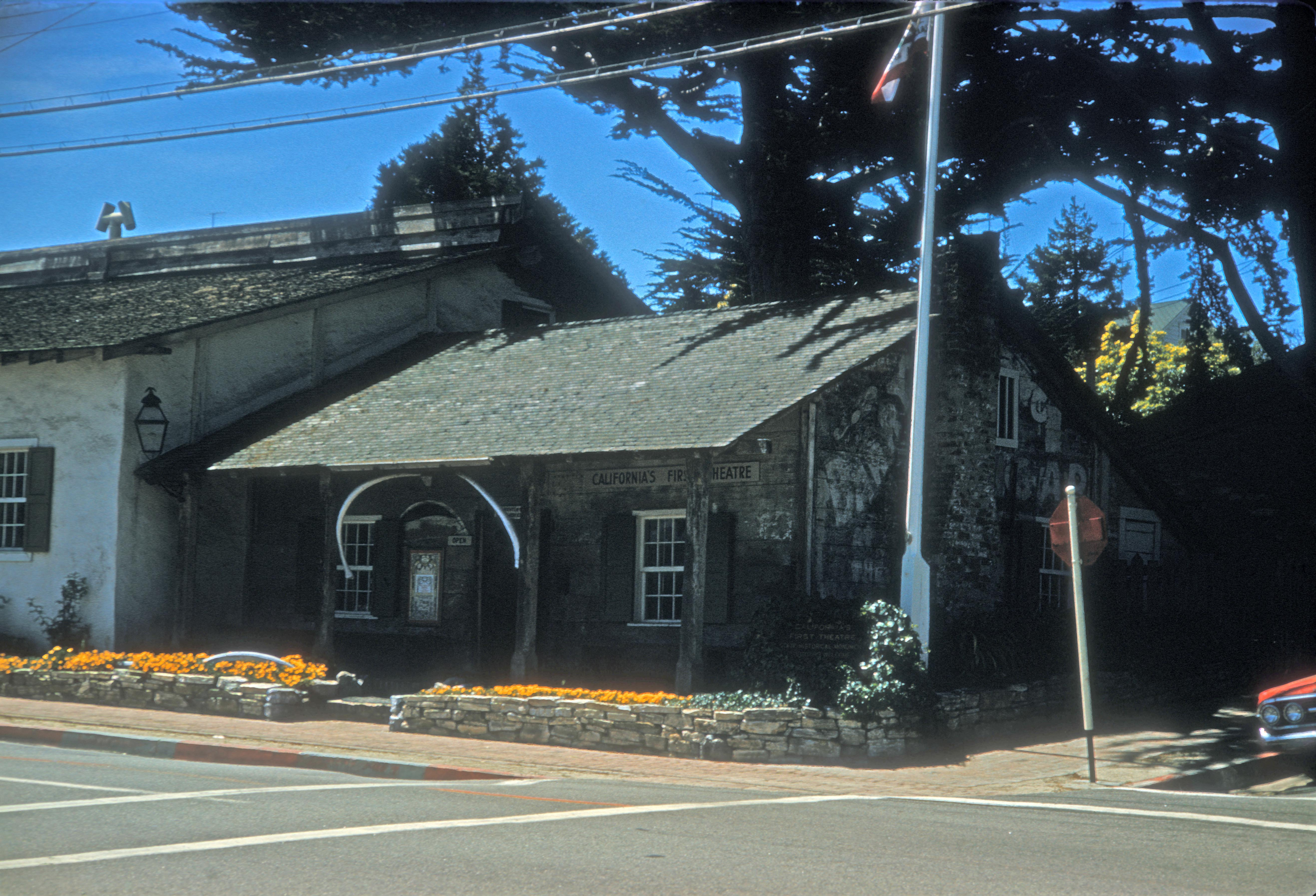
California's First Theater

This adobe, California's First Theater, was built by English seaman Jack Swan in 1846–47 as a lodging house and tavern for sailors. He built the wood portion of the building in about 1845. He added the adobe portion in 1847, as the actual theater. It was used as a theatre in 1850 when U.S. Army officers stationed in Monterey, e.g. Lt. Alfred Sully and others, produced plays under the direction of actor/manager Charles Bingham, and named it "The Union Theatre for the Production of Melodramas". Swan built a small stage and provided benches, whale-oil lamps, candles for footlights and blankets as curtains. In later years, the First Theater was used as a lodging house for whalers, but fell into disrepair after Swan's death in 1896.

It was purchased in 1906 by the California Historic Landmarks League and donated to the State of California. In 1937 and until recently, the Troupers of the Gold Coast staged the first melodramas since the 1850s. Because of structural issues, the building is closed to the public except for the Christmas in the Adobes event in December. This building is a California Historical Landmark (#136).

=== Stevenson House ===
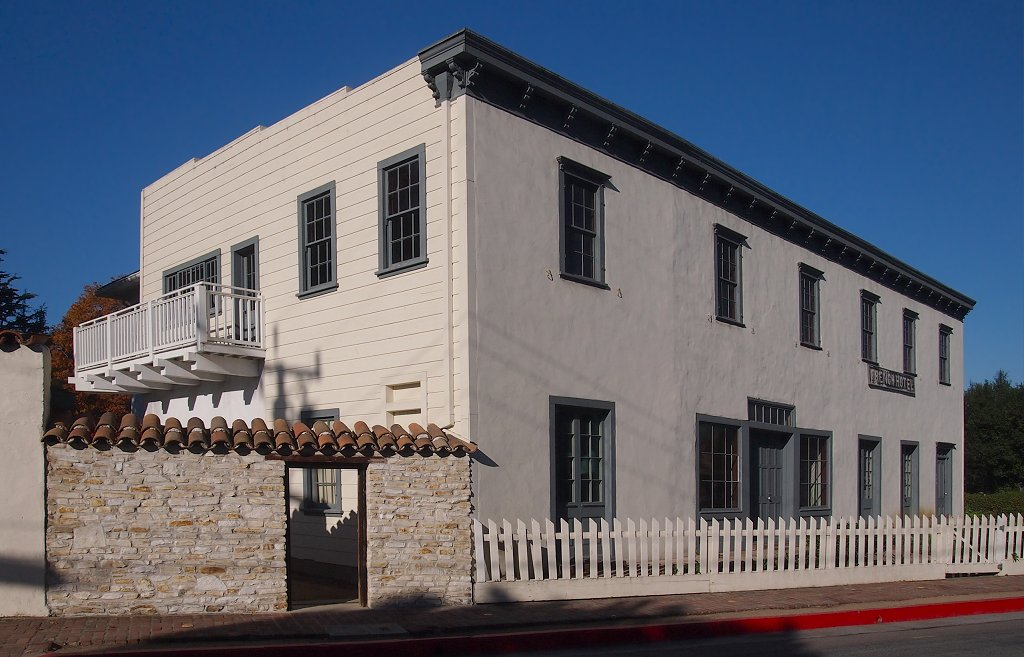
Stevenson House

In 1879, Scottish novelist Robert Louis Stevenson stayed at the French Hotel at 530 Houston Street, now called the Stevenson House after him and dedicated to his memory. Stevenson lived there while recovering his health as he was crossing the United States to court his future wife Fanny Osbourne. While there, he often dined "on the cuff" at a nearby restaurant run by Frenchman Jules Simoneau which stood at what is now Simoneau Plaza. Several years later, Stevenson sent Simoneau an inscribed copy of his novel Strange Case of Dr Jekyll and Mr Hyde (1886), writing that it would be a stranger case still if Robert Louis Stevenson ever forgot Jules Simoneau. Stevenson wrote some articles for the local Monterey newspaper, including one that evoked "the Old Pacific Capital."

The Stevenson House features a bas relief depicting the sickly author writing in bed, and is California Historical Landmark #352.

=== Pacific House Museum ===
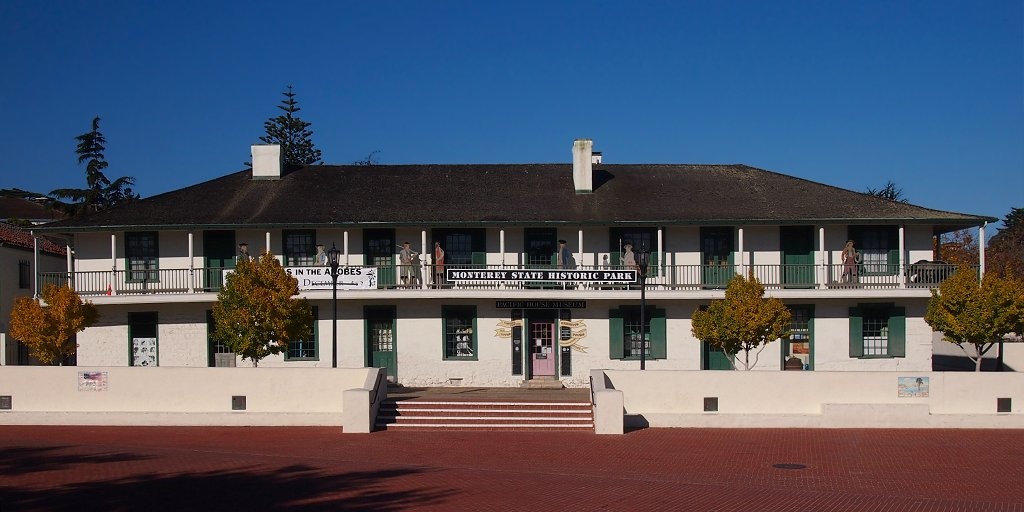
Pacific House

The Pacific House was constructed in 1847 during the U.S. occupation of California. This adobe was used by the U.S. Army as storage, a hotel, a court house, a tavern, and in later years as offices. The gardens outside were used for bullfights and bear fights. The Pacific House Museum tells the story of Monterey when it was the capital of Spanish and Mexican California, and also contains the Monterey Museum of the American Indian. This building is a California Historical Landmark (#354).

=== Casa Soberanes ===
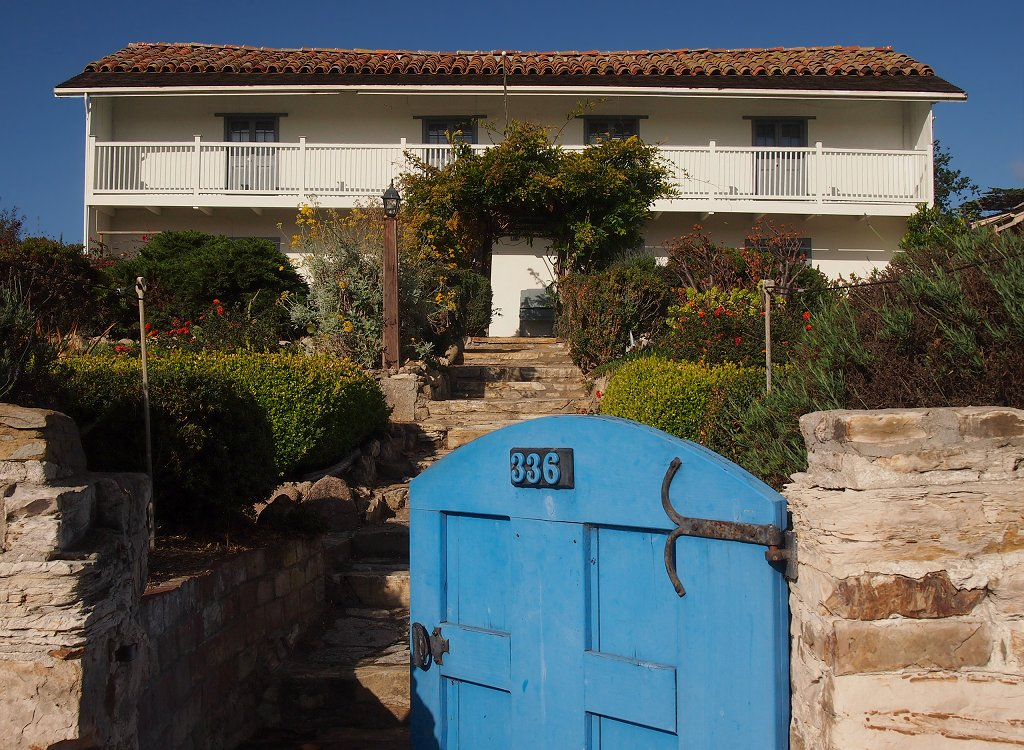
Casa Soberanes

Rafael Estrada constructed the Casa Soberanes, an adobe brick home on a hillside overlooking the bay, during the 1840s. His family lived there until it was sold in 1860 to the Soberanes family, who lived there until 1922. The Serranos later purchased and restored the house in the 1920s and 1930s. The house contains furnishings that are a blend of early New England and China trade pieces mixed in with modern Mexican folk art. Casa Soberanes received its nickname—The House of the Blue Gate—from the blue gate at its garden entrance on Pacific Street. Wine bottles, whale bones, and abalone shells border paths meandering through the sheltered garden. This building is a California Historical Landmark (#712).

=== Casa del Oro ===
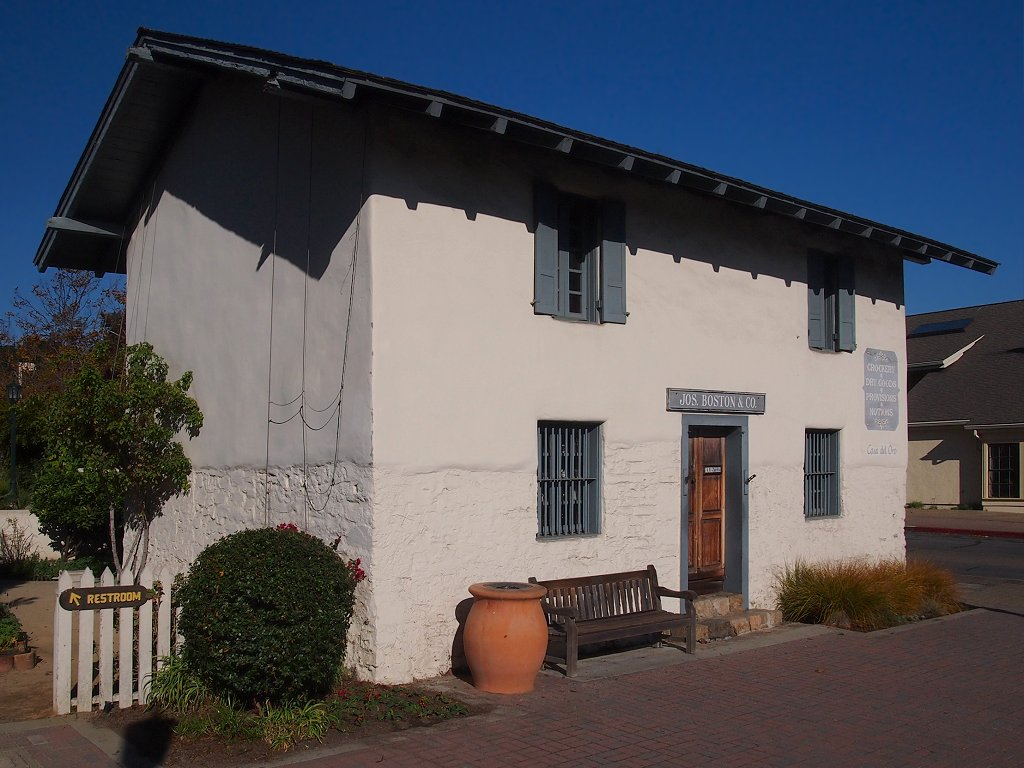
Casa del Oro

The Casa del Oro—or "House of Gold" in Spanish—is in the Custom House Plaza. Built in 1849 as an army barracks, then as a hospital for sailors run by Thomas Larkin. Later the building was used as general store run by Joseph Boston in the 1850s. The origin of the name could be attributed to a period of time when the building was used as a saloon and later as a gold dust exchange for miners. This building is a California Historical Landmark (#532).

=== Sherman Quarters ===
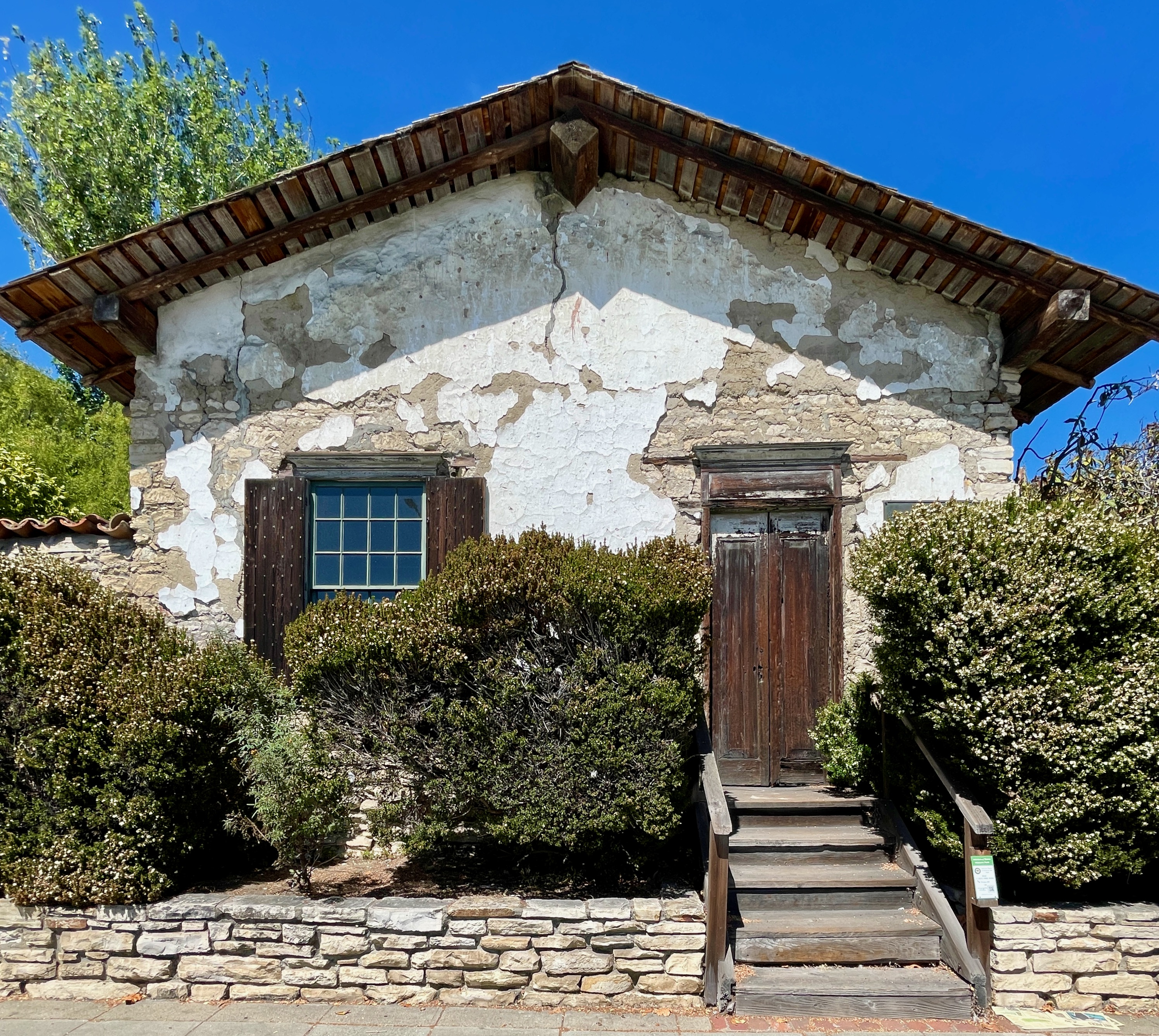
Sherman Quarters

The Sherman Quarters were built in 1834 by Thomas Larkin. This small stone building was the quarters for Lieutenant William Tecumseh Sherman in 1847. Sherman later became famous as a Union general during the American Civil War. Later the artist Percy Gray, a California Impressionist, lived there with his new wife from 1923 to 1939.

== See also ==
- National Register of Historic Places listings in Monterey County, California
- List of the oldest buildings in the United States
