= Jack Swan =

American pioneer

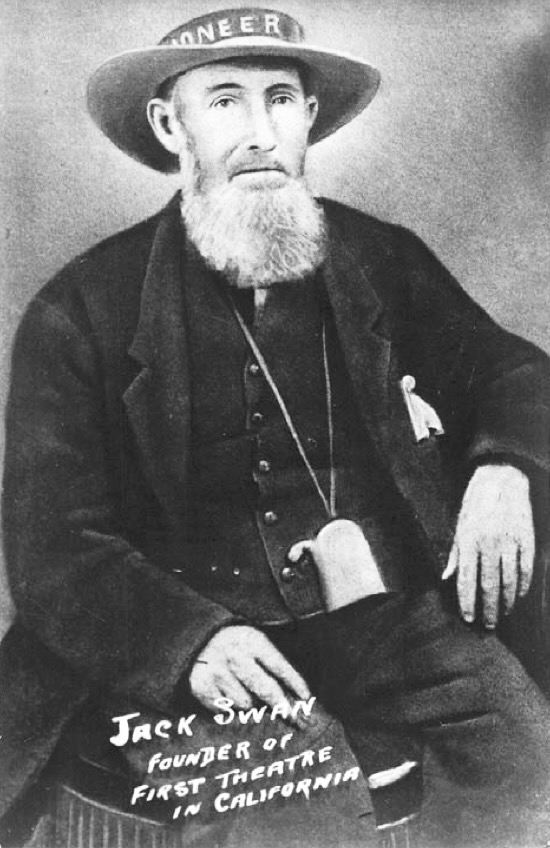
- Jack Swan (1817-1896), his hat band displayed the inscription, "Pioneer of 1843."
- Born: John Alfred Swan; November 22, 1817; London, England
- Died: 6 January 1896 (aged 78); Monterey, California, US
- Occupations: California pioneer, builder

John Alfred "Jack" Swan (November 22, 1817 – January 6, 1896), also known as Jack Swan, was a prominent California pioneer who arrived in Monterey in 1843. He is credited with founding the First theater in California, around 1845, and helping Commodore John Drake Sloat raise the American flag over the Custom House, declaring California as part of the United States during the American Conquest of California.

== Early life ==
Swan was born on November 22, 1817, in London, England. He was the tenth child among eleven siblings. His parents, hailing from Scotland, joined in matrimony in Edinburgh before eventually relocating to London shortly after the birth of their first son.

== Professional life ==
=== Travels ===
When he reached the age of 10, Swan, along with two elder brothers, commenced employment aboard a vessel belonging to their merchant uncle. Following the uncle's business collapse, Swan journeyed back to his parents in London, where he pursued an apprenticeship in 1832 aboard the schooner Barkley. By the time he turned 14, he embarked on a voyage, traversing the Mediterranean and seeing the Old World.

After his return to London, he parted ways with the schooner Barkley and enlisted as a crew member aboard the Marquis. This vessel carried him on a voyage from London to Bombay. Subsequently, he joined the crew of the Cornwallis, navigating to Nei Lingding Island, China, and reaching this destination in April 1837. He spent several months on the Agnes, under the command of his elder brother Robert, before assuming the role of second mate on the Harriet. Engaging in the opium trade for a span of two years, he continued in this capacity until October 1839. His next endeavor led him to the Harlequin, which conveyed him to Mazatlán, Mexico in July 1840. Embarking on an overland journey to the Gulf of Mexico, he set sail to New Orleans, ultimately arriving shortly before Christmas in 1840.

During May 1841, Swan embarked on a steamship voyage up the Mississippi and Ohio rivers, eventually arriving in Cincinnati. Proceeding on foot to Cleveland, he dedicated the remainder of that year to service aboard schooners navigating the Great Lakes. Arriving at Ogdensburg, New Jersey on the St. Lawrence Seaway in December, he then embarked on a stagecoach journey to Albany and continued his journey by sailing down the Hudson River, he ventured to New York City, where he became a part of the Lucy Ann's crew. This maritime assignment facilitated his return voyage to New Orleans. In that location, Swan became a member of the Dumfriesshire's crew, guiding a shipment of cotton to Liverpool in the early days of April 1842. At the age of 24, Swan had effectively journeyed across the globe through his own labor. Most of the year of 1842 was spent in England, where he reunited with family, bid his final farewell to his mother, and then embarked for Valparaíso, Chile in February 1843.

Navigating the Strait of Magellan, Swan arrived at Valparaíso in February 1843. From there, he continued his journey, boarding a steamer that brought him to Callao, Peru, by March. Following a month of traversing Peru on foot, he secured passage on a schooner to San Blas, Mexico, and eventually reached Mazatlán in May 1842. Progressing from there, he made his way to Monterey, California in the summer of 1843 aboard the vessel Soledad.

=== Monterey, California ===
Opting to settle in Monterey in 1843 at the age of 25, Swan's plans took a different turn when he struggled to secure employment on land. This led him to return to the maritime life on the ship Californian, captained by Monterey's own Juan B. R. Cooper. After participating in two voyages with Cooper, Swan made the decision to bid farewell to the sea on June 7, 1844. He would later express his pride in this decision, stating, "Since I established a store in Monterey in 1844, I've been solely a passenger when it comes to matters of the sea."

Within Monterey, Swan embarked on a new path, initiating his journey by becoming a baker, crafting Swan's pies that garnered the favor of Yankees en route to the Mexican capital of Alta California.

=== First Theater ===
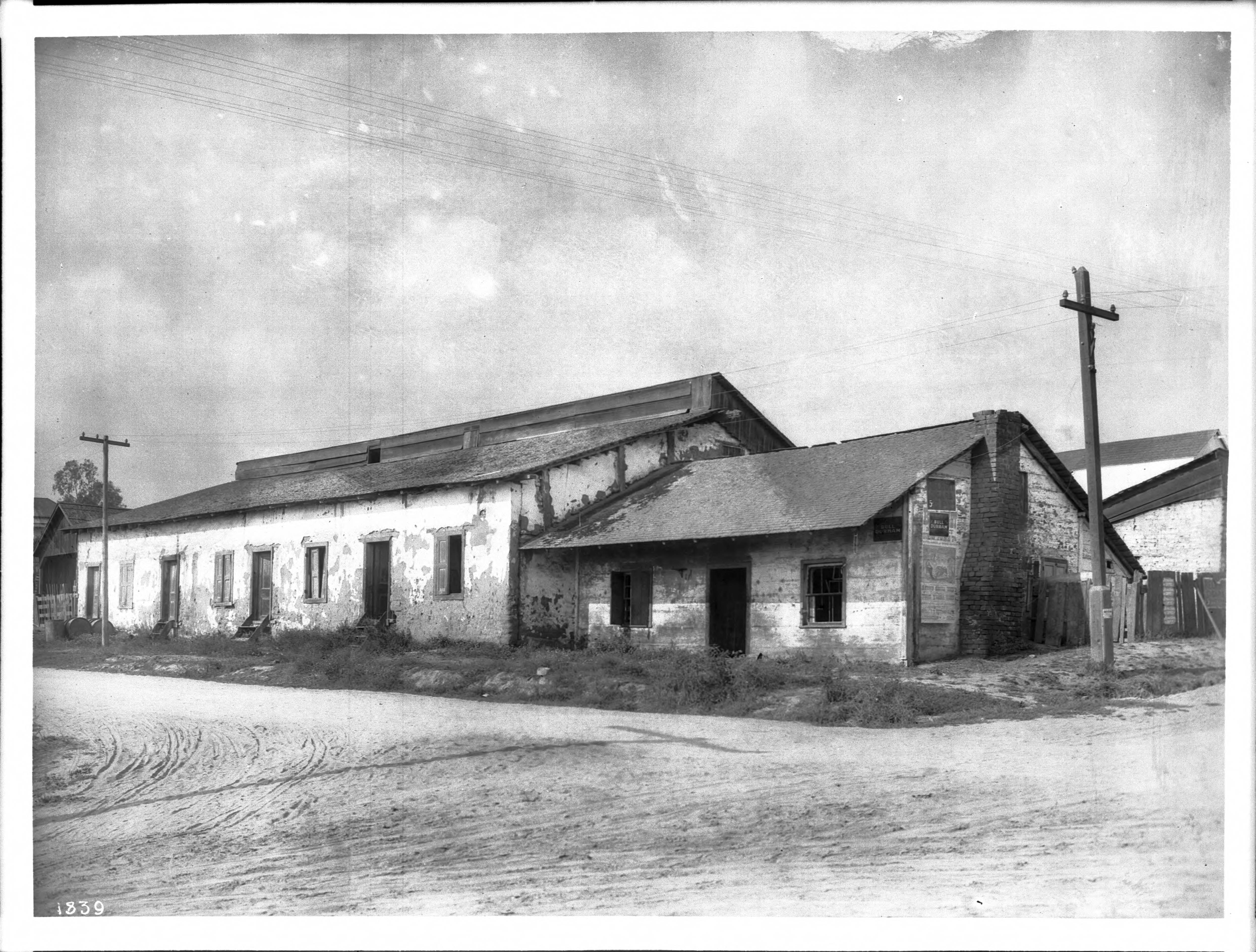
First Theater, Monterey, California, ca. 1900.

Swan purchased a plot of land on the old Calle Estrada, now the southwest corner of Pacific and Scott Streets, near the Custom House. This was before the American occupation in July 1846. The building was developed in two stages: the smaller wooden portion was erected around 1845, using lumber salvaged from a shipwreck, serving initially as both a boarding house and a tavern catering to traveling sailors coming to shore from Monterey Bay. There were four sets of two-room units, each equipped with exterior doors on the east and west sides, as well as a fireplace in the rear room. These units were divided by partitions that could be raised or lowered. The larger rectangular adobe building was added in 1847 to function as an actual theater.

On July 7, 1846, during the Mexican–American War, Swan helped U.S. Commodore John Drake Sloat raise the American flag, over the Custom House at Monterey, declaring California part of the United States during the American Conquest of California.

In 1848, the structure underwent a transformation into a theater due to the presence of United States Army officers stationed in Monterey. Among them were officers from Colonel Jonathan D. Stevenson's 1st Regiment of New York Volunteers, who were based at the Presidio of Monterey, California. Seeking a venue for staging plays and comedies, they influenced Swan to convert the saloon into a theater. Rebranded as "The Union Theatre for the production of Melodramas," Swan fitted the establishment with a modest stage, benches for seating, whale-oil lamps, footlight candles, and makeshift blanket curtains for the shows, priced at $5 (equivalent to $194 in 2025) per ticket. The venture garnered $500 (equivalent to $19,350 in 2025) during its inaugural show, a substantial amount for that era.

=== California Gold Rush ===
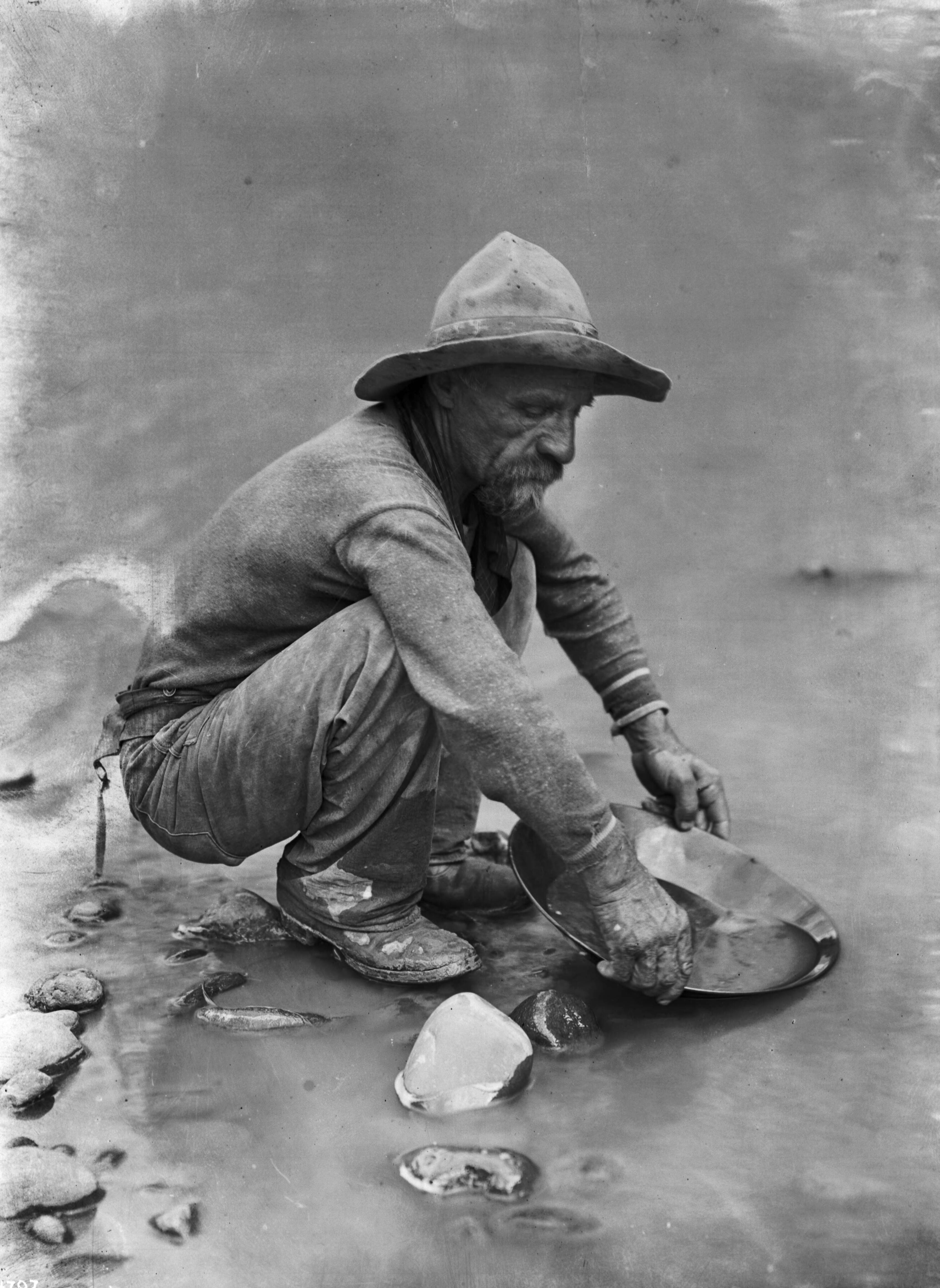
Panning for gold during the California Gold Rush.

Following the 1849 California Gold Rush, a significant portion of the population, Swan included, journeyed to northern California with hopes of striking it rich. From 1850 to 1896, Swan leased out his theater and went to the Sierra Nevada, prospecting along the American River. Records also indicate his involvement in overseeing a mine in Jolon, California during the early 1870s, and he held a belief that he had discovered oil in Arroyo Seco in the year 1878.

In 1885, following a life marked by the highs and lows of the gold rush era, Swan concluded his journey and retired to his old adobe home without any financial resources.

== Death ==
Swan died of a heart attack on January 6, 1896, at the County Hospital near Salinas, at the age of 77. He died without any descendants. Other town pioneers organized the funeral arrangements, overseen by Rev. R. Rogers, the clergyman of the First Presbyterian Church, who conducted the services. His body was conveyed to Monterey for interment at the Monterey City Cemetery.

== See also ==
- Coastal California
