= California Historical Landmark =

Historical significance structures or sites

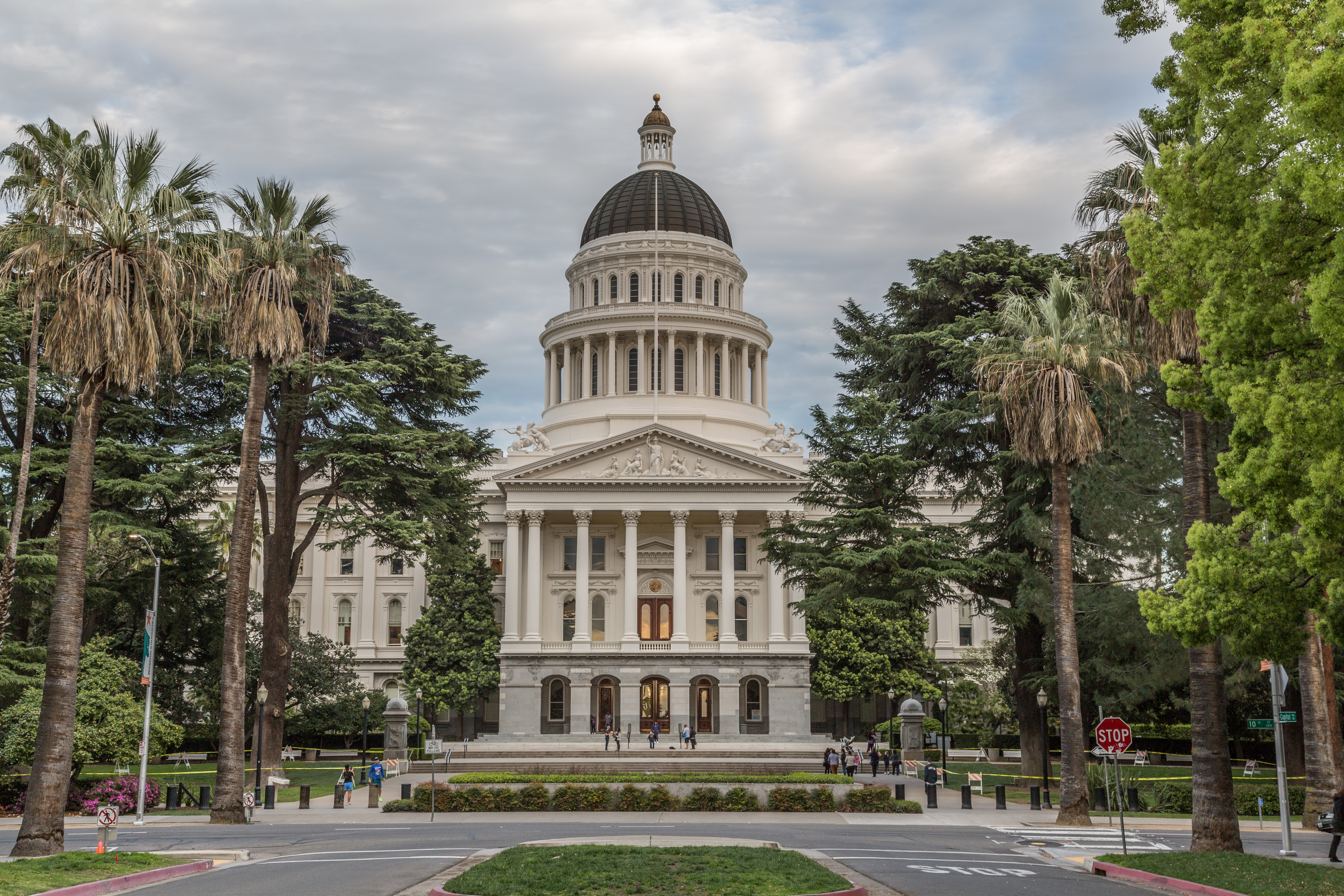
The California State Capitol, one of the state's most visited historical landmarks

A California Historical Landmark (CHL) is a building, structure, site, or place in the U.S. state of California that has been determined to have statewide historical landmark significance.

== Criteria ==
Historical significance is determined by meeting at least one of these criteria:

1. The first, last, only, or most significant of its type in the state or within a large geographic region (Northern, Central, or Southern California);
2. Associated with an individual or group having a profound influence on the history of California; or
3. An outstanding example of a period, style, architectural movement or construction; or is the best surviving work in a region of a pioneer architect, designer, or master builder.

== Other designations ==
California Historical Landmarks numbered 770 and higher are automatically listed in the California Register of Historical Resources.

A site, building, feature, or event that is of local (city or county) significance may be designated as a California Point of Historical Interest.

== Gallery ==
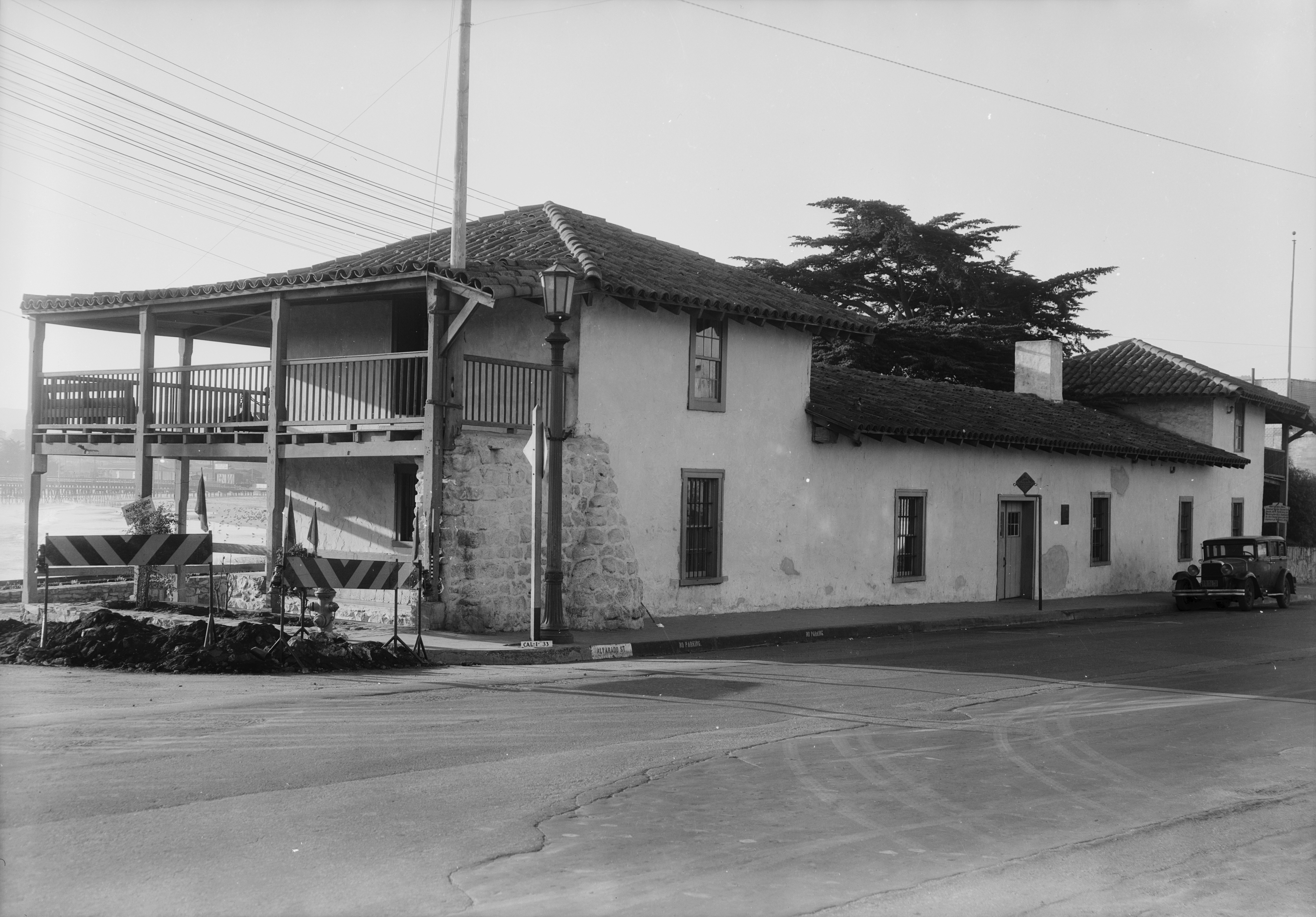
The Old Custom House in Monterey, the first designated California Historical Landmark, where U.S. Commodore John Drake Sloat raised the American flag and declared California part of the United States in 1846

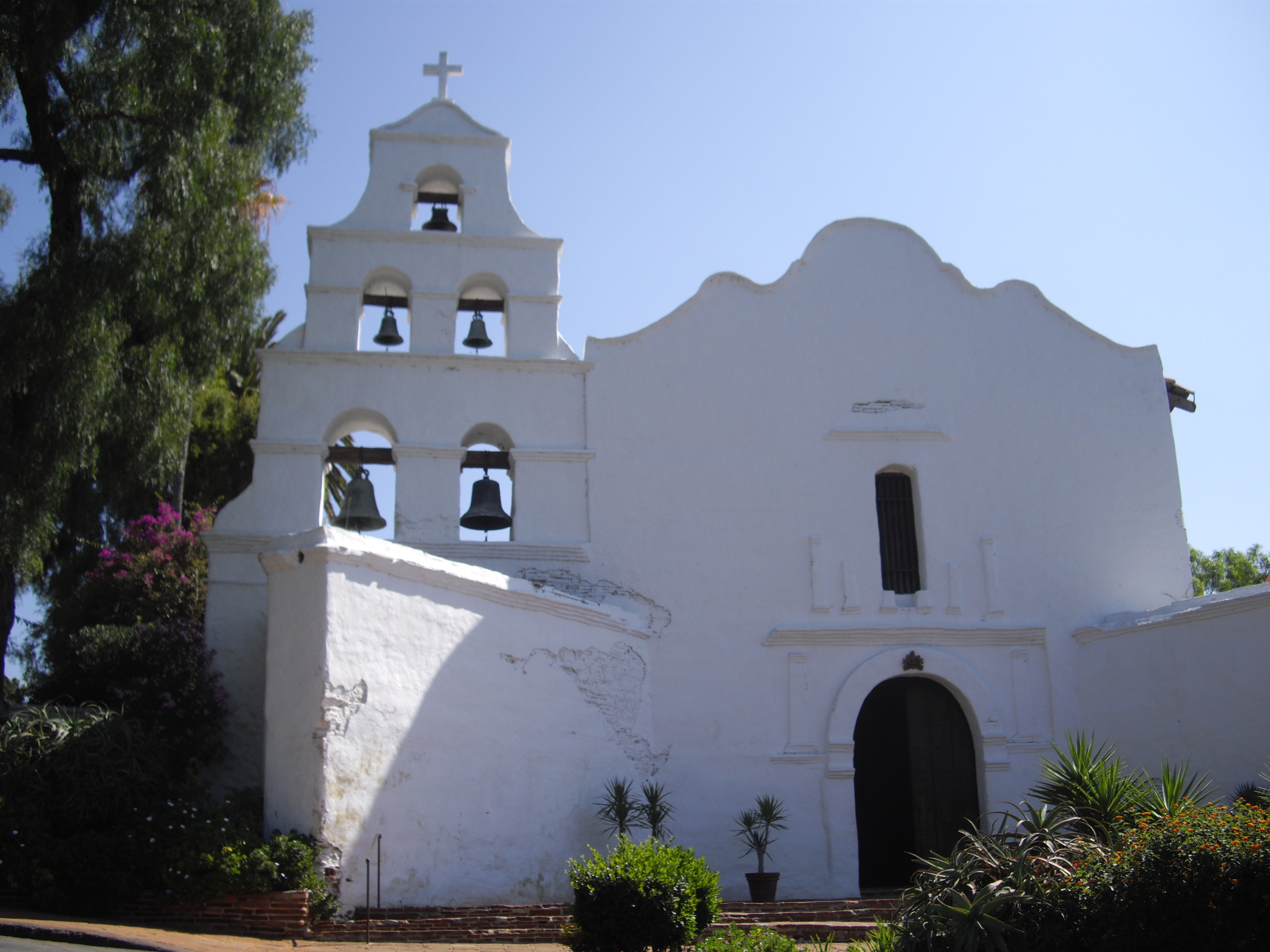
Mission San Diego de Alcalá in San Diego was founded as the first Spanish mission in California in 1769.

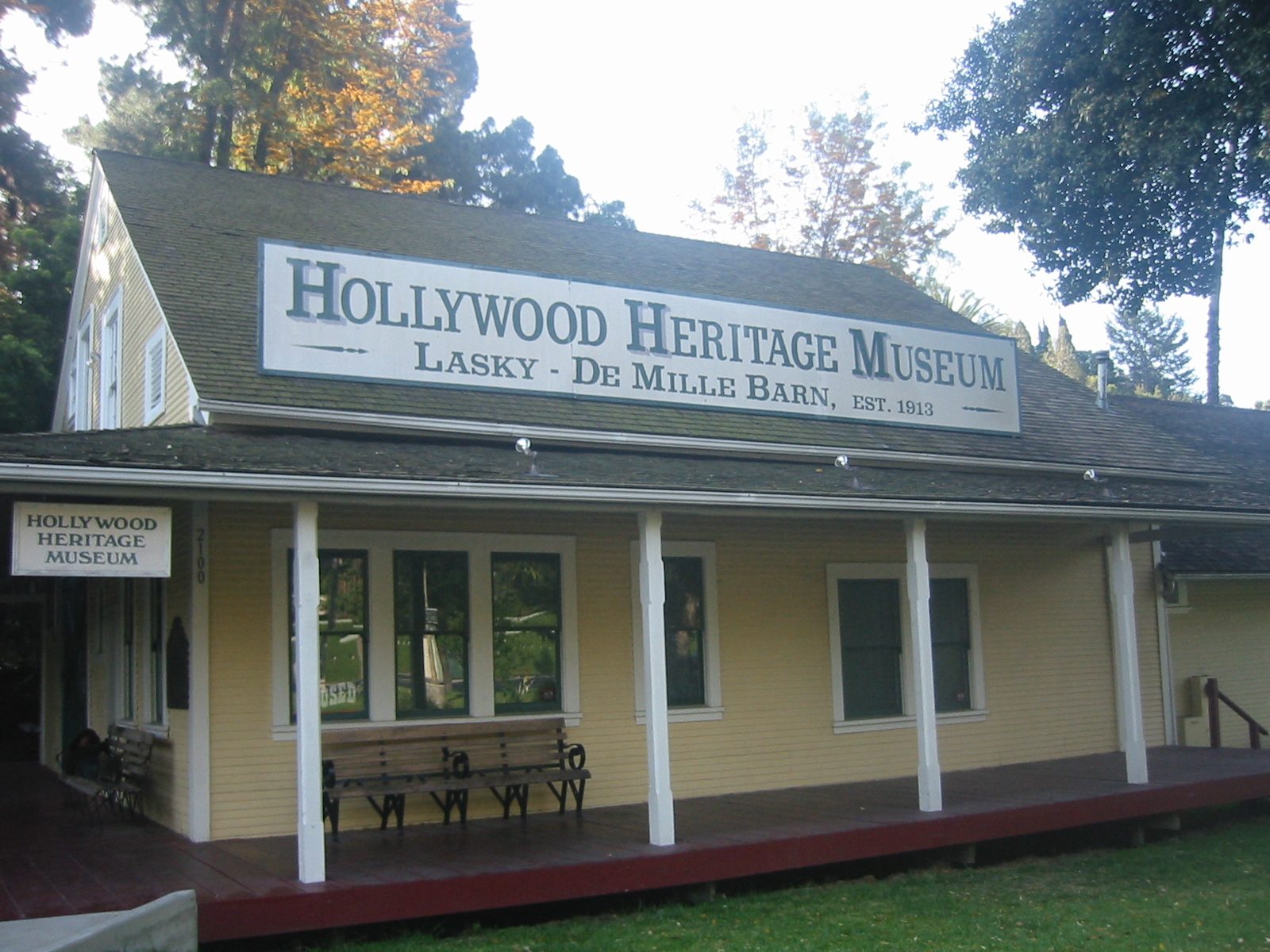
The Cecil B. DeMille Studio Barn, now the Hollywood Heritage Museum, was where Cecil B. DeMille and Jesse Lasky established Hollywood's first major film company studio in 1913.

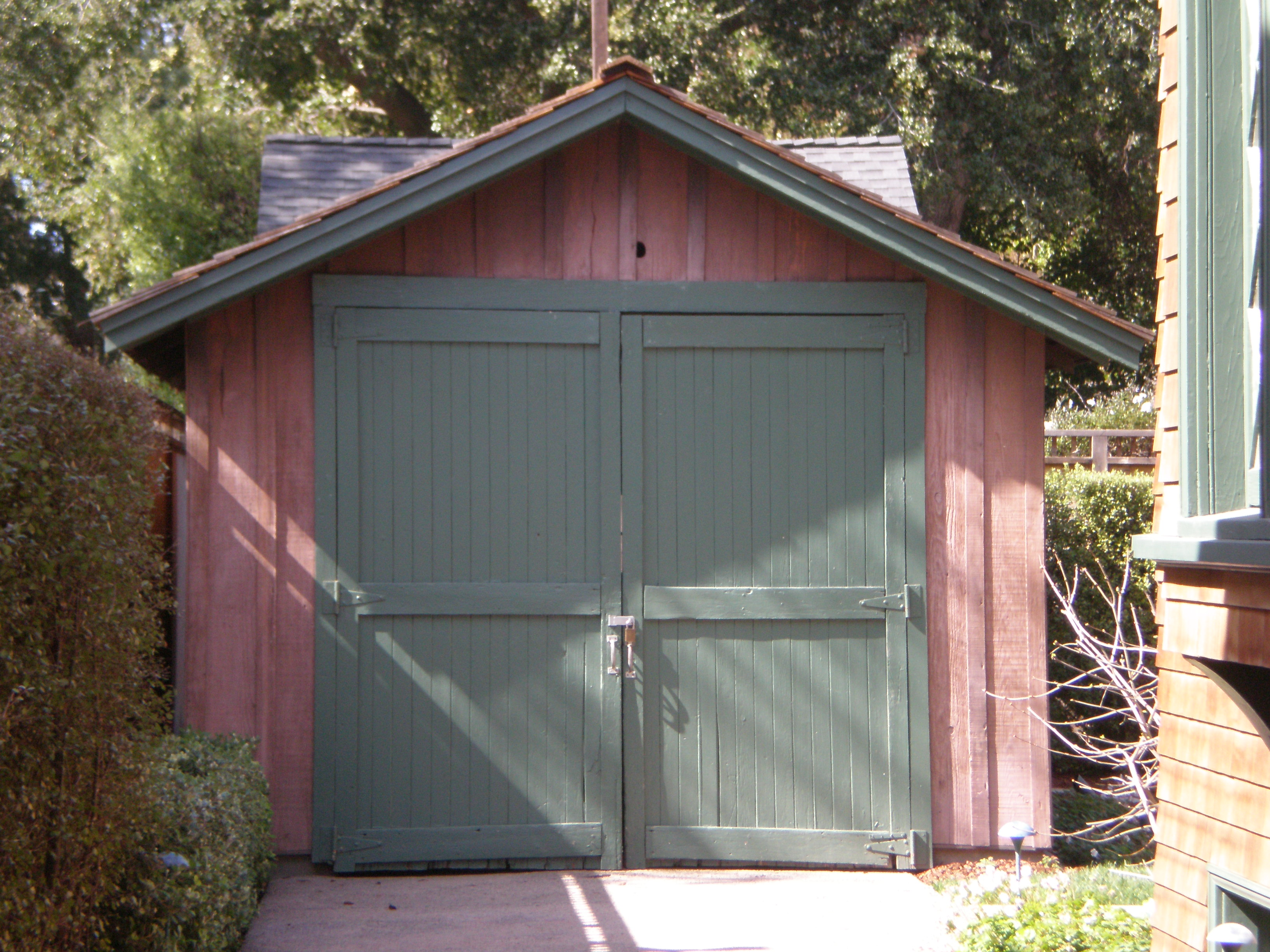
The HP Garage in Palo Alto, considered the "Birthplace of Silicon Valley", where David Packard and William Redington Hewlett developed their first product in the 1930s

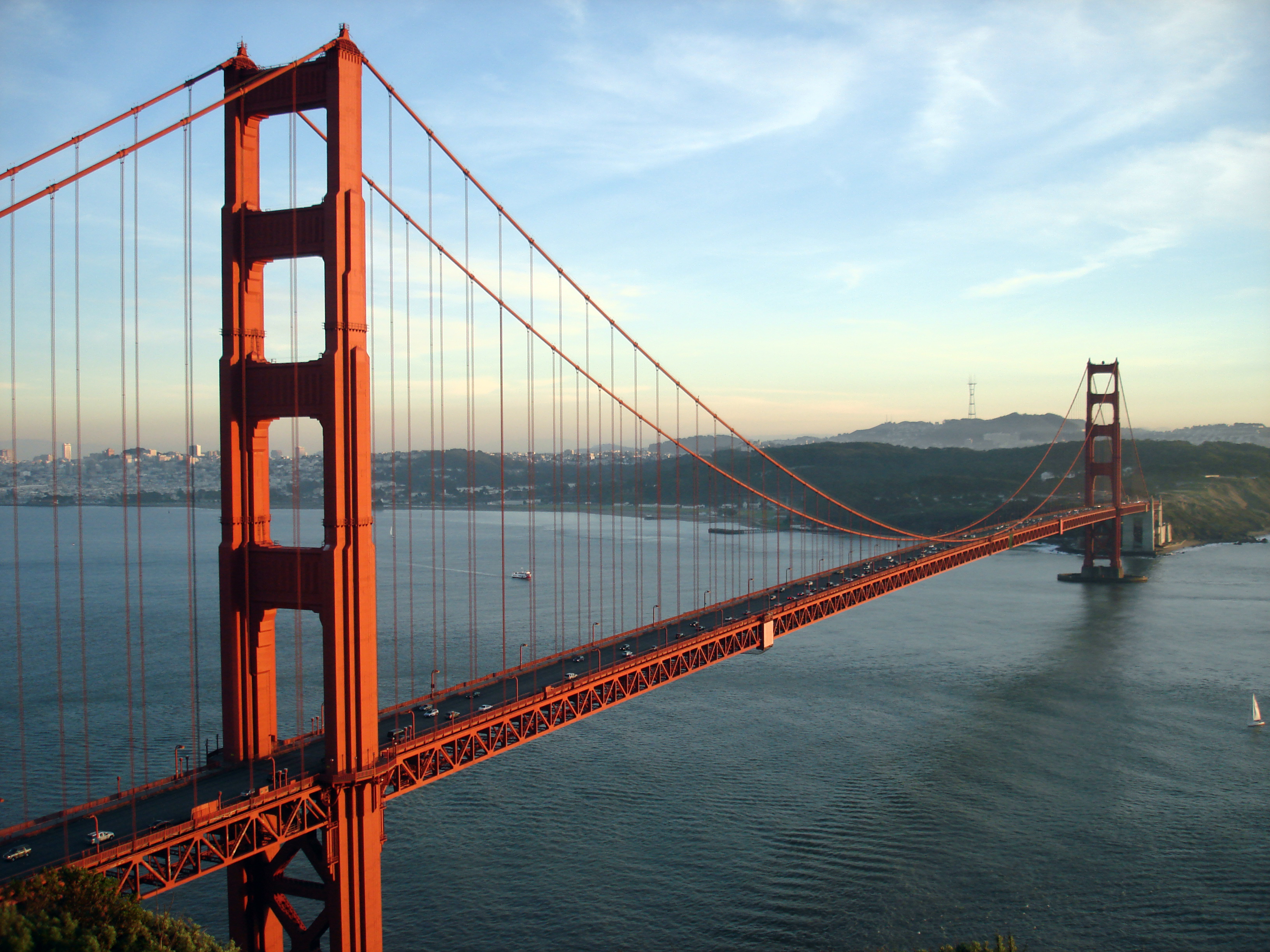
The Golden Gate Bridge, connecting San Francisco with Marin County

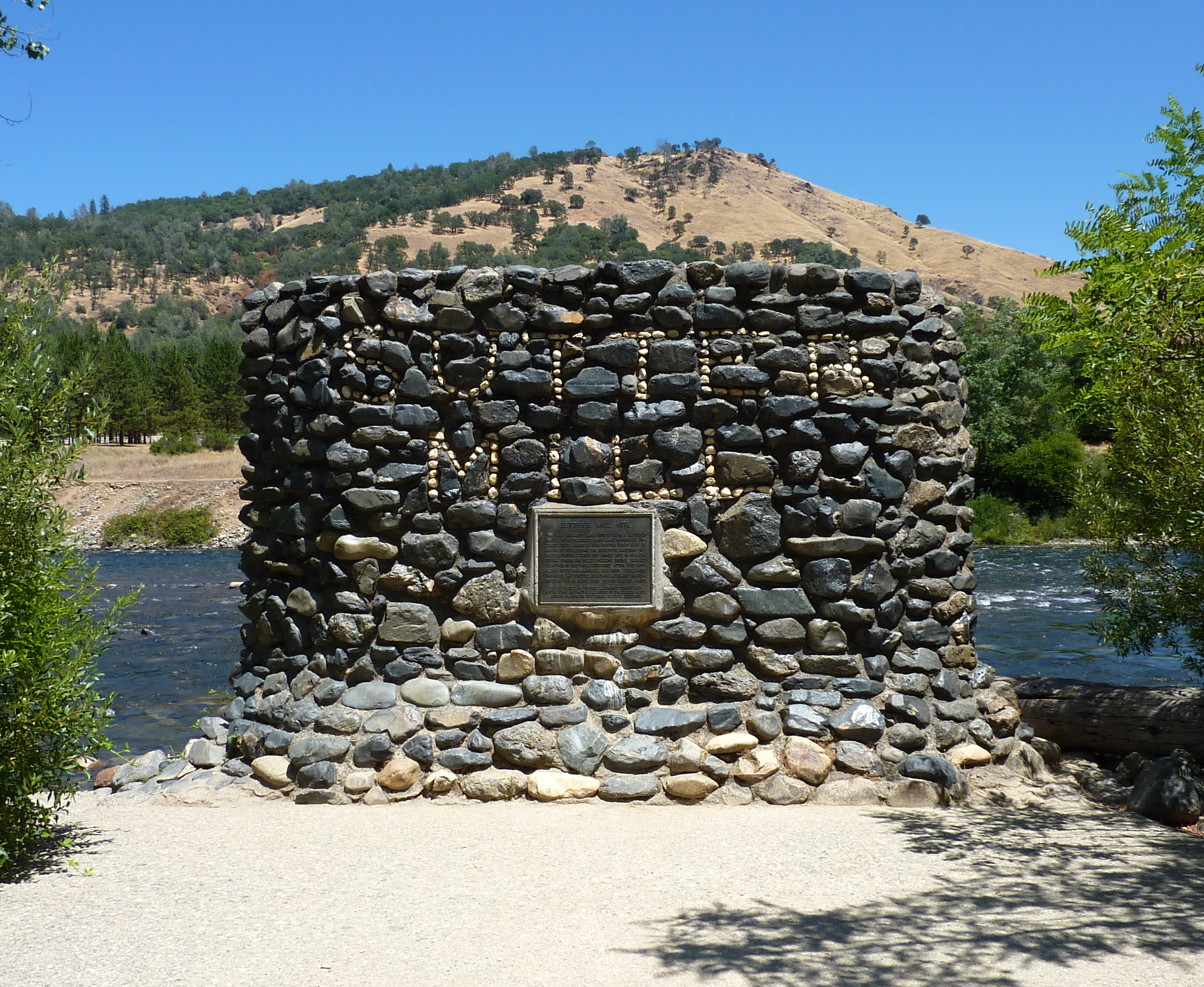
Sutter's Mill, Marshall Gold Discovery Site, where James W. Marshall first discovered gold in 1848, sparking the California Gold Rush

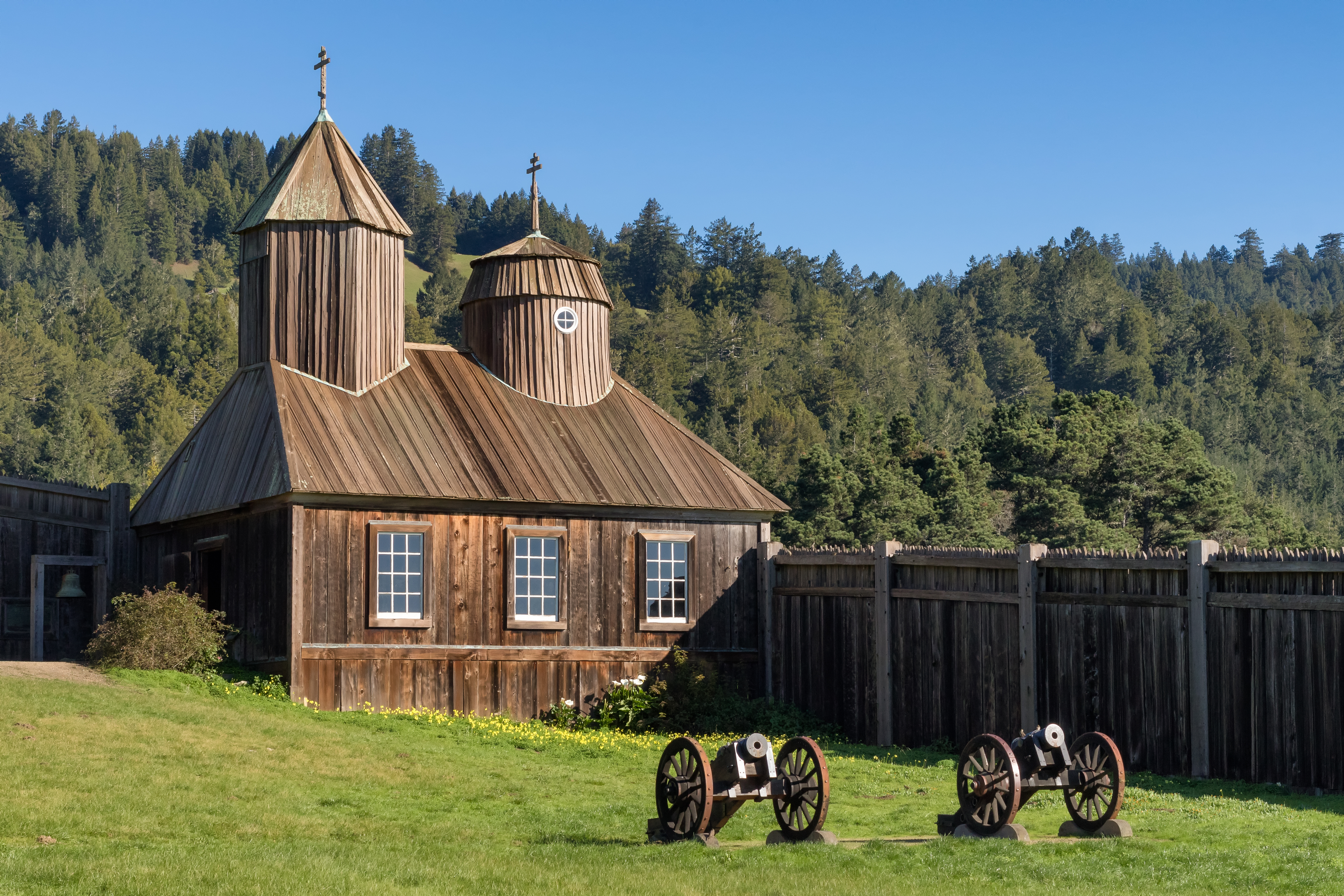
Fort Ross was established as a trading post by Russian colonists in 1812.

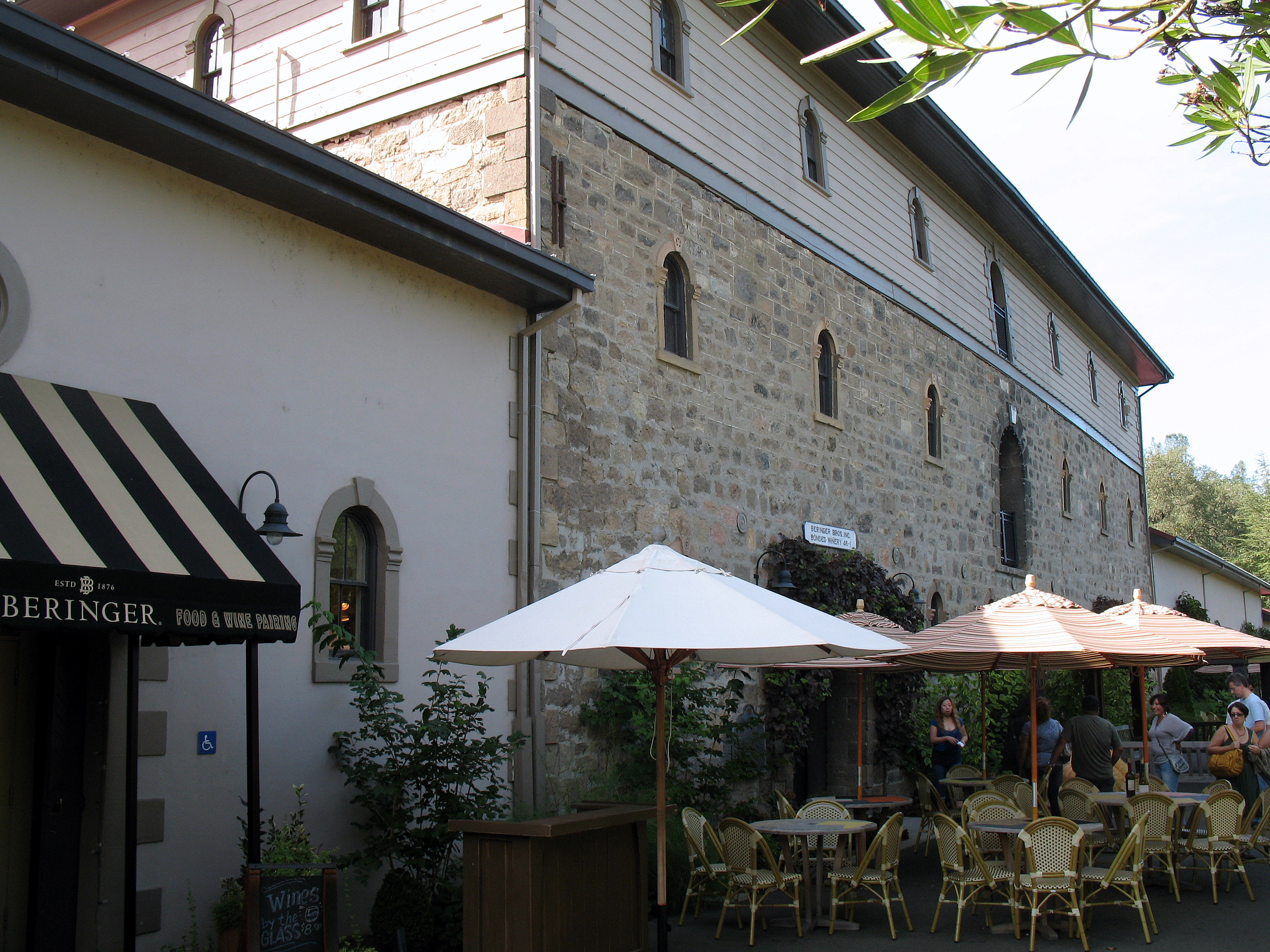
Founded in 1875, Beringer is the oldest continuously operating winery in the Napa Valley.

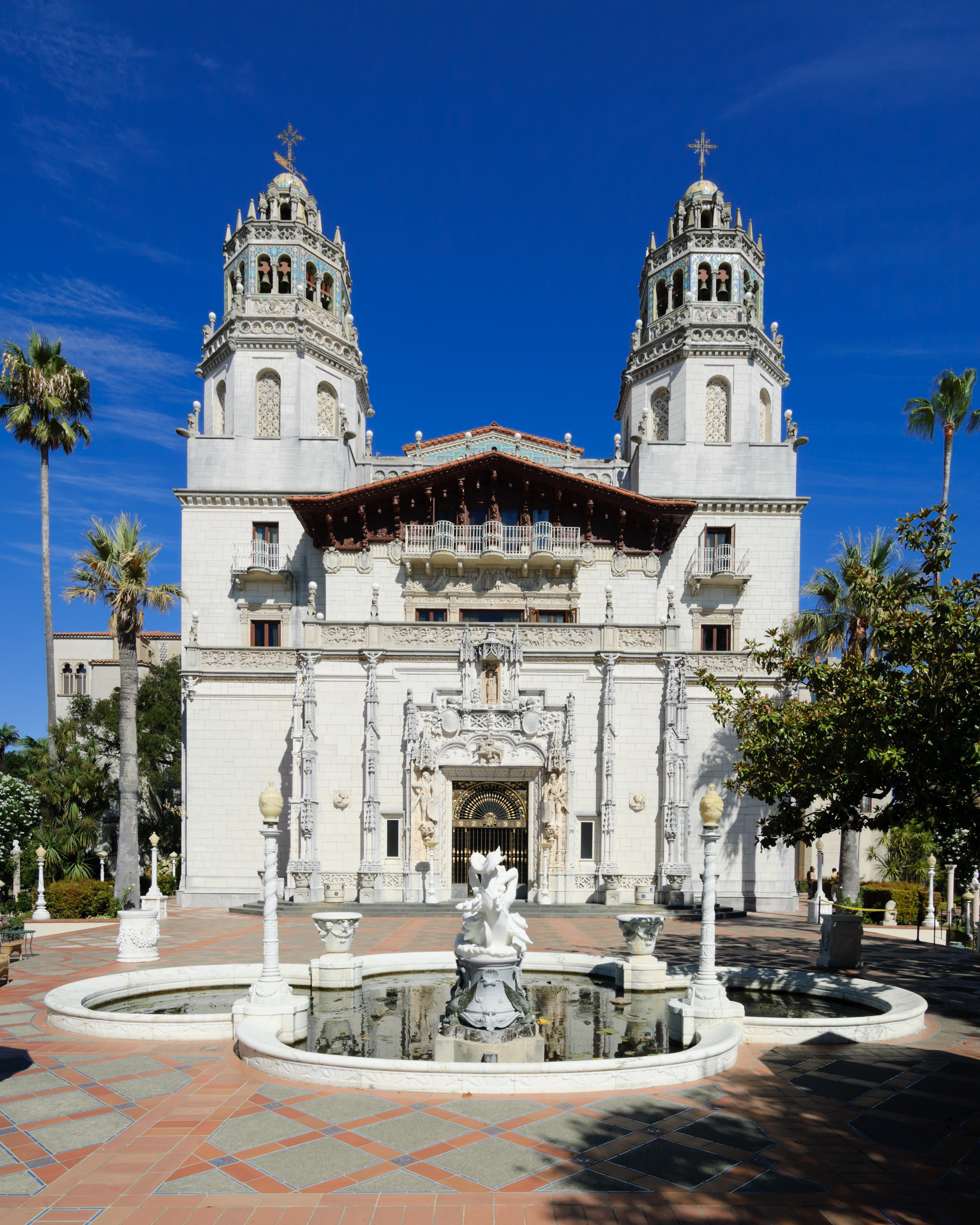
Hearst Castle

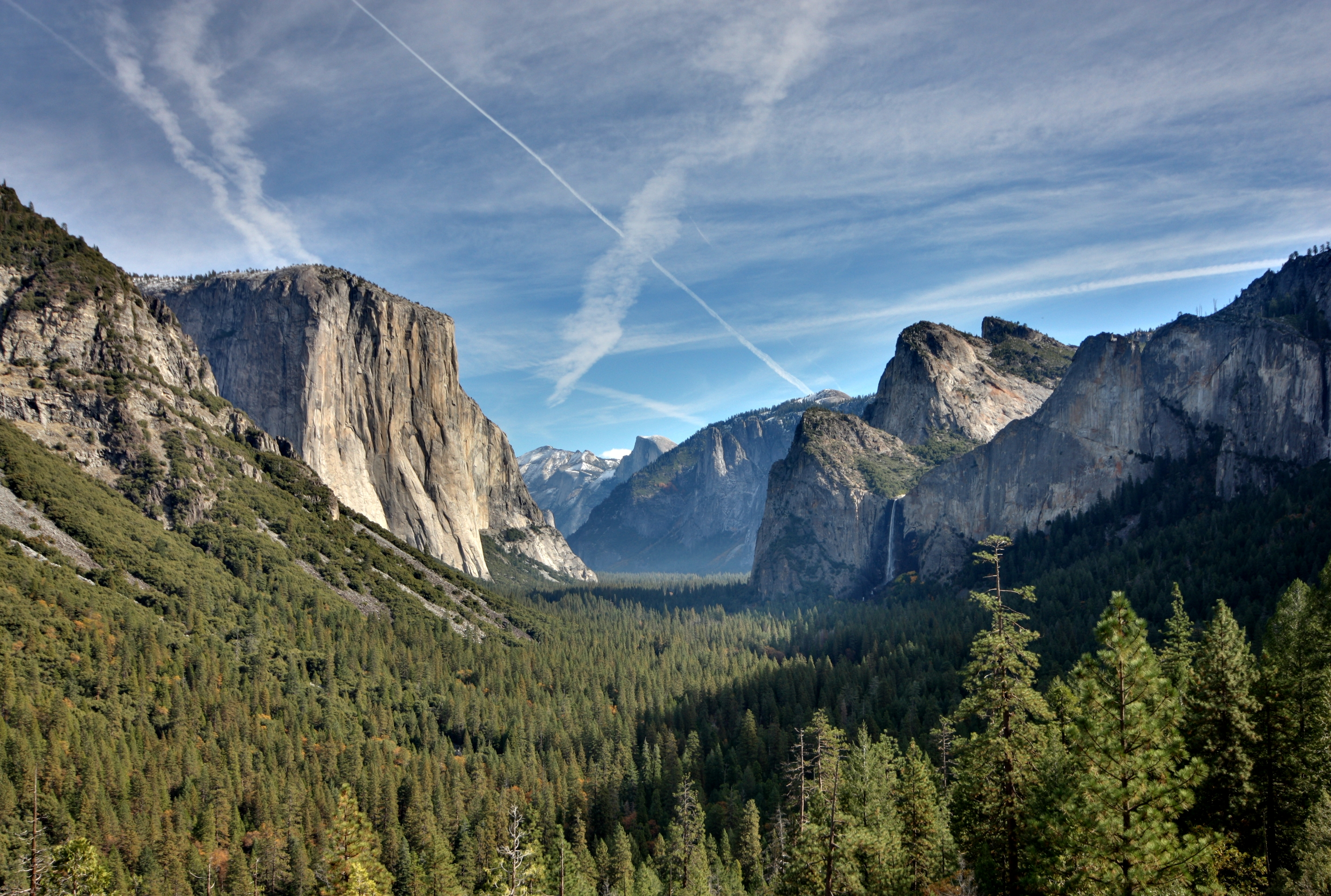
Yosemite Valley

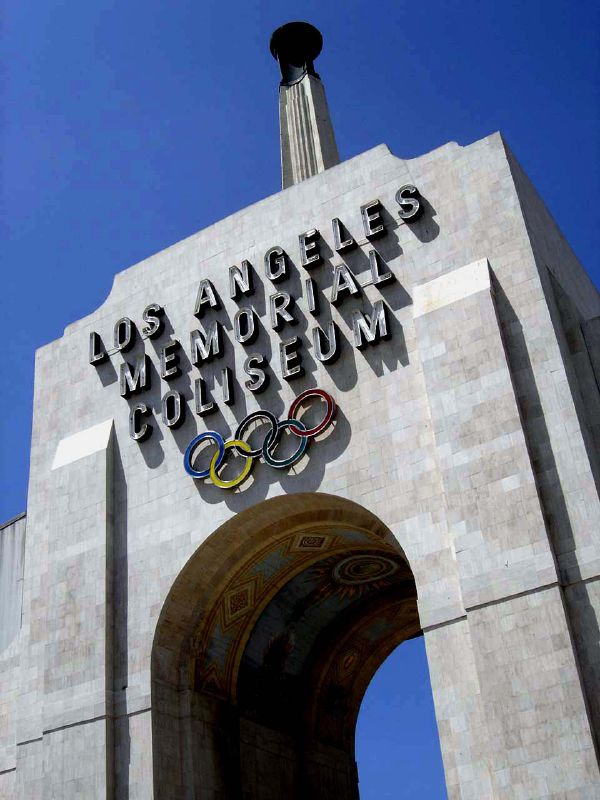
The Los Angeles Memorial Coliseum, opened in 1923

The California Manual on Uniform Traffic Control Devices specifies a standard road sign guiding motorists to California Historical Landmarks, such as Mission Santa Cruz.

== See also ==
- List of California Historical Landmarks by county
- California Historic Landmarks League

=== Federal historical landmarks ===
- National Historic Sites (United States)
- National Register of Historic Places listings in California

=== Local historical landmarks ===
- Bakersfield Register of Historic Places and Areas of Historic Interest
- Berkeley Landmarks in Berkeley, California
- Glendale Register of Historic Resources and Historic Districts
- Long Beach historic landmarks
- Los Angeles Historic-Cultural Monuments
- Oakland Designated Landmarks
- San Diego Historic Landmarks
- San Francisco Designated Landmarks
- San Luis Obispo Historic Resources
- Santa Barbara Historic Landmarks
- Santa Monica Designated Historic Landmarks
- City of Ventura Historic Landmarks and Districts
- Ventura County Historic Landmarks & Points of Interest
