= Old Custom House (Monterey, California) =

- U.S. National Register of Historic Places
- U.S. National Historic Landmark
- California Historical Landmark
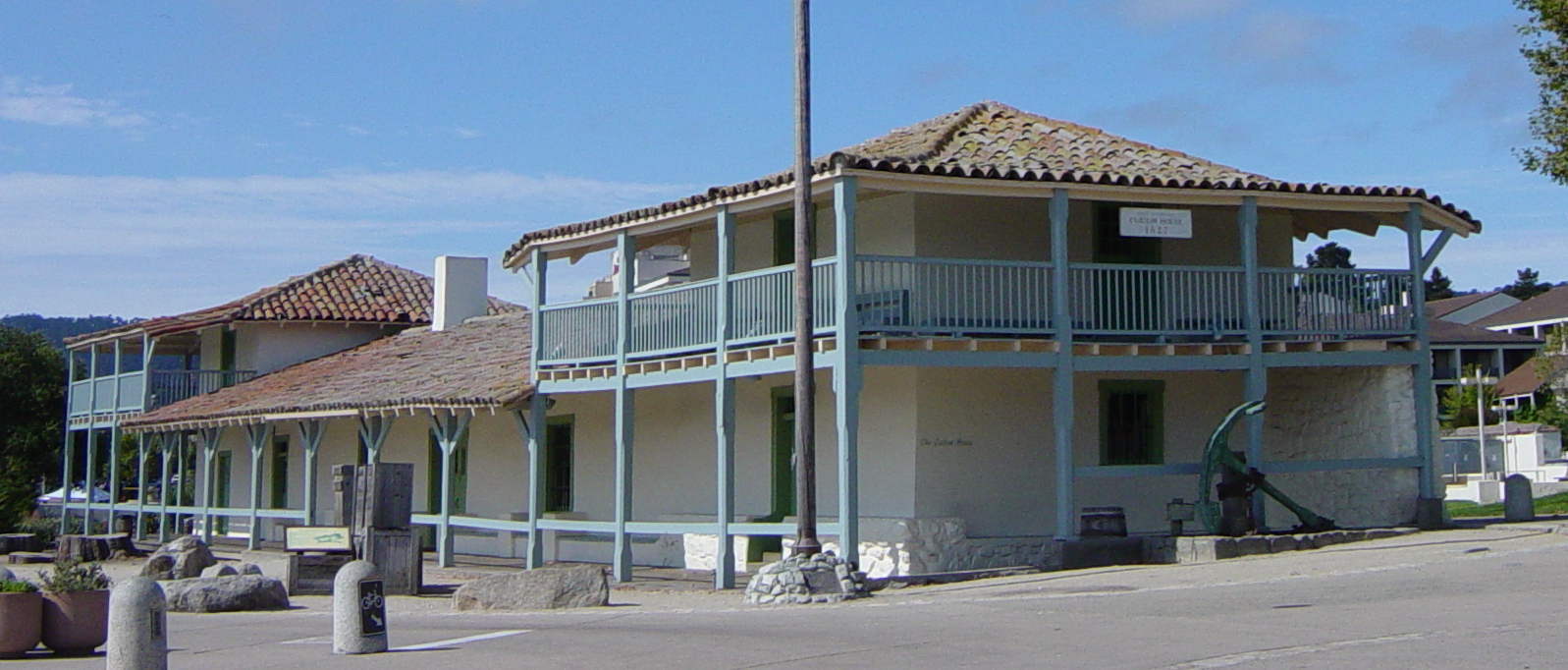

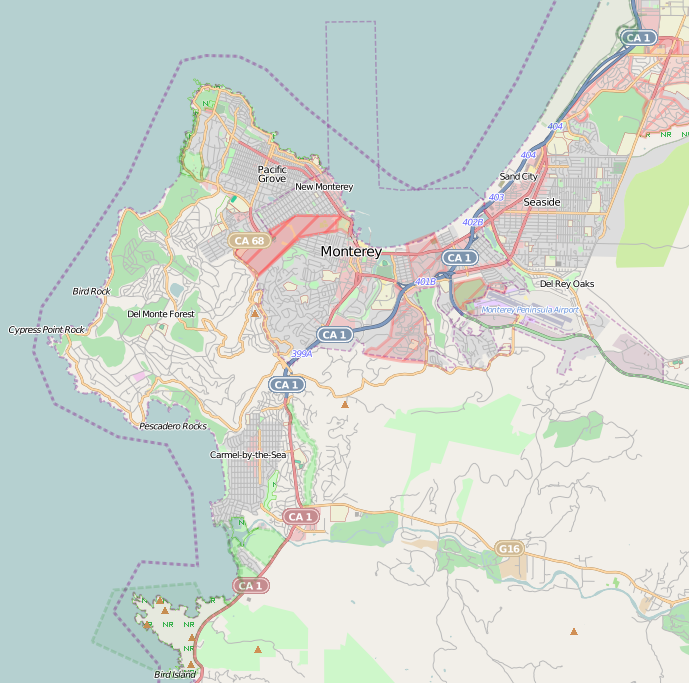
- Location within Monterey Peninsula
- Location: Monterey, California
- Coordinates: 36°36′11.7″N 121°53′36.8″W
- Area: 2 acres (0.81 ha)
- Built: 1827
- Architectural style: Spanish Colonial Adobe
- NRHP reference No.: 66000217
- CHISL No.: 1

Significant dates
- Added to NRHP: October 15, 1966
- Designated NHL: December 19, 1960
- Designated CHISL: June 1, 1932

The Old Custom House (Spanish: Antigua Aduana) is the oldest surviving government building in California, built in 1827 by Mexican authorities in Monterey, then the capital of Alta California. The former custom house is the first designated California Historical Landmark, marking the site where U.S. Commodore John Drake Sloat raised the American flag and declared California part of the United States in 1846 during the American Conquest of California.

== History ==
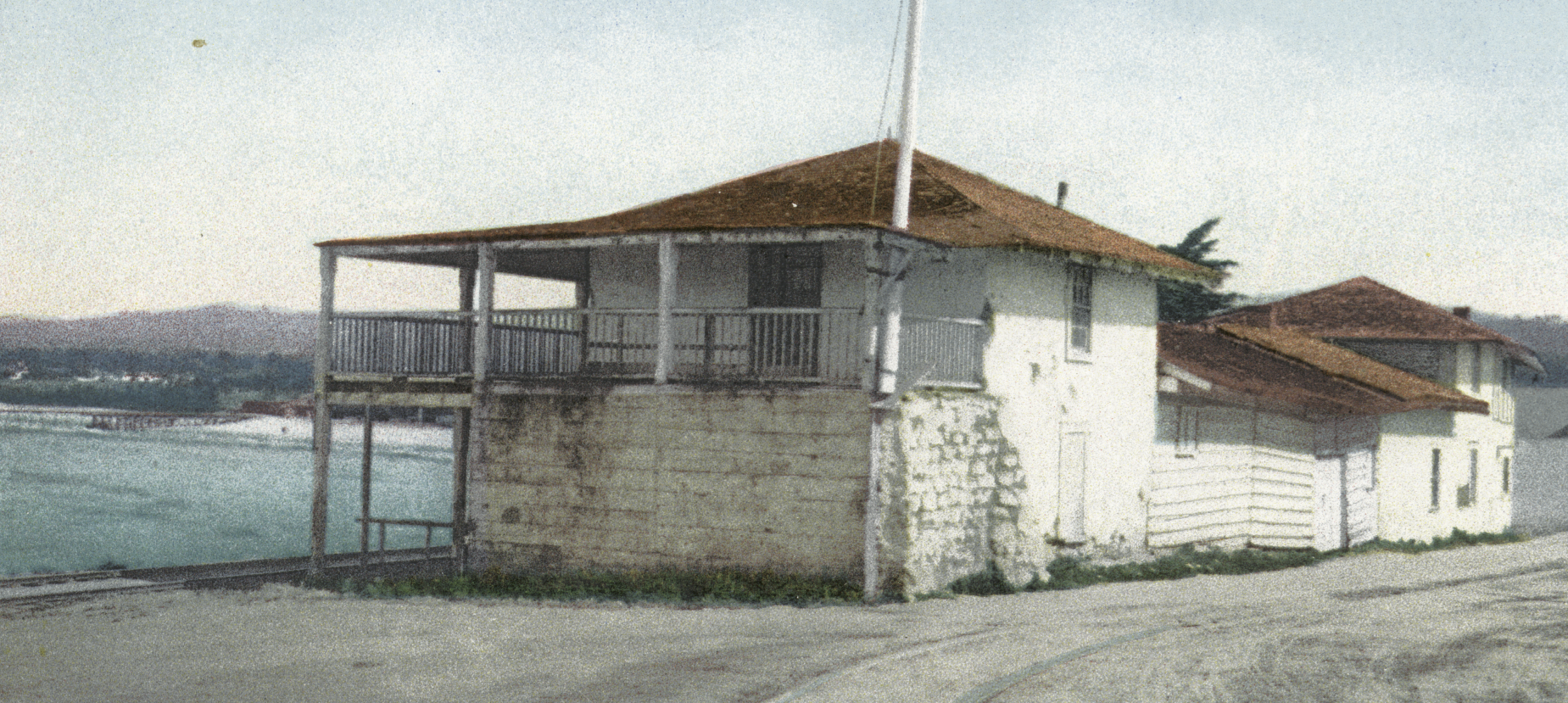
View of the Old Custom House, photographed between 1898 and 1902.

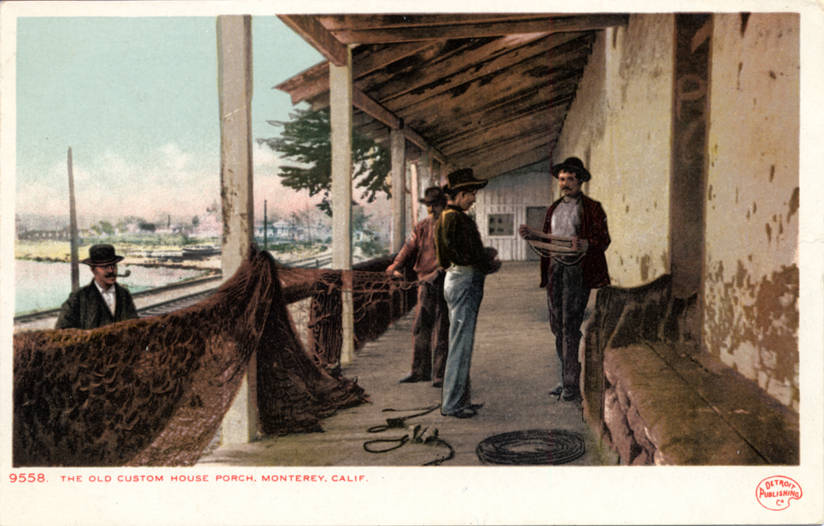
Fishermen at the Old Custom House, circa 1900.

In 1821 New Spain—Mexico won independence from Spain, in the Mexican War of Independence, and for nearly 25 years Monterey was in the Mexican Territory of Alta California. Under Mexican rule the trade restrictions were lifted and coastal ports were opened to foreign trade. This drew in trade from British, American, and South American traders.

To collect customs duties (tax monies) at the Monterey Bay port, the Mexican government built the Custom House, making it the oldest government building in present-day California.

On July 7, 1846, during the Mexican–American War, U.S. Commodore John Drake Sloat raised the American flag, declaring California part of the United States during the American Conquest of California.

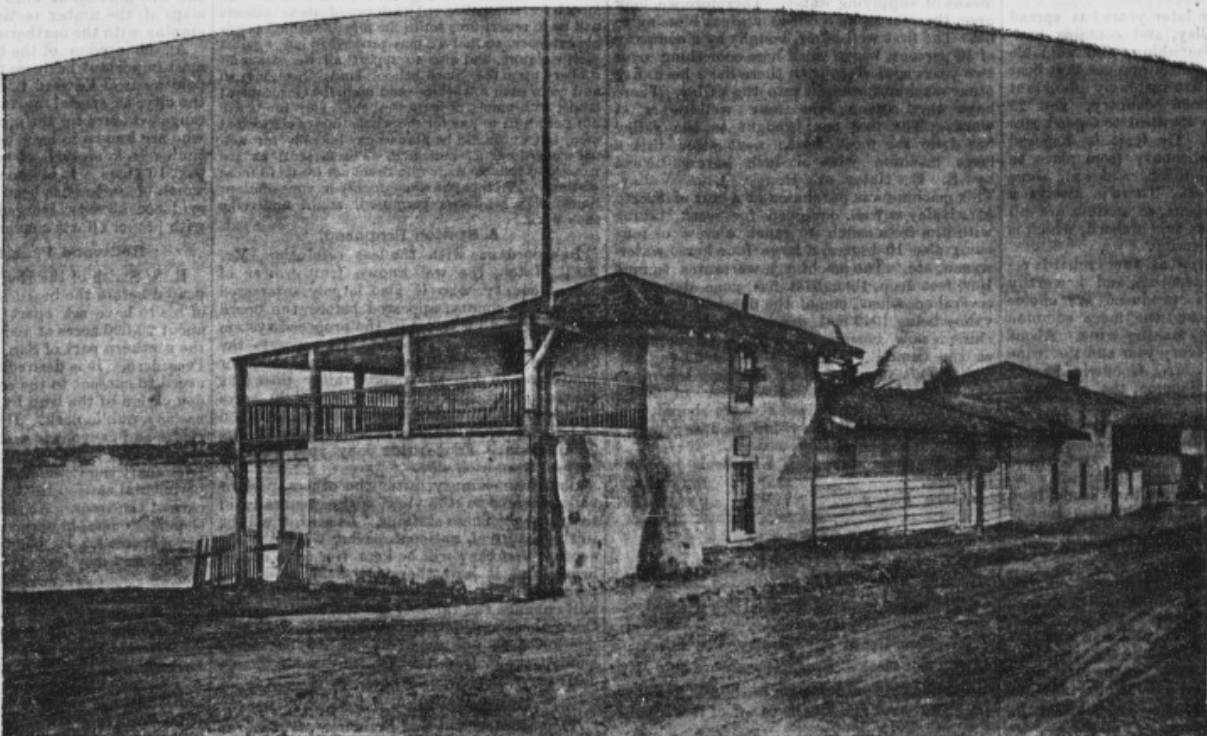
Old Custom House photographed in 1887

== Historic preservation ==
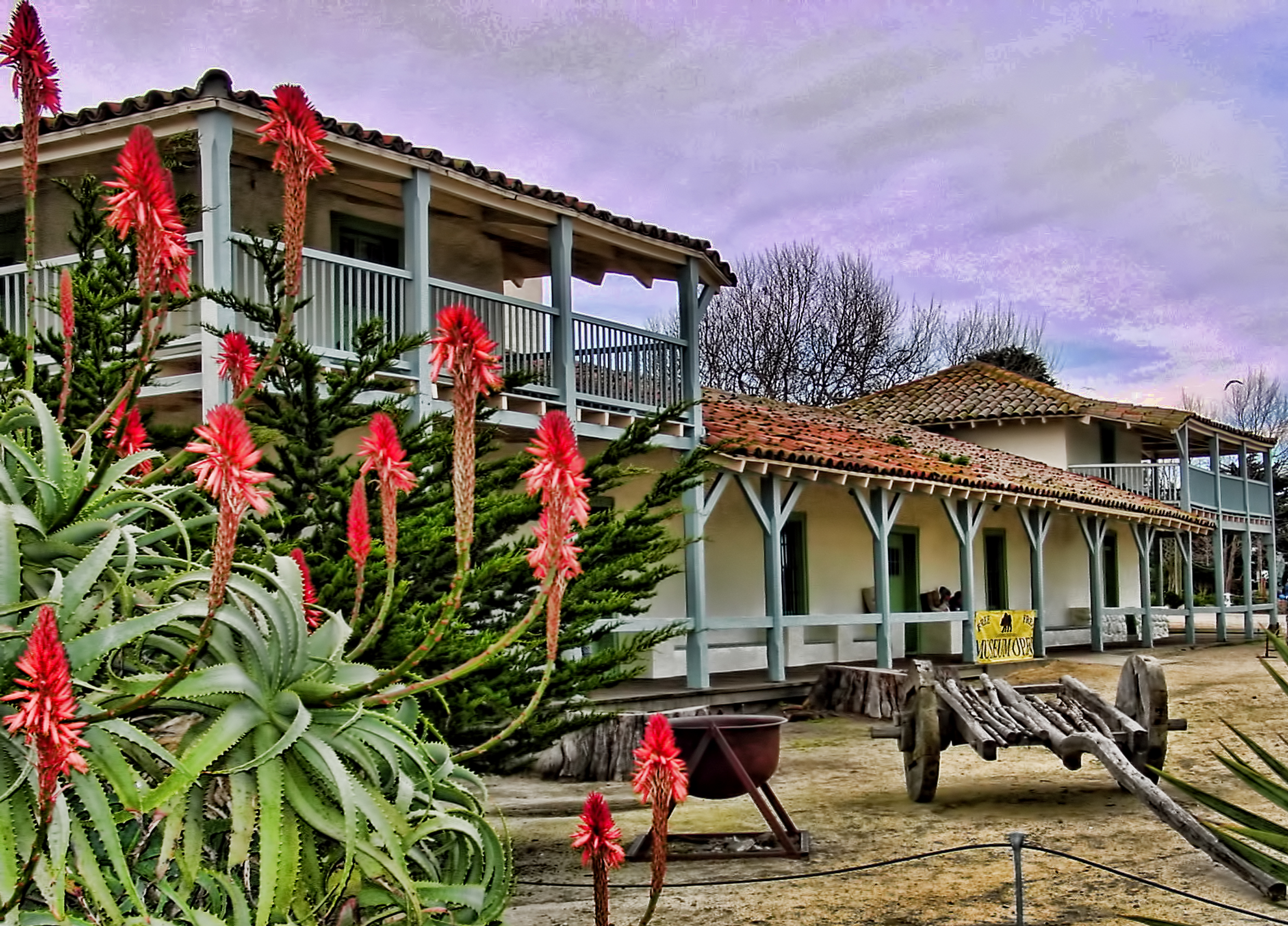
The Old Custom House in 2004.

The Monterey Custom House was a landmark that the Native Sons of the Golden West determined should not disappear if within their power to prevent it. The property belonged to the United States Government, but the Native Sons obtained a lease of the buildings and grounds and restored them in the early 1900s. The lease was ultimately transferred to a State Commission appointed under a legislative act passed in 1901, which act also carried an appropriation for further restoration of the building.

The Custom House became the first California Historical Landmark on June 1, 1932, and was designated a National Historic Landmark in 1960. It is part of the larger Monterey State Historic Park, itself a National Historic Landmark District along with the nearby Larkin House.

== See also ==
- National Register of Historic Places listings in Monterey County, California
- California hide trade
- List of the oldest buildings in California
