= California Historic Landmarks League =

- Abbreviation: CHLL
- Formation: June 1902
- Founder: Laura Bride Powers
- Founded at: San Francisco
- Type: Nonprofit
- Purpose: conservation and restoration of cultural property, principally Spanish missions in California
- Region served: Northern California
- President: Joseph R. Knowland
- Affiliations: Native Daughters of the Golden West; Society of California Pioneers, California Club; Native Sons of the Golden West; Young Men's Institute
- Funding: public subscription

The California Historic Landmarks League (CHLL) was an American non-profit organization focused on the conservation and restoration of cultural property. Established in San Francisco, in June 1902, it was formed for the purpose of caring for the historic landmarks of California, particularly in the northern section of the State. The objects of the CHLL as set forth in its articles of incorporation, were, briefly stated, to preserve the historic landmarks of the State, notably the Spanish missions, to place in appropriate places memorial tablets commemorative of historic places and events, and to encourage historic research.

The Landmarks Club of Southern California, established in 1895, had, for a number of years, been successfully engaged in a like work in the southern section of the State. Subsequently, state and national park services, the Heart Foundation, and the Catholic Church took over the work started by the Landmarks Club and the CHLL organizations. The California Historical Landmark program became official in 1931, the state legislation requiring the Department of Natural Resources "to register and mark buildings of historical interest or landmarks".

== History ==
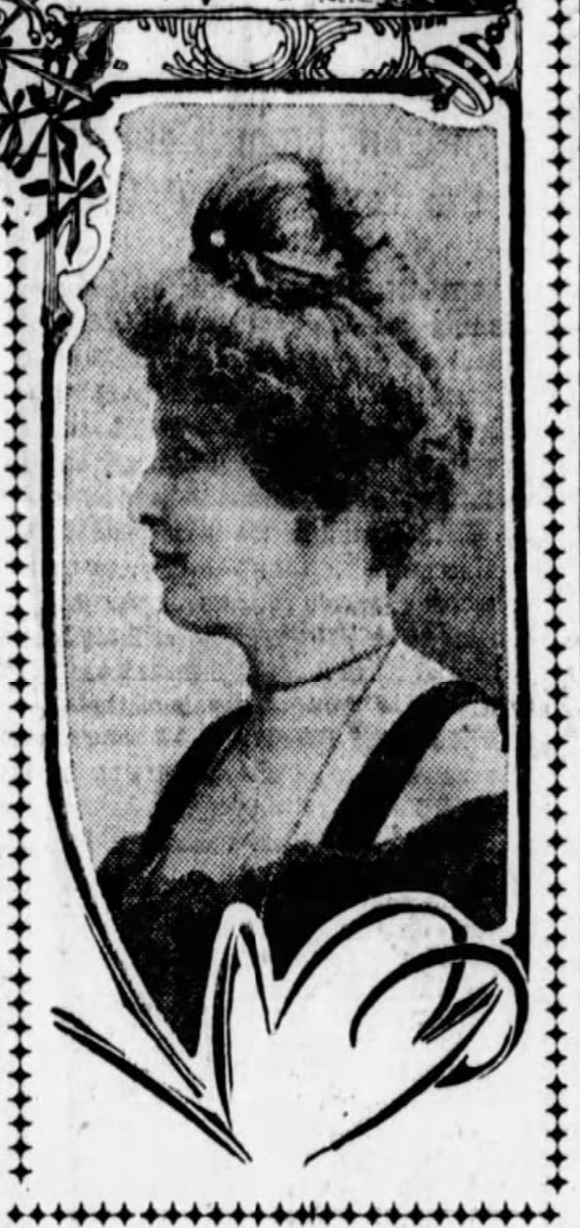
Laura Bride Powers, founder

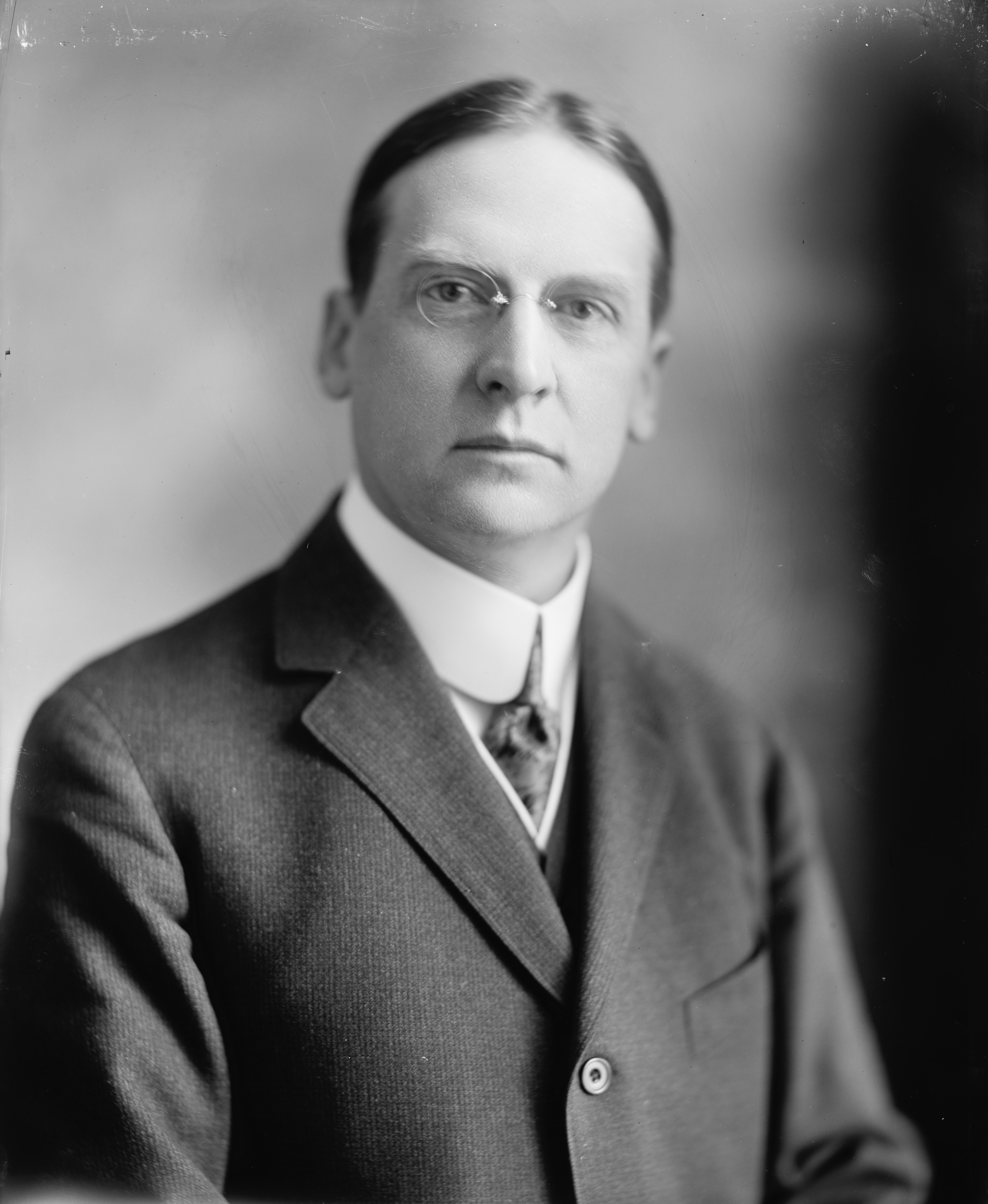
Joseph R. Knowland, president

The spirit of protecting Old Missions of California was brought into being by the Landmarks Club of Southern California, founded and fostered by Charles Fletcher Lummis. Its area of activities were limited to the 300 miles (480 km) of that region.

Believing, however, that the conservation of the landmarks of California too gigantic a task for one body of people, the CHLL was formed in June 1902, after an appeal to a group of women by Laura Bride Powers, a former San Francisco newspaperwoman. In less than a year, she had the thousands of members of the Native Daughters of the Golden West, the Daughters of California Pioneers, and the California Club, wanting the same thing. This army of women enlisted men, with their organizations-the Native Sons of the Golden West, the California Pioneers, and the Young Men's Institute.

The region that the CHLL served was immense: 1,000 miles (1,600 km) north and south and about 300 miles (480 km) wide. Powers served as secretary and Joseph R. Knowland was its president. He traveled through the state for the purpose of raising a Restoration Fund, and a fund was raised by public subscription.

It was understood that while the board of directors was chosen with a view towards honoring as many societies as possible, accepting a position on that Board in no sense was to be understood to be an attempt to commit the societies to the support of the movement. Each name enrolled upon the CHLL's list of members was that of an individual. It was in order for the different societies so represented to pass resolutions endorsing the aims and objects of the CHLL.

The body was controlled by the Native Sons and Native Daughters of the Golden West, and the Pioneers of California, advised by lawyers, architects, and artists within its membership, incorporated and offering itself as the instrument by which it could realize its plan of restoring and protecting all the landmarks of the State, with no tax upon the treasury of its Golden West Order. The membership fee was one dollar a year. Every Native Son and every Native Daughter was urged to become identified with the movement, and also to recruit its membership from the ranks of those not eligible to membership in the Golden West Order.

The CHLL officers were chosen principally from the Golden West organizations. No salaries were paid. By a provision of the by-laws, all plans for the restoration of historic buildings, and all designs for proposed monuments or memorial tablets, were passed upon by an advisory board composed of three artists, three architects, and representatives from the leading educational institutions of the State, thus insuring intelligent restoration.

== Works ==
In March 1903, a memorial tablet was dedicated, marking the site of Fort Gunnybags at San Francisco. The CHLL assisted materially in arousing public sentiment that resulted in the purchase of the old Russian settlement at Fort Ross (at Sonoma County, the landing place of Father Junipero Serra at Monterey, and the Mission San Francisco Solano at Sonoma.

The Sonoma mission, which was being used as a stable, was purchased and presented to the State, as was the site of the landing of Sebastián Vizcaíno in 1602. It was Vizcaíno's maps and charts which enabled the Jesuit, Father Junipero Serra, to undertake his expedition in 1769. Subsequently, the Mission of San Antonio de Padua, in Monterey County, was leased, and its crumbling adobe walls, roof-beams and tiling, were restored. When the women effected the lease, pigs were stying in the mission among the graves of six of California's founders. Fort Ross, where the Russians set up a trading post and made a stand against the Spaniards and Indians in 1812, and the old adobe theater in Monterey, were also purchased and presented to the State.

== Articles of incorporation ==
"The purpose for which the California Historic Landmarks League is founded are to restore and preserve, maintain and care for buildings, monuments and sites throughout the State of California, commemorative of the early history of the State, including the Missions of California and any building, site or road which is of historic interest, either from its association with the early Spanish settlers or the American occupation, or with the California Pioneers, as well as to erect and maintain monuments, and place in appropriate places memorial tablets commemorative of historic places and events to the end that said buildings, monuments, sites and roads might be preserved as emblems of the style of architecture in vogue during the early periods of California life, as well as to serve as object lessons to the students of California history, and for that purpose to buy and sell, acquire and hold, receive in trust, lease and receive leases of lands and their appurtenances, water, water rights, or stock in water companies; to receive and hold personal property of all kinds and collect money by dues from the members of said corporation. or by lectures and entertainments, or otherwise, for the furtherance of said objects; to receive and hold either by purchase or donation, relics and documents of historical value, and store and exhibit them in appropriate places; to encourage historical research and the study of California history, and to use all proper means to establish a Chair of California history in the University of California, and incorporate the study of California history in the curriculum of the State as a regular course of study and to do any and all other things necessary and convenient to accomplish such objects or any of them."
