= Sherman Quarters =

California Historical Landmark in Monterey County

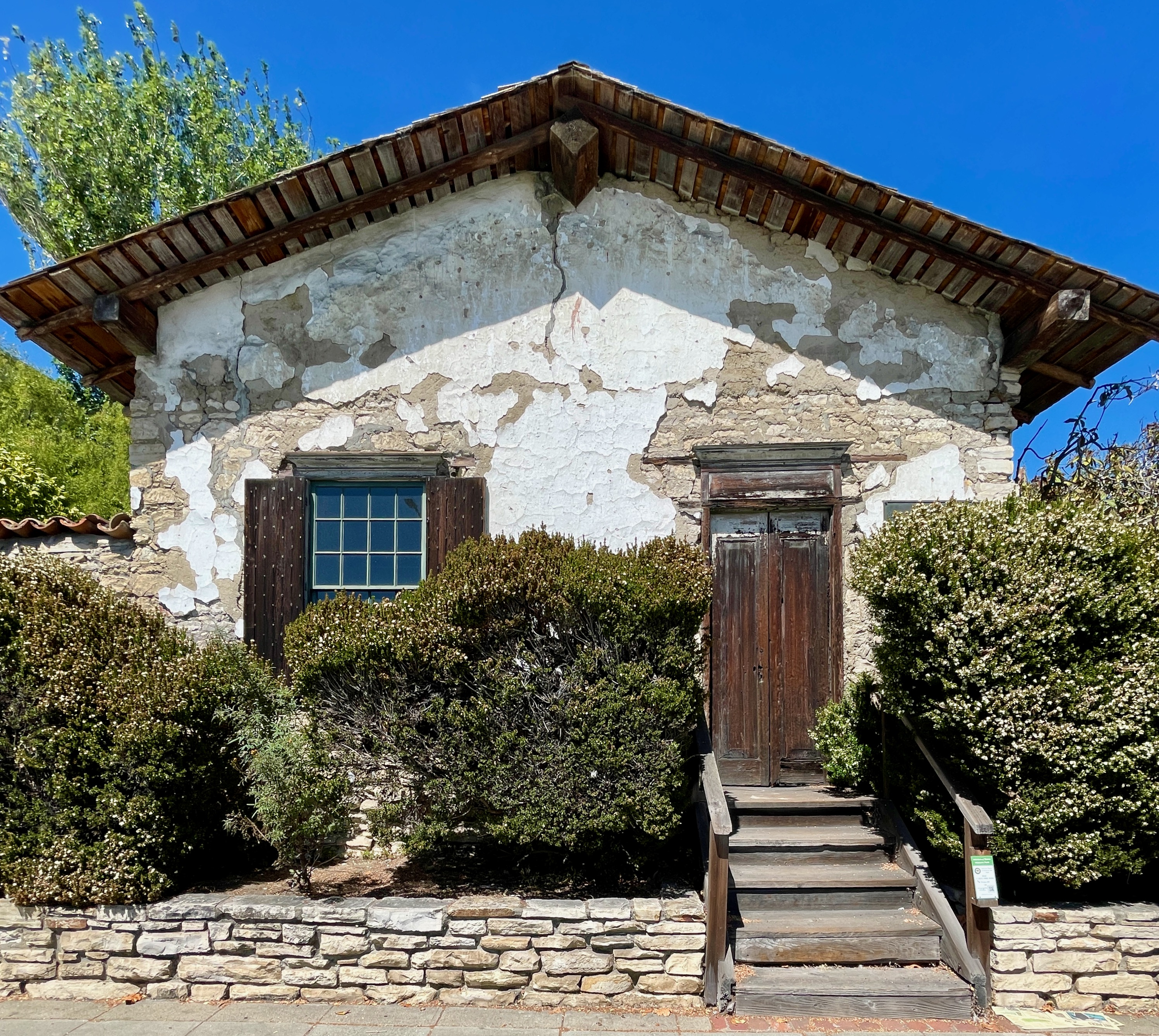
- Sherman Quarters on 510 Calle Principal

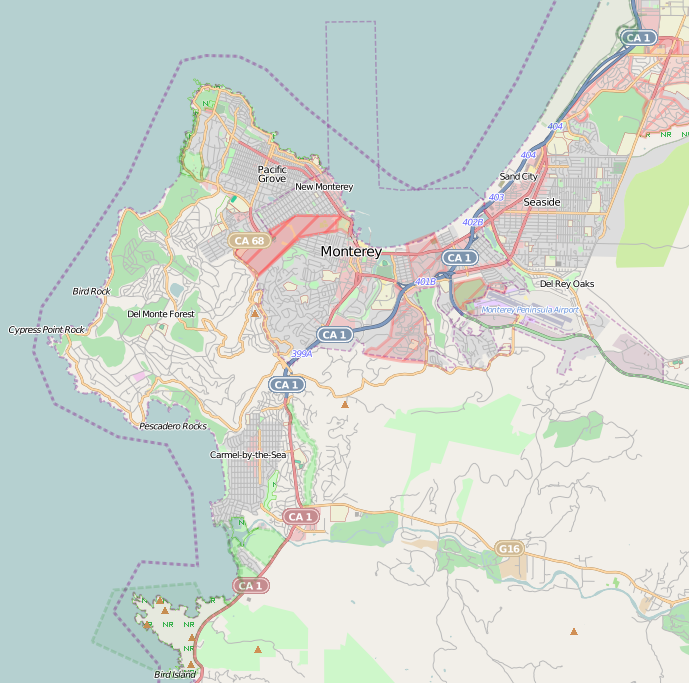
- Location in the Monterey Peninsula
- 36°35′52″N 121°53′46″W
- Location: 510 Calle Principal, Monterey, California

History
- Built: 1834

Site notes
- Website: Sherman Quarters

Sherman Quarters, also known as Sherman Rose House, is a historic adobe stone building located at 510 Calle Principal in Monterey, California. It was built by Thomas O. Larkin in 1834.

It was the quarters for Lieutenant William Tecumseh Sherman in 1847. The building played a role in the U.S. military occupation of California after California's 1846 seizure from Mexico during the Mexican–American War.

== History ==
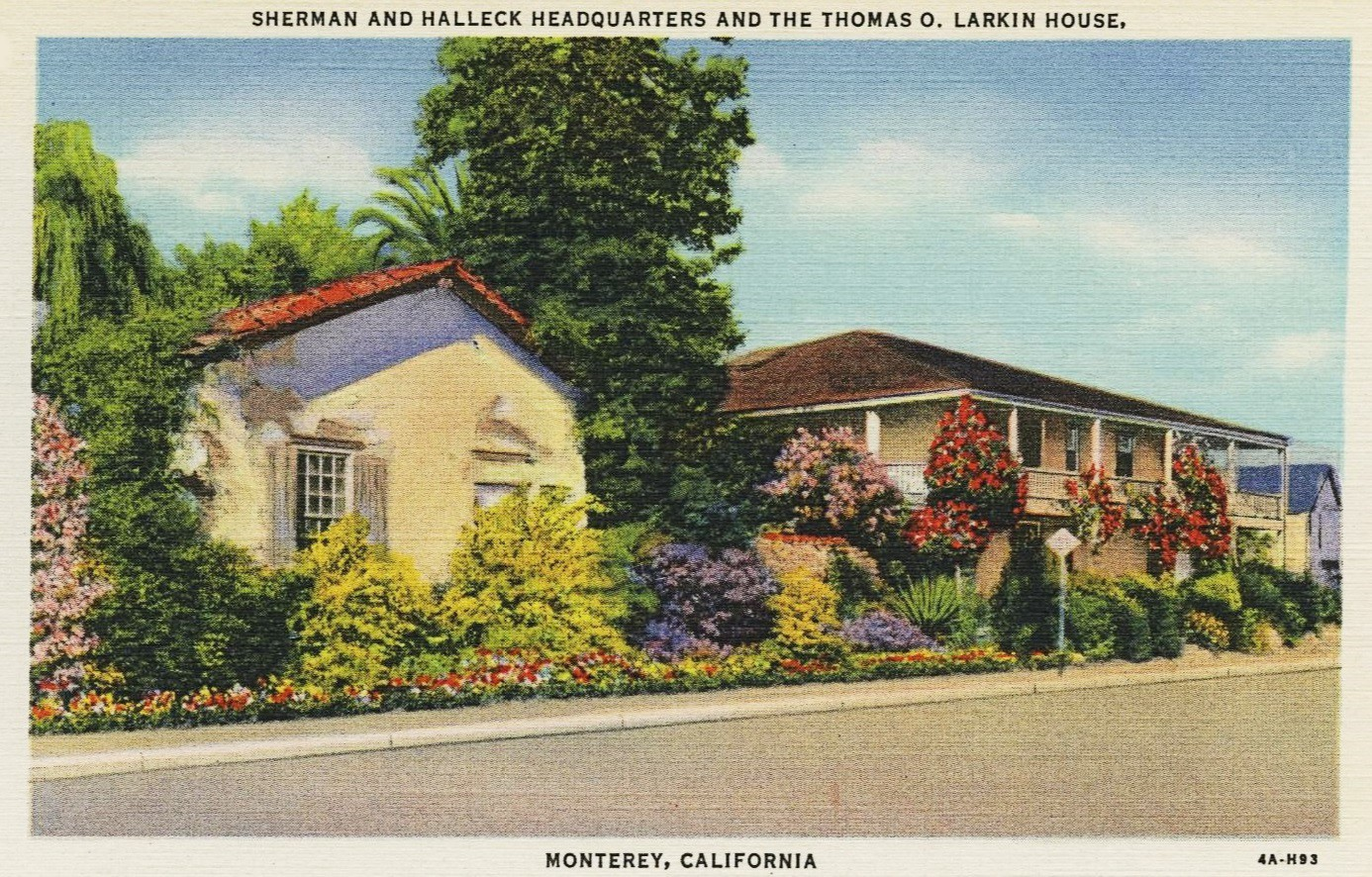
Sherman and Halleck Headquarters and the Larkin House, ca. 1925

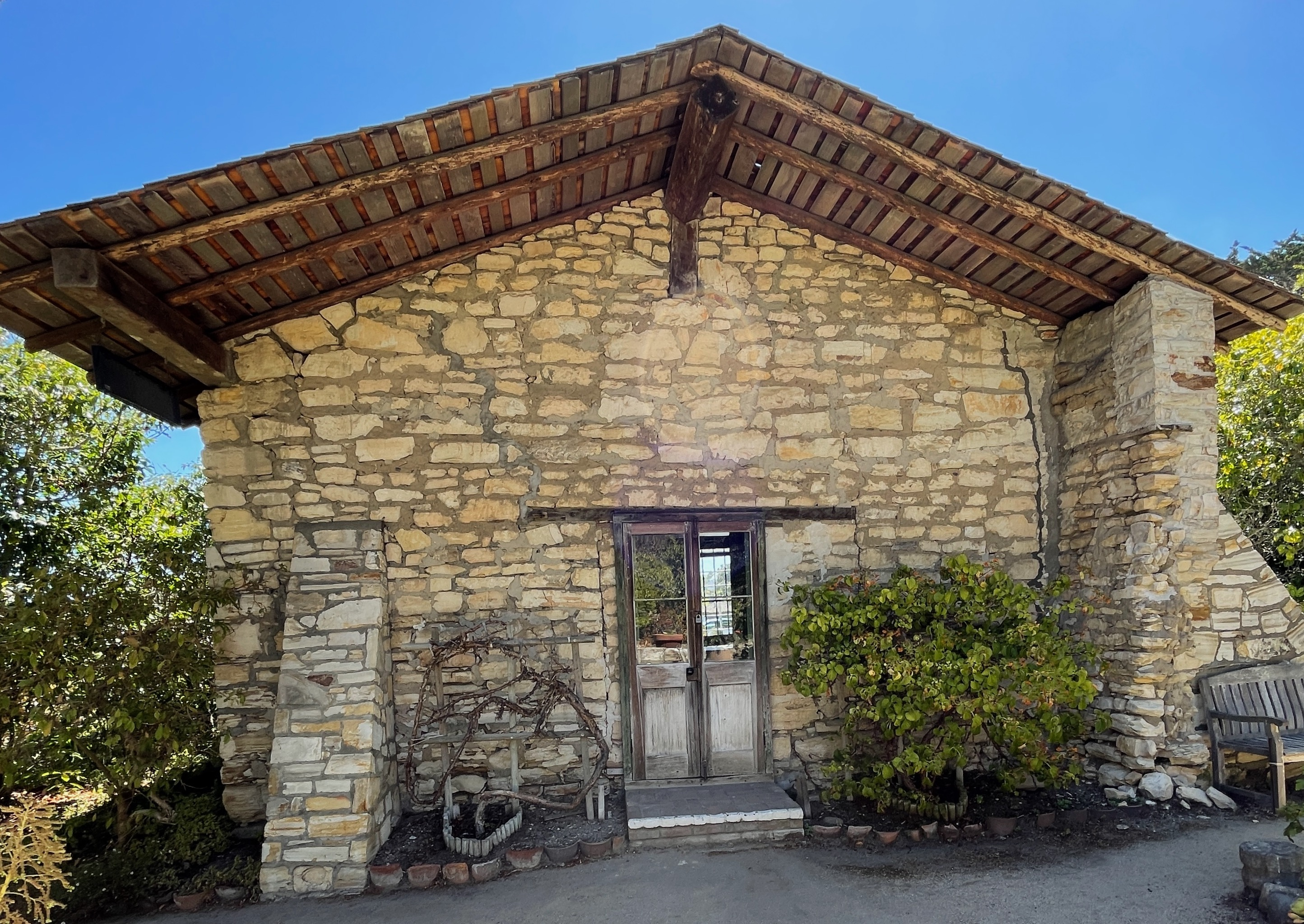
Sherman Quarters entrance

The Sherman Quarters was built in 1834 by diplomat and businessman Thomas O. Larkin. Larkin made his home available as a service to U.S. troops during the U.S. occupation of California. This small adobe building served as headquarters for Lieutenant William Tecumseh Sherman and military secretary of state Henry W. Halleck from 1847 to 1849 while they served under Colonel Richard Barnes Mason, military governor of California before it became a state. Sherman later became famous as a Union general during the American Civil War. The spiked cannon in front of the house was used as a hitching post.

A legend about the house said that Sherman fell in love with Señorita Maria Ygnacia Bonifacio, who lived in the house before his assignment to Monterey in 1847. He gave Maria a rose-tree or "Sherman Rose," with the promise that he would return.

The building was originally part of a large piece of property at Calle Principal between Jefferson and Madison Streets, in Monterey, California. It shares a parcel of land with the Larkin House. In Sherman's memoirs, he talks about the house as the adobe back of Larkin's. The entrance is located in the gardens of the Larkin House. In the 1920s, Larkin's granddaughter, Alice, used it as a tea room.

The one-story building is clad with fieldstone with painted earthen plaster that is now peeling showing the adobe brick beneath. It has an entrance porch, wood steps, wood rail and door. Windows are single, double hung, wood, multipane with shutters. The roof is a front gable, shake roof with open eaves. It has an exterior brick chimney. The small one-room adobe is between the House of the Four Winds and shares a garden with the Larkin House, built in 1834 by Thomas O. Larkin. The Larkin garden has redwoods, palm, and fig trees.

The artist Percy Gray, a California Impressionist, and his wife Leone Phelps, purchased the house in 1923 and renovated it. In 1939, he sold the adobe and moved to San Francisco. The watercolor, Sherman's Quarters, is an example of his work that he did on the Sherman Quarters. The artist Evelyn McCormick also painted the building.

== Historic preservation ==
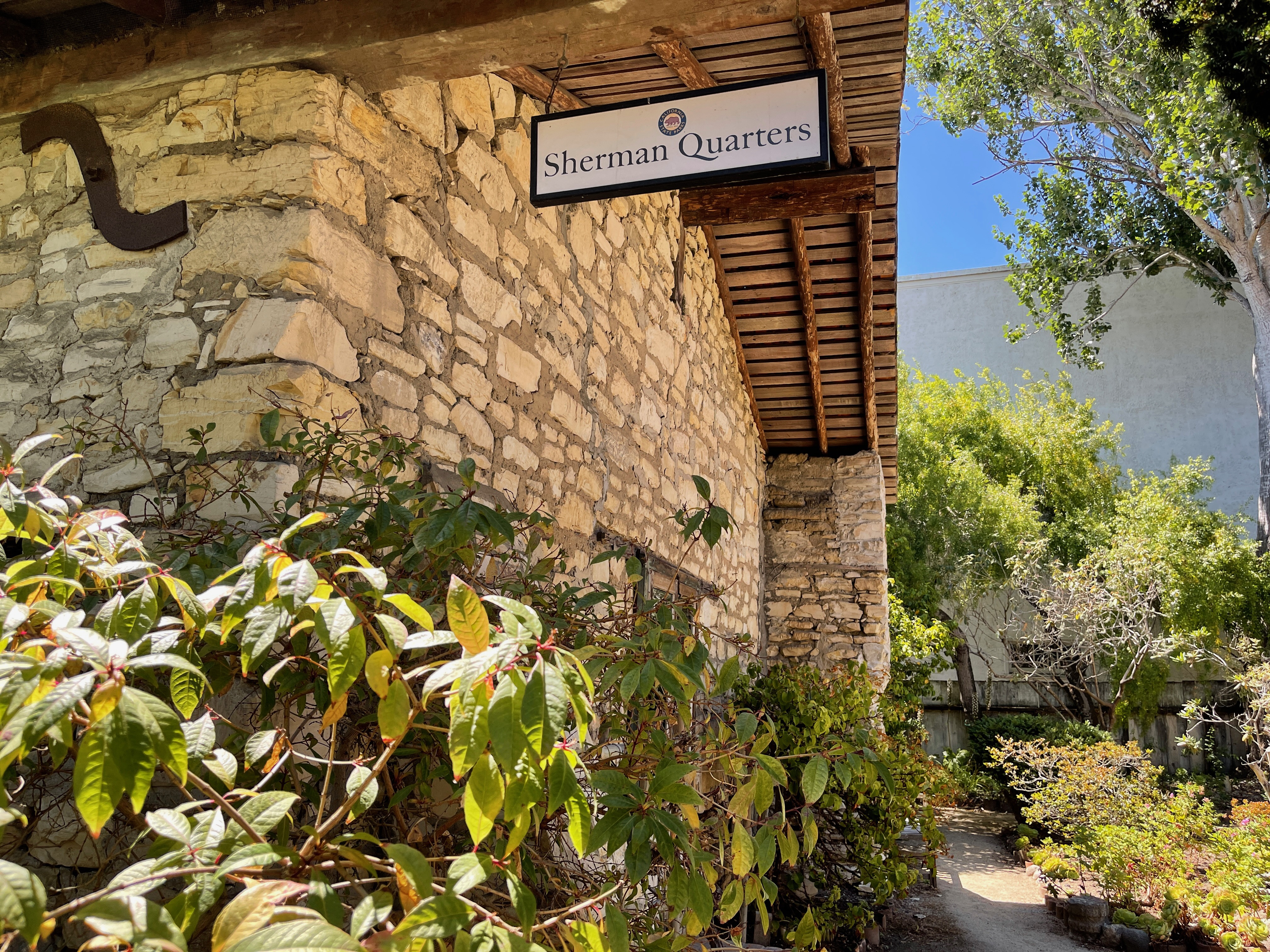
Sherman Quarters sign and entrance located in the gardens of the Larkin House.

The Sherman Quarters was designated as a significant building in the city's Monterey Downtown Area Context Statement and Survey, and was recorded by the Architectural Resources Group, with the Department of Parks and Recreation in June 2011. The building is closed but can be seen when visiting the Larkin House garden.

A historical marker was placed on the wall of the building at 510 Calle Principal. The inscription reads:

Quarters of
General William Tecumseh Sherman
Lieutenant Quartermaster and
Adjutant General
1847 • 1849

== See also ==
- Monterey State Historic Park
- List of the oldest buildings in California
