= List of the oldest buildings in California =

This article lists the oldest extant buildings in California, including extant buildings and structures constructed during Spanish, Mexican, and early American rule over California. Only buildings built prior to 1850 are suitable for inclusion on this list, or the building must be the oldest of its type.

In order to qualify for the list, a structure must:

- be a recognizable building (defined as any human-made structure used or intended for supporting or sheltering any use or continuous occupancy);
- incorporate features of building work from the claimed date to at least 1.5 metres (4.9 ft) in height and/or be a listed building.

This consciously excludes ruins of limited height, roads and statues. Bridges may be included if they otherwise fulfill the above criteria. Dates for many of the oldest structures have been arrived at by radiocarbon dating and should be considered approximate. If the exact year of initial construction is estimated, it will be shown as a range of dates.

== 18th century ==
Building	Image	Location	First built	Use	Notes
Plaza de Los Ángeles		Los Angeles	1781	Plaza	Oldest plaza in California.
Serra Chapel		San Juan Capistrano	1782	Church	Part of Mission San Juan Capistrano. Oldest extant building in California.
El Cuartel		Santa Barbara	1782	Barracks	Part of the Presidio Real de Santa Bárbara. Second oldest extant building in California.
Cañedo Adobe		Santa Barbara	1782	Barracks	Part of the Presidio Real de Santa Bárbara. Third oldest extant building in California.
Ruins of Santa Margarita de Cortona Asistencia		Santa Margarita	1787	Church	Significant portions of the asistencia walls and foundations have been preserved within a large barn owned by Santa Margarita Ranch.
Catalan Forges		San Juan Capistrano	1790s	Bloomery	Part of Mission San Juan Capistrano. Oldest extant metalworking structures in California.
Pablo Pryor Adobe		San Juan Capistrano	1790	Residence	Also known as the Hide House. Presumed to be the oldest extant residence in California. Private residence.
Mission San Francisco de Asís		San Francisco	1791	Church	Oldest building in City of San Francisco. The original chapel, built in 1771, was rebuilt out of adobe from 1782 to 1791.
Cathedral of San Carlos Borromeo		Monterey	1791–94	Cathedral	Part of the Presidio of Monterey. Oldest stone building in California and the second oldest extant cathedral in the United States.
Plaza Hotel		San Juan Bautista	1792	Dormitory	Served as a dormitory, barrack, private residence, and a hotel. A timber second story was added in the late 1850s.
Old Adobe Woman's Club		Santa Clara	1792–1800	Residence	
Ortega-Vigare Adobe		San Gabriel	1792–1805	Residence	
Blas Aguilar Adobe		San Juan Capistrano	1794	Residence	Also known as the Casa de Esperanza.
Montanez Adobe		San Juan Capistrano	1794	Residence	
Rios Adobe		San Juan Capistrano	1794	Residence	
Mission San Diego de Alcalá		San Diego	1795	Church	First Spanish mission in Alta California. The original mission burned down in 1775 and was reconstructed out of adobe from 1776 to 1795.
Branciforte Adobe		Santa Cruz	1797	Residence	The only remaining residence of the Villa de Branciforte.
El Adobe de Capistrano		San Juan Capistrano	1797	Residence	The northern portion of the building was built in 1797. A southern extension was added in 1818.
Mission San Carlos Borromeo de Carmelo		Carmel	1797	Church	The original adobe mission, built in 1771, was rebuilt with quarried stone in 1797.
Luís María Peralta Adobe		San José	1797	Residence	Oldest building in City of San José.
Plaza de César Chávez		San José	1797	Plaza	Oldest plaza in Northern California.
Orella Adobes		near Goleta	1798–1841	Residence	

== 19th century ==
Building	Image	Location	First built	Use	Notes
Ruins of Mission La Purisima		Lompoc	1802	Mission	The original mission was destroyed during the 1812 Ventura earthquake. Only two 7 ft (2.1 m)-high wall fragments and building foundations remains.
Old Mission Dam		San Diego	1803	Dam	First major irrigation project in California.
Mission San Gabriel Arcángel		San Gabriel	1805	Church	The original mission was destroyed by a flood and abandoned in 1776. The church of the present mission dates to 1805.
Great Stone Church		San Juan Capistrano	1806	Church	Part of Mission San Juan Capistrano. It was the only mission church incorporating six vaulted domes in its roof structure.
Casa de Rancho San Antonio		Bell Gardens	1810	Residence	Oldest building in Los Angeles County. Private residence.
Ruins of Mission Nuestra Señora de la Soledad		Soledad	1810	Mission	The mission quadrangle was completed in 1810. A faithful reconstruction of the mission adjacent to the ruins was completed in 1955.
San Antonio de Pala Asistencia		Pala	1810	Church	The mission church dates to 1810.
Simi Adobe		Simi Valley	1810	Residence	
Mission San Buenaventura		Ventura	1812	Church	The original church burned down in 1793 and was rebuilt out of adobe in 1812.
Mission San Antonio de Padua		near Jolon	1813	Church	The original church was rebuilt three times between 1775 and 1813.
Mission San Juan Bautista		San Juan Bautista	1813	Church	The original adobe church was rebuilt and completed in 1813.
Mission San Luis Rey de Francia		Oceanside	1815	Mission	The original church, built in 1798, was rebuilt out of adobe and completed in 1815.
El Molino Viejo		San Marino	1816	Gristmill	Oldest mill and commercial building in Southern California.
Covarrubias Adobe		Santa Barbara	1817	Residence	
Mission Santa Inés		Solvang	1817	Mission	The original mission was severely damaged during the 1812 Ventura earthquake. It was reconstructed with a larger church and rededicated in 1817.
Diego Sepúlveda Adobe		Costa Mesa	1817–23	Residence	Part of an estancia for Mission San Juan Capistrano.
Ávila Adobe		Los Angeles	1818	Residence	Oldest building in the City of Los Angeles.
Mission San Luis Obispo de Tolosa		San Luis Obispo	1818	Mission	The present mission buildings were gradually rebuilt out of adobe and completed in 1818.
Plaza de las Armas		San Diego	1820s	Plaza	
Mission Santa Barbara		Santa Barbara	1820	Mission	The mission was rebuilt four times between 1786 and 1820.
Casa de Carrillo		San Diego	1821	Residence	Oldest residence in San Diego.
Mission San Miguel Arcángel		San Miguel	1821	Church	The original church burned down in 1806 and was rebuilt out of adobe from 1816 to 1821.
Convento Building		Los Angeles	1822	Convent	The adobe convent is the only original building left of Mission San Fernando Rey de España.
Neary-Rodriguez Adobe		Santa Cruz	1822–24	Dormitory	The adobe dormitory for Native American residents is the only original building left of Mission Santa Cruz.
Cooper-Molera Adobe		Monterey	1823	Residence	
Mission La Purísima Concepción		Lompoc	1823	Mission	The original mission was destroyed during the 1812 Ventura earthquake. The present mission was completed within 10 years of being rededicated in 1813.
Rancho Santa Maria de Los Peñasquitos		San Diego	1823	Residence	
Rafael Gonzalez House		Santa Barbara	1825	Residence	
Hill–Carrillo Adobe		Santa Barbara	1825–26	Residence	
Dominguez Rancho Adobe		Compton	1826	Residence	
Casa de Estudillo		San Diego	1827	Residence	
Old Monterey Custom House		Monterey	1827	Custom house	Oldest government building in California. Served as the only port of entry to Alta California.
Casa de Bandini		San Diego	1827–29	Residence	The adobe first floor was built between 1827 and 1829. The building was later expanded during the 1840s and 1870s.
Casa de la Guerra		Santa Barbara	1828	Residence	
Mission Santa Clara de Asís		Santa Clara	1828	Mission	The mission was relocated and rebuilt several times between 1777 and 1828.
Catalina Verdugo Adobe		Glendale	1828–30s	Residence	The estimated date of construction ranges from 1828 to the 1830s.
House of the Four Winds		Monterey	1830s	Residence	
Los Feliz Adobe		Los Angeles	1830s	Residence	The adobe residence serves as the headquarters for Griffith Park.
Juan de Anza House		San Juan Bautista	1830	Residence	
Saint Francis of Assisi Chapel		Warner Springs	1830	Church	
Governor Alvarado House		Monterey	1831	Residence	
Plaza de Yerba Buena		San Francisco	1833	Plaza	
Rómulo Pico Adobe		Los Angeles	1834	Residence	Also known as the Andrés Pico Adobe.
Camilo Ynitia Adobe		Novato	1834	Residence	The ruins of the residence are located within a wood shingle shelter.
Centinela Adobe		Inglewood	1834	Residence	Oldest building in the City of Inglewood.
Sherman Quarters		Monterey	1834	Residence	Built as a private residence in 1834. Briefly served as the quarters of Lieutenant William T. Sherman following the Conquest of California in 1847.
La Casa de Lopez		San Diego	1835	Residence	
La Casa de Machado y Stewart		San Diego	1835	Residence	
Larkin House		Monterey	1835	Residence	
Ríos-Caledonia Adobe		San Miguel	1835	Residence	
Salvio Pacheco Adobe		Concord	1835	Residence	
Sonoma Plaza		Sonoma	1835	Plaza	
Rancho Petaluma Adobe		Petaluma	1835–57	Residence	Largest building constructed during Mexican rule in California. Part of the Presidio of Sonoma.
Blue Wing Inn		Sonoma	1836	Residence	Constructed as a private residence in 1836. The property was expanded into a hotel and saloon in 1848.
Roberto-Suñol Adobe		San José	1836	Residence	
Robert Louis Stevenson House		Monterey	1836	Residence	
Rotchev House		near Jenner	1836	Residence	Part of Fort Ross, the only Russian colonial settlement in California.
Salvador Vallejo Adobe		Sonoma	1836–46	Residence	
Dana Adobe		Nipomo	1837	Residence	
La Casa Primera de Rancho San Jose		Pomona	1837	Residence	
Jose Maria Alviso Adobe		Milpitas	1837	Residence	
Olivas Adobe		Ventura	1837	Residence	The original adobe was enlarged in 1849.
Sonoma Barracks		Sonoma	1837–41	Barracks	Part of the Presidio of Sonoma.
José Castro House		San Juan Bautista	1838–41	Residence	
Hugo Reid Adobe		Arcadia	1839	Residence	
Berryessa Adobe		Santa Clara	1840s	Residence	
Casa Soberanes		Monterey	1840s	Residence	
La Casa de Machado y Silvas		San Diego	1840s	Residence	
La Casa Alvarado		Pomona	1840	Residence	
Los Alamos Ranch House		Los Alamos	1840	Residence	
Moraga Adobe		Orinda	1841	Residence	Oldest residence in Contra Costa County.
Vallejo's Chapel		Sonoma	1841	Mission	Part of Mission San Francisco Solano. The original wooden chapel, built in 1824, was rebuilt out of adobe in 1841.
Sutter's Fort		Sacramento	1841–43	Fort	First European colonial settlement in the Central Valley.
Peña Adobe		Vacaville	1842	Residence	
Yucaipa Adobe		Yucaipa	1842	Residence	
Casa Dolores		Santa Barbara	1843	Residence	Oldest extant two-story adobe in the City of Santa Barbara.
Richardson Adobe		near Soledad	1843	Residence	
Casa Gutiérrez Adobe		Monterey	1844	Residence	
Leonis Adobe		Calabasas	1844	Residence	
Los Cerritos Ranch House		Long Beach	1844	Residence	
Warner's Ranch		Warner Springs	1844–46	Residence	
Jose Eusebio Boronda Adobe		Salinas	1844–48	Residence	
Casa del Oro		Monterey	1845	General store	Also known as the Joseph Boston Store.
Cayetano Juarez Adobe		Napa	1845	Residence	
Moreno Adobe		Jurupa Valley	1845	Residence	Oldest extant structure in Riverside County. Located within Santa Rosa Plateau Ecological Reserve.
Adobe Flores		South Pasadena	1846	Residence	
Bale Grist Mill		Napa	1846	Gristmill	One of only two extant water-driven mills in the western United States.
Sánchez Adobe		Pacifica	1846	Residence	A two-story adobe believed to have been partially constructed using bricks from the nonextant San Pedro y San Pablo Asistencia.
California's First Theatre		Monterey	1846–47	Theatre	Oldest theatre in California. Built as a tavern in 1846–47. Converted to a theatre in 1850.
First Brick House		Monterey	1847	Residence	First brick building constructed in California.
Nash-Patton Adobe		Sonoma	1847	Residence	
Officers’ Club		San Francisco	1847	Officers' club	Adobe walls dating to the construction of the Presideo in the 1790s were incorporated into the front wings of the building.
Pacific House		Monterey	1847	Storehouse	Weapons storehouse built by the US Army following the Conquest of California. This building is a California Historical Landmark (#354).
Old Whaling Station		Monterey	1847	Residence	Built as a residence in 1847. Converted to the headquarters of the Monterey Whaling Company in 1855.
Colton Hall		Monterey	1847–49	Government	First seat of government of the U.S. state of California.
Jose Joaquin Castro Adobe		Watsonville	1848–49	Residence	Only two-story hacienda ever built in Santa Cruz County.
Vicente Martínez Adobe		near Martinez	1849	Residence	
Los Encinos De La Osa Adobe		Los Angeles	1849–50	Residence	
Chapel of the Immaculate Conception		San Diego	1850	Residence	Also known as the Old Adobe Church. Dedicated as a parish church in 1856.
Reyes Adobe		Agoura Hills	1850	Residence	
Union Square		San Francisco	1850	Plaza	
William Heath Davis House		San Diego	1850	Residence	Also known as the Davis-Horton House.
Benicia Capitol		Benicia	1852	City hall	Oldest extant city hall in California.
Mariposa County Courthouse		Mariposa	1854	Courthouse	Oldest courthouse in California.
Point Pinos Lighthouse		Pacific Grove	1855	Lighthouse	Oldest lighthouse on the West Coast.
National Exchange Hotel		Nevada City	1856	Hotel	Oldest continuously operated hotel on the West Coast.
Old Bidwell Bar Bridge		Oroville	1856	Bridge	First suspension bridge built in California. The bridge was relocated in 1966 prior to the creation of Lake Oroville.
Buena Vista Winery		Sonoma	1857	Winery	Oldest commercial winery in California.
Whaley House		San Diego	1857	Residence, Courthouse & Pharmacy	Oldest brick structure in Southern California.
Fort Point		San Francisco	1861	Fort	The only extant Third System fortification in the western United States.
Bridgeport Covered Bridge		Penn Valley	1862	Bridge	Oldest covered bridge in California & longest wooden covered bridge in the world.
Menlo Park station		Menlo Park	1867	Train station	Oldest train station in California.
San Buenaventura Pier		Ventura	1870	Pier	Oldest pier in California.
Weaverville Joss House		Weaverville	1874	Taoist temple	Oldest continuously operating Taoist temple in California.
Temple Beth Israel		San Diego	1889	Synagogue	Tied with Temple Beth Sholom for the oldest extant synagogue in California.
Temple Beth Sholom		San Leandro	1889	Synagogue	Tied with Temple Beth Israel for the oldest extant synagogue in California.
Old Chronicle Building		San Francisco	1890	Office	First skyscraper in California.
Pope Street Bridge		St. Helena	1894	Bridge	Oldest stone arch bridge in California.

== 20th century ==
Building	Image	Location	First built	Use	Notes
Vedanta Society Old Temple		San Francisco	1905	Hindu temple	The third floor and towers were added in 1908. Oldest Hindu temple in the United States.
Santa Cruz Beach Boardwalk		Santa Cruz	1907	Amusement park	Oldest extant amusement park in California. The park operates the Giant Dipper, the oldest roller coaster in California.
Minor Theater		Arcata	1914	Movie theater	Oldest purpose-built movie theater in the United States.
Tassajara Zen Mountain Center		Carmel	1967	Monastery	Oldest Japanese Buddhist Sōtō Zen monastery in the United States, and the first Zen monastery established outside of Asia.

== See also ==
- National Register of Historic Places listings in California
- Spanish missions in California
- History of California
- Oldest buildings in the United States
