= Casa Soberanes =

Historic house museum in Monterey, California

Coordinates: 36°36′5″N 121°53′45″W

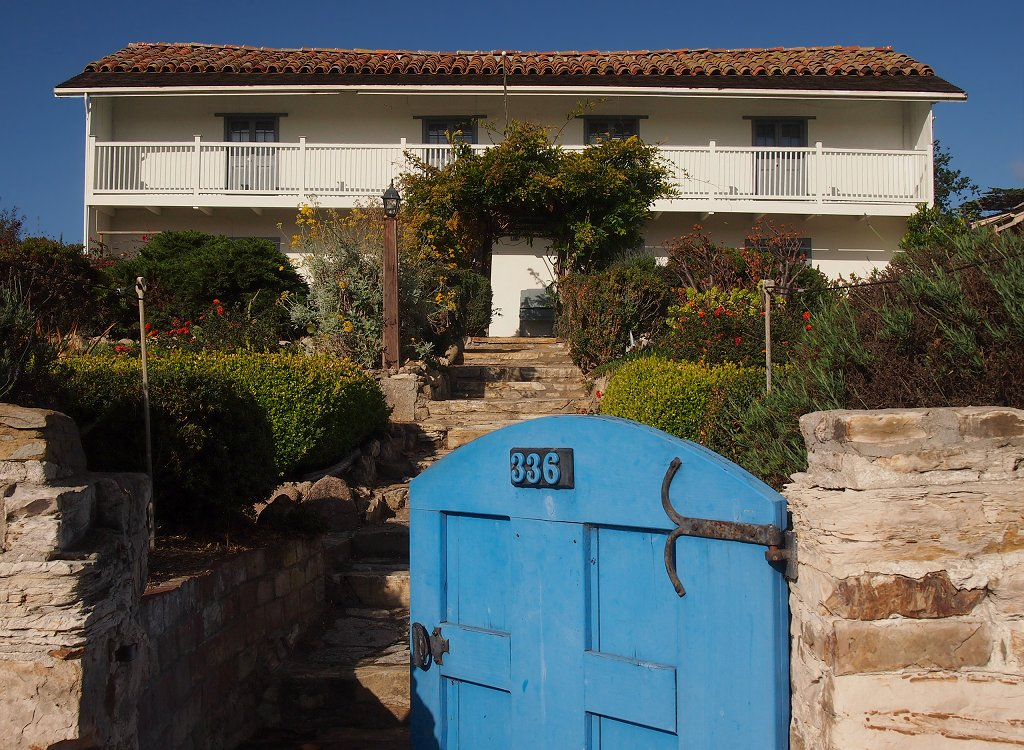

Casa Soberanes is a historic adobe residence located in downtown Monterey, California. Designated California Historical Landmark No. 712, it is also included along Monterey's "Path of History," a walking route highlighting the city's significant historic sites. The property is currently operated as a historic house museum by Monterey State Historic Park.

Built in 1842 by Custom House official Rafael Estrada, the two-story structure is an example of a Monterey Colonial style adobe. The building is noted for its symmetrical façade and a roof made of both clay tiles and shingles—an adaptation required because the second-floor balcony lacks posts to support heavy tiles beyond the thick adobe walls.

Estrada sold the property in 1860 to his cousin Esequiel Soberanes, who used it as a town residence away from his Big Sur rancho. The Soberanes family lived in the home until 1922, hosting business meetings, social gatherings, and raising most of their thirteen children within its walls. Jean Booth and Reuben Serrano later purchased and restored the building during the 1920s and 1930s. It is during their tenure that the house became known as "The House of the Blue Gate" due to the vivid color of the front garden gate.

In 1952, writer and local historian Mayo Hayes O'Donnell purchased the house from Jean Booth after leasing it for 11 years. Booth furnished the home with Monterey antiques, some of which remained with the building when she sold it to O'Donnell. A prominent advocate for preserving Monterey's historic adobes, O'Donnell gifted the property to the State of California in 1954, although she continued to live there until her death in January of 1978.

Its garden is distinguished by decorative elements such as whale bones, wine bottles, and abalone shells bordering its pathways. Today, the adobe stands as a key example of Monterey's preserved architectural heritage. Along with the building, O'Donnell's art collection, which included gifts from local artists, is still on display and includes pieces by notable artists including Chiura Obata, Charles Bradford Hudson, Xavier Martinez, Lionel Barrymore, and Donald Teague.

The gardens are free and open during daylight hours. The house is open during special events and can also be viewed via private tour.
