= Mary C. W. Black Studio House =

Historic house in California, United States

- U.S. National Register of Historic Places
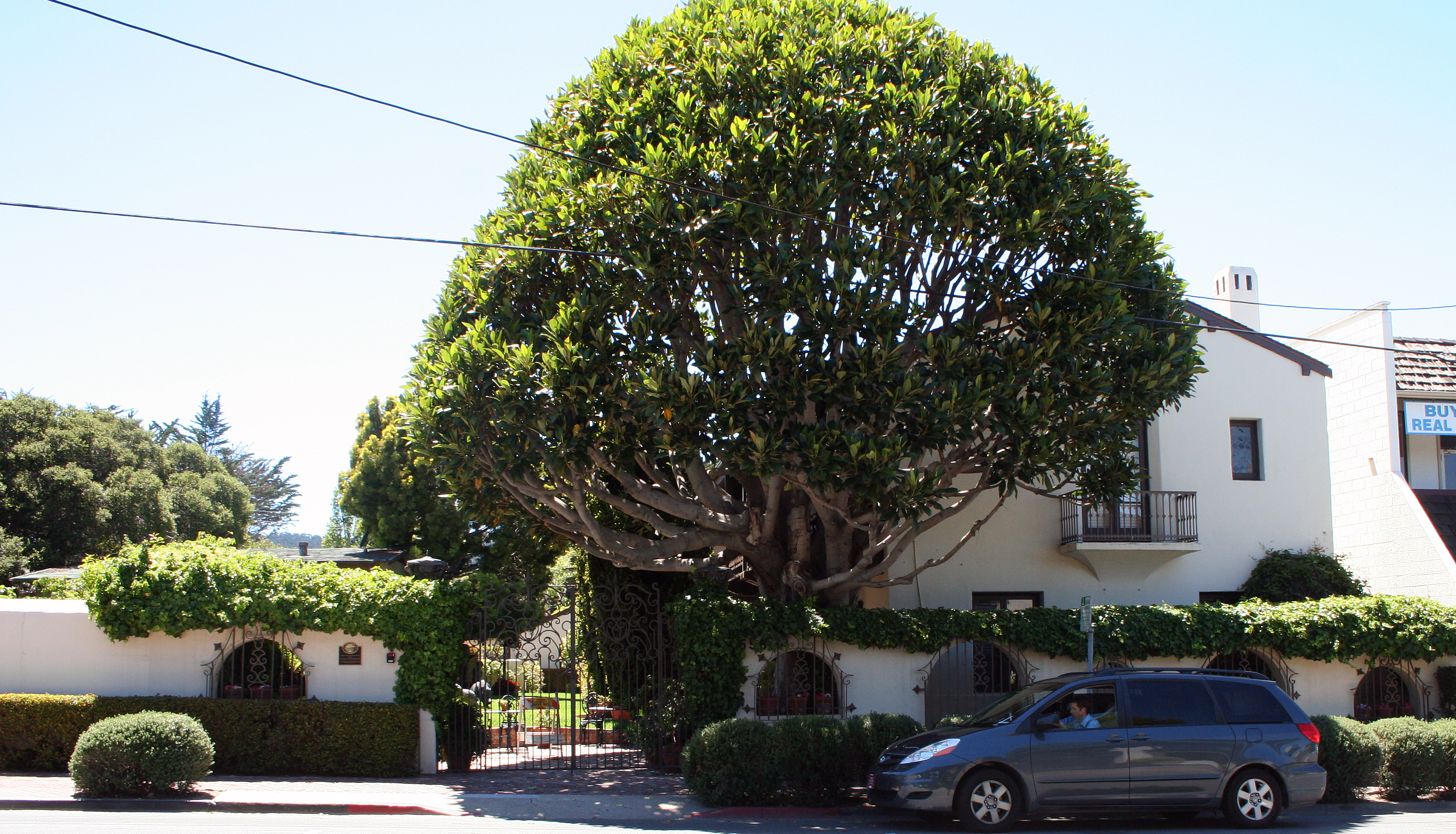

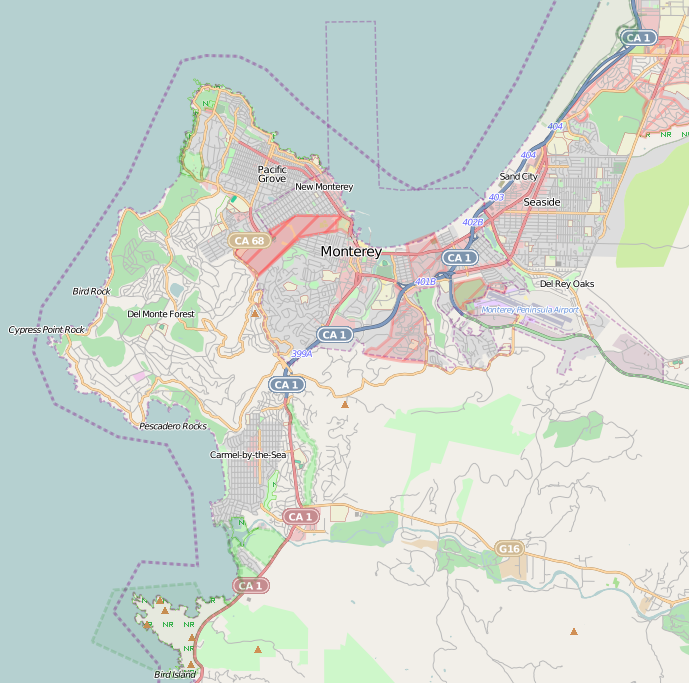
- Location within Monterey Peninsula Location within California Location within the United States
- Location: 556 Abrego St., Monterey, California
- Coordinates: 36°35′49″N 121°53′30″W
- Area: less than one acre
- Built: 1930
- Built by: Ruthven, Sidney
- Architect: Black, Mary C. W.
- Architectural style: Mission/Spanish Revival, Monterey Revival
- NRHP reference No.: 94001007
- Added to NRHP: August 24, 1994

The Mary C. W. Black Studio House, located at 556 Abrego St. in Monterey, California, is a historic house and artist's studio that is listed on the National Register of Historic Places. It was purchased in 1925 by Monterey artist Mary Corning Winslow Black (1873–1943), who completed her redesign of the old adobe in 1930, including the addition of "sumptuous gardens." It is an example of eclectic architecture including Mission/Spanish Revival architecture and its substyle of Monterey architecture.

The house is significant as one of surprisingly "few good residential examples of the Monterey substyle of the Spanish Colonial Revival on the Monterey peninsula, where the form was originated", and in particular one of only three examples known in 1993 to have a "full width cantilevered second-story balcony, covered by the principal roof."

According to its NRHP nomination, "Mrs. Black's 'old-new' studio house was praised in the September 27, 1930 Monterey Peninsula Herald for its 'impression of permanancy...' and 'appearance of age'. The article noted that the 'modern structures with the appearance of antiquity blend with the ancient adobe (Casa Abrego) that retains still its original charm... and that the work had resulted in one of the peninsula's outstanding beauty spots'." And that the house had been very well preserved since then.

The property was listed on the National Register in 1994. The listing included two contributing buildings and two contributing objects, plus a non-contributing building (a gardener's shed used as an office that had lost its historic integrity).
