= John Larkin (Deacon of Charlestown) =

- Born: April 3, 1735; Charlestown, Province of Massachusetts
- Died: December 14, 1807; Charlestown, Massachusetts
- Other names: First Congregational Church
- Spouse: Ruth Kettell
- Children: Ruth Larkin
- Parent(s): Samuel Larkin, Mary Hicks
- Church: First Church of Charlestown
- Congregations served: Charlestown
- Title: Deacon

Deacon John Larkin (April 3, 1735 – December 14, 1807) was an ordained minister of the First Congregational Church in his hometown of Charlestown, Massachusetts. He was also a merchant, in the tea trade, for the East India Company, having in his possession chests of tea that he readily concealed to avoid England's Stamp Tax. John Larkin is most notable for aiding Paul Revere to obtain the horse he used in his "Midnight Ride". The horse, Brown Beauty was owned by John's father, Samuel Larkin. John Larkin's will is among Charlestown Records. He amassed a large fortune before he died in 1807. His estate was probated for $86,381.99.

== Aiding Paul Revere ==
On April 17, 1775, British troops were dispatched by Governor General Sir Thomas Gage to seize weaponry held by suspected rebels. Paul Revere and Richard Devens combined efforts with John Larkin, to borrow his father's large horse in order to deliver intelligence to the towns of Menotomy (now Arlington) and Lexington. Genealogist William Ensign Lincoln, recorded a Larkin family tradition that the horse was a mare named "Brown Beauty" belonging to Samuel Larkin, John Larkin's father. According to Lincoln, in 1930, he wrote: "The mare was borrowed at the request of Samuel's son, Deacon John Larkin, and was never returned to the owner."

During the Battle of Bunker Hill, some British troops marched through the Boston suburb of Charlestown, Massachusetts, where the Larkin families lived. John's brother, Ebenezer Larkin (1740-1794), fired a musket from a window of his home at the British troops, who in reprisal, burned the Larkin homes to the ground. John Larkin and his family fled, unscathed, to Cambridge, where they lived in a house once occupied by General Washington and later by Henry Wadsworth Longfellow.

== Larkin genealogy ==
John Larkin was the son of Samuel Larkin (1701-1784) and Mary Hicks (1700-1751). John married Ruth Kettell (1738-1816), daughter of Deacon William and Ruth (Stimpson) Kettell by whom he had ten children. The First Church of Charlestown contains baptisms and marriages of the Larkin family. The Larkin family resided in Charlestown as early as 1634, descendants of Edward Larking, an English settler of the Massachusetts Bay Colony.

- Edward Larking (c. 1615 - c. 1652), English immigrant
  - John Larkin (1640 - 1678) m. Joanna Hale (1646 - 1694)
    - Edward Larkin (1668 - 1738) m. Mary Walker (1670 - 1734)
      - Samuel Larkin (1701 - 1784) m. Mary Hicks (1700 - 1751)
        - Dea. John Larkin (1735 - 1807) m. Ruth Kettell (1738 - 1816)
John Larkin Family Tree

== See also ==
- Old North Church
- Paul Revere
- Paul Revere's Ride (poem)
- American Revolution
- Province of Massachusetts Bay
- Suffolk County, Massachusetts
- Thomas O. Larkin, John Larkin's grandson

== Sources ==
- Weckle, Paul J. "The Webb Ancestry of Austin Parker Webb and All His Connected Families". P.J. Weckle, 1987; p. 250
- Waters, Henry Fritz-Gilbert. "The New England Historical and Genealogical Register". New England Historic Genealogical Society, 1875; p. 71
- Fischer, David Hackett. "Paul Revere's Ride". Oxford University Press, 1995. ISBN 0-19-509831-5, ISBN 978-0-19-509831-0; p. 389
- Frothingham, Richard. "The History of Charlestown, Massachusetts". C.P. Emmons, 1845; p. 315-16
- Lincoln, Lincoln & Fisher. "In Memoriam: John Larkin Lincoln, 1817-1891". Houghton, Mifflin & Co., 1894; p. 619
- Whittier, Charles Collyer. "Genealogy of the Stimpson Family of Charlestown, Mass., and Allied Lines". Press of D. Clapp & Son, 1907; p. 23
