= House of the Four Winds =

California Historical Landmark in Monterey County

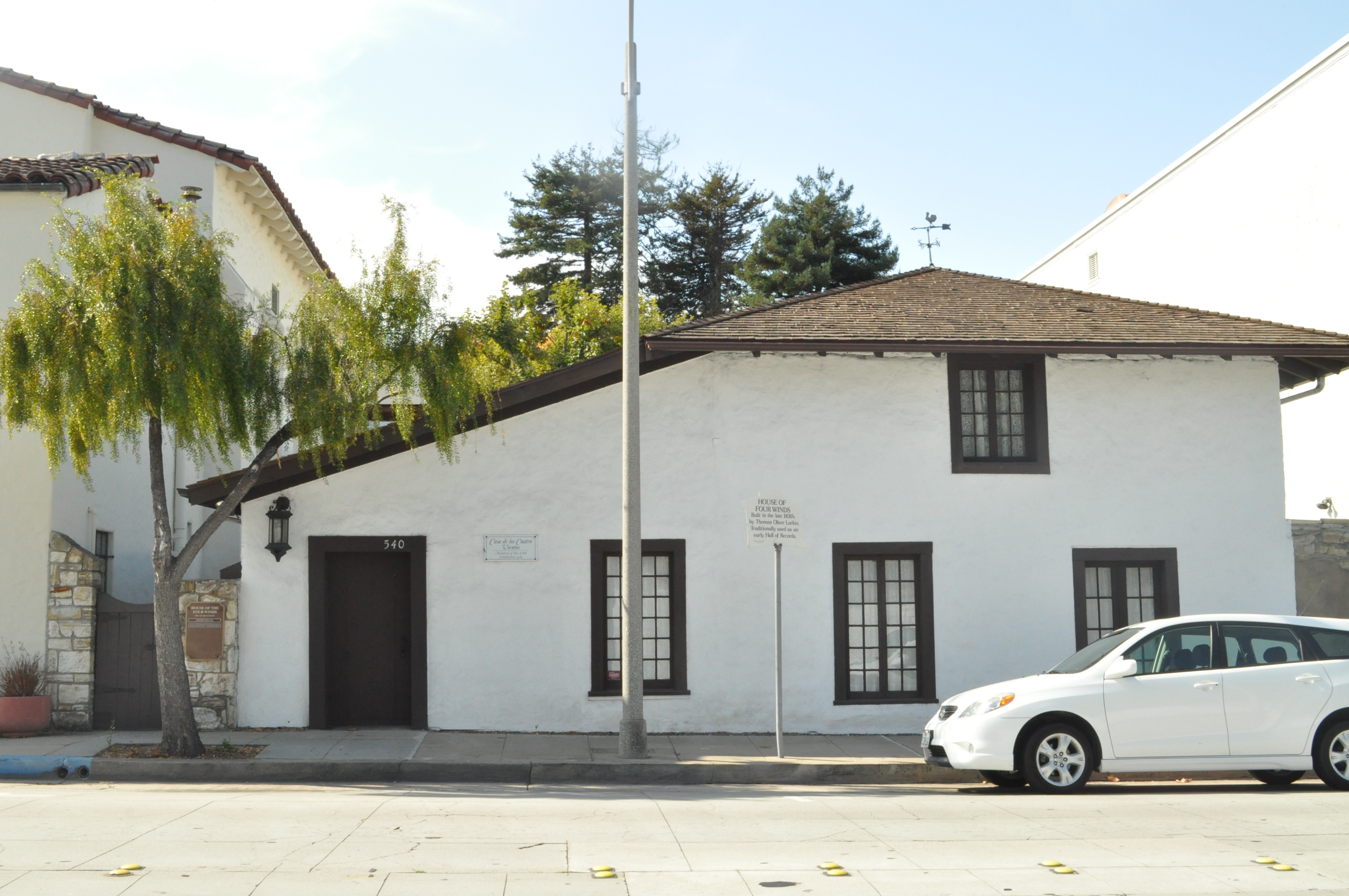
- The House Of the Four Winds

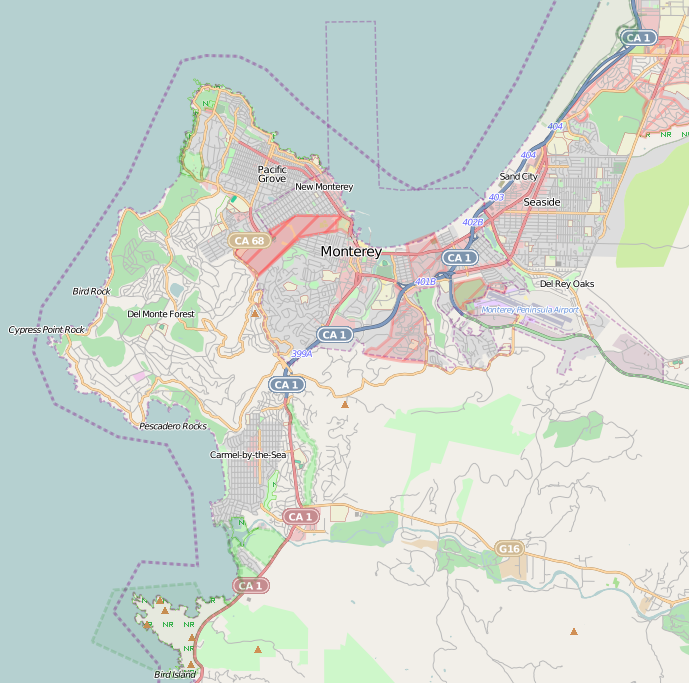
- Location in the Monterey Peninsula
- 36°35′52″N 121°53′46″W
- Location: 540 Calle Principal, Monterey, California

History
- Built: circa 1834 or 1840

Site notes
- Architectural style: Adobe/Spanish Colonial
- Website: noehill.com/monterey/cal0353.asp

California Historical Landmark
- Designated: October 9, 1939
- Reference no.: 353

The House of the Four Winds, or La Casa de Los Vientos, is a historic adobe building located at 540 Calle Principal in Monterey, California. It was built by Thomas O. Larkin in 1834 (or 1840). The house acquired its named because of the weather vane on its hipped roof. The building was used as the first State of California Hall of Records. Today it is used as the clubhouse for the Monterey Civic Club. The building is listed as a California Historical Landmark #353.

== History ==
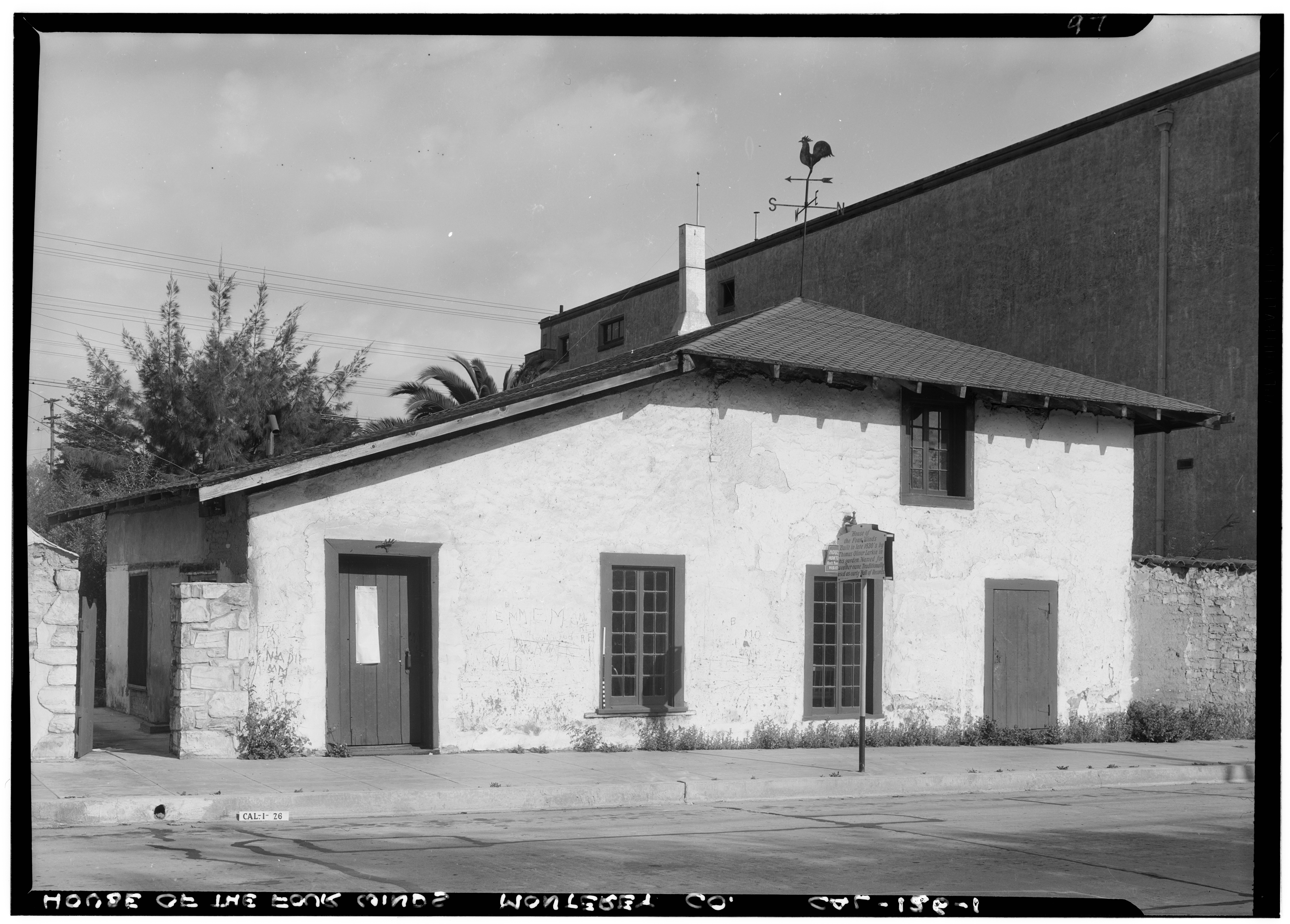
House of the Four Winds, 540 Calle Principal, May 13, 1936

The one-and-half-story adobe home in Monterey was named The House of the Four Winds (originally La Casa de Los Vientos) because it was the first house in Monterey with a weather vane on its hipped roof. Built in either 1835 or 1840, the adobe was originally part of a large piece of property at Calle Principal between Jefferson and W. Franklin Streets, in Monterey, California. It was built by diplomat and businessman Thomas O. Larkin and used by him as a store.

It later served as headquarters for Henry Halleck, Secretary of State. After the Mexican–American War, the building was first used as a residence by the Spanish Governor of Alta California Juan Bautista Alvarado. In 1846, William S. Johnson designated it as the first State of California Hall of Records for the newly formed County of Monterey. Johnson had his office and home in the building.

The House of the Four Winds is a historic white plastered adobe Spanish Colonial-style building that was next door to the county sheriff's office and the court house. There is a stone perimeter wall at the sidewalk next to it. The windows and doors are painted green and under the roof is a hand hewn beam.

== Historic preservation ==
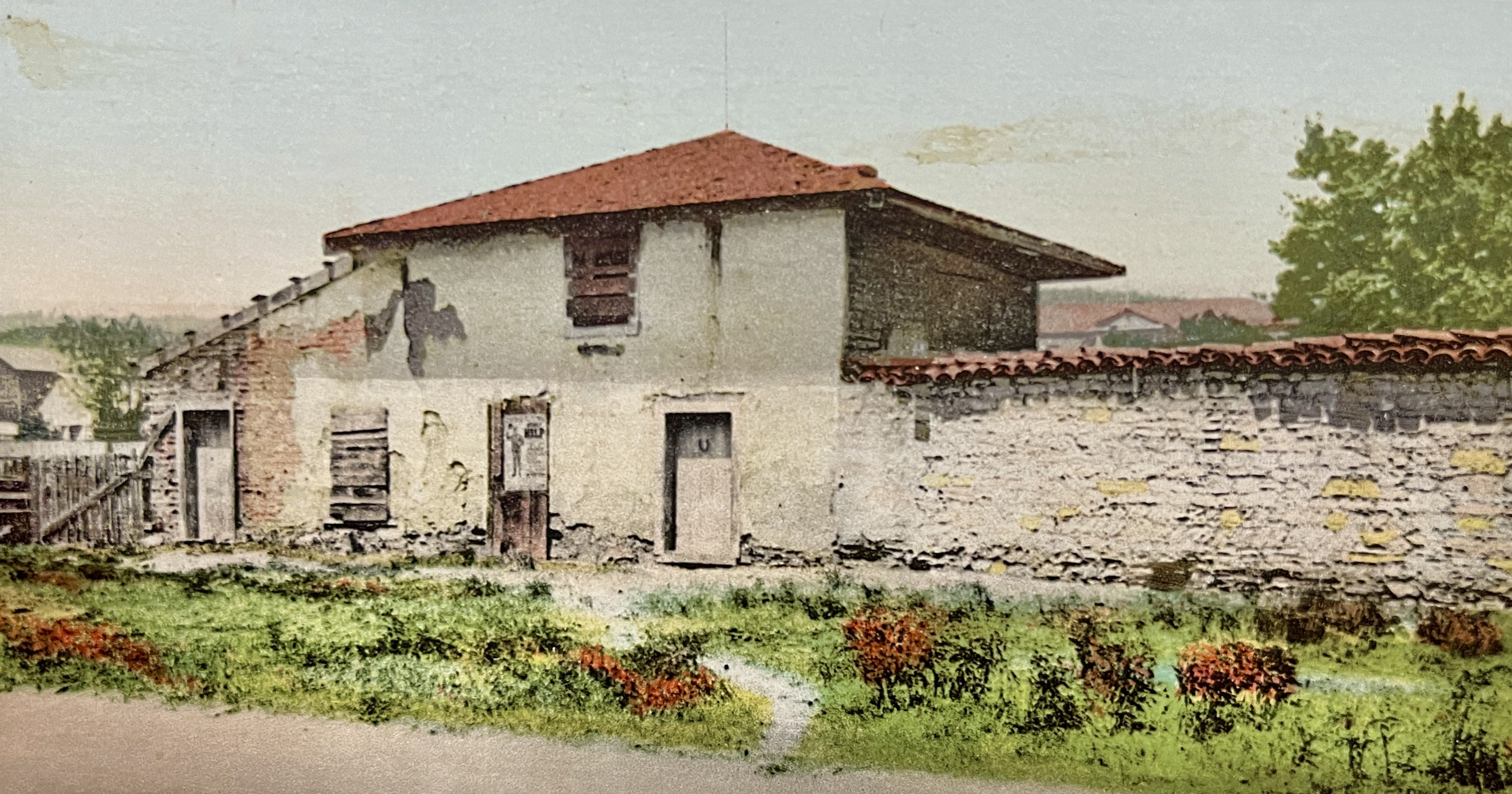
House of Four Winds, Monterey, California, 1902.

One of the first group to encourage the preservation of Monterey's adobes was the Women's Civic Club (WCC), founded in 1906. The House of the Four Winds is a landmark that the WCC was determined should not disappear. They purchased the adobe in 1914 and transformed it into their clubhouse, which is the oldest clubhouse in the United States. The original front section and second story have been restored and furnished in the style at the time of the 1850s. On March 14, 1914, the WCC held a meeting to arrange, with the owner, for the transfer of The House of the Four Winds property. The historic house became the 353 California Historical Landmark on October 9, 1939.

Today, the WCC has monthly programs with speakers about topics of interest, and participate in civic events. They help preserve and maintain the historic adobe. The mission of the club is to improve, beautify and promote the welfare of Monterey and to help preserve its history.

House of the Four Winds was recorded by the Architectural Resources Group as a historical building and an application was submitted to the Department of Parks and Recreation in January 2011.

== See also ==
- California Historical Landmarks in Monterey County
- Monterey State Historic Park
- List of the oldest buildings in California
