= Thomas O. Larkin =

American businessman and diplomat (1802–1858)

Thomas Oliver Larkin
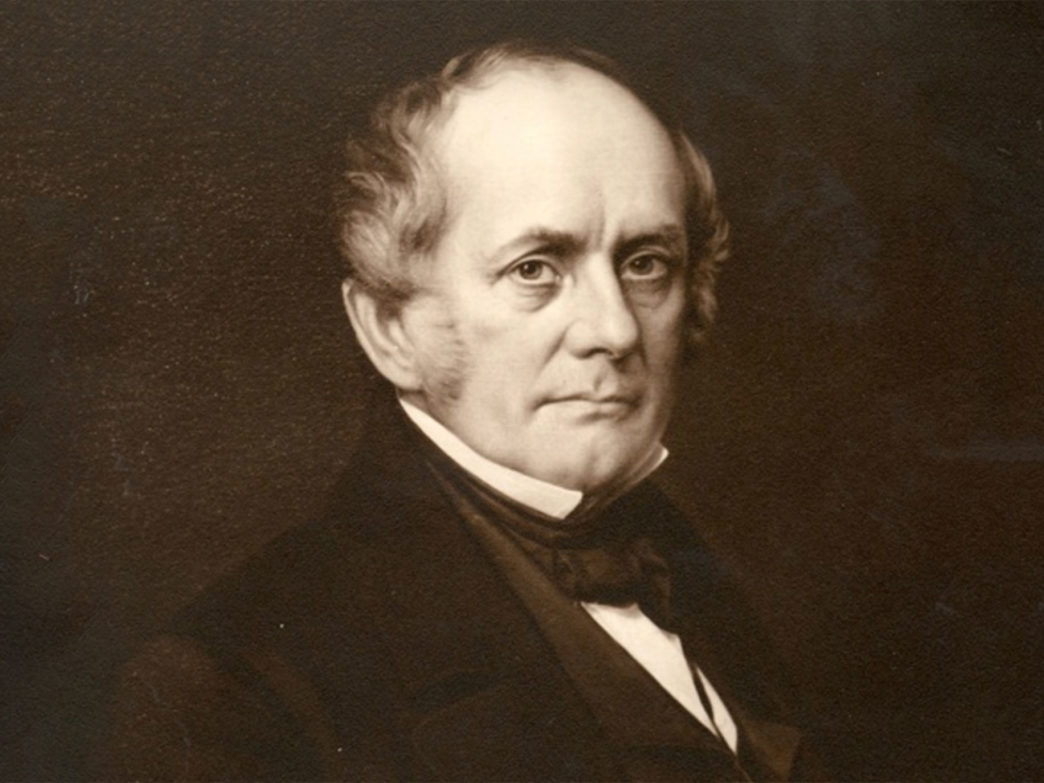
- Born: September 16, 1802; Charlestown, Massachusetts, U.S.
- Died: October 27, 1858 (aged 56); Colusa, California, U.S.
- Citizenship: Mexico, United States
- Occupations: Merchant, politician, landowner
- Known for: Only U.S. consul to Alta California
- Spouse: Rachel Hobson Holmes (m. 1833)
- Parent(s): Thomas Larkin and Ann Rogers
- Relatives: John B. R. Cooper

Thomas Oliver Larkin (September 16, 1802 – October 27, 1858), known later in life in Spanish as Don Tomás Larquin, was an American diplomat and businessman.

After some success and several business failures on the east coast, his elder half-brother, Alta California pioneer businessman Juan B. R. Cooper, invited him to join him in on the west coast, propelling him to success and wealth.

Larkin served as the only U.S. consul to Alta California during the Mexican era and was covertly involved in U.S. plans to annex California from Mexico. Following the American Conquest of California and the end of the Mexican-American War, Larkin was a delegate to the Monterey Constitutional Convention in 1849 and a signatory of the Constitution of California.

== Early years ==
Larkin was born in Charlestown, Massachusetts, the son of Thomas Larkin and Ann Rogers, and great nephew of the Deacon John Larkin who provided the horse for Paul Revere's famous ride. He was a descendant of Richard Warren, a passenger on the Mayflower, and his grandfather, Ebenezer Larkin, took part in the Battle of Bunker Hill. Larkin's mother was married three times, to Thomas Cooper, Thomas Oliver Larkin, and Amariah Childs.

On April 8, 1808, at age 6, Larkin's father died, and in 1813 Larkin's mother moved the family to Lynn, Massachusetts. At the age of 15, Larkin went to Boston to apprentice as a bookbinder but disliked working for another man. His mother died in 1818 when he was 16. He had only one close family member remaining, his brother William.

In 1819, he changed employer, but this did not resolve his dissatisfaction. On October 21, 1821 he sailed to Wilmington, North Carolina. The town was deserted due to a Yellow Fever epidemic. Determined to succeed, he persevered and obtained work as a clerk. He was extremely observant and critical of Southern business practices and disappointed at the few books available to the general population.

He contracted for a voyage to Bermuda in February 1822 as supercargo of the ship Susan. He was to be paid $20 a month plus 2 1/2% of the cargo sale. The drunk captain cheated him and Larkin was never paid.

In June 1822 he opened a store in Wilmington in partnership with his friend, F.G. Thurston. He returned to Boston for a visit and felt like he didn't belong. His brother William and he bought $5,000 in goods in the North and had them shipped to North Carolina. When Thurston tried to discredit Larkin, Larkin successfully turned back the attack on his character, but when William died on September 4, 1825, Larkin lost interest in the business venture.

He moved to Rockfish and opened another store. He was appointed Justice of the Peace, his first taste of government service, but he gave first priority to his business. He made money from the store, but was left $1,500 in debt by a sawmill operation. In 1830 he returned to Massachusetts, destitute.

Larkin felt he had three options: marry a cousin in Massachusetts, get a job in the Washington DC post office, or join his brother in California. The first two did not materialize.

== Move to Alta California ==
He received a letter from his older half-brother, John Cooper, who persuaded him that Alta California was full of opportunity, and asked for his assistance with his business. In September 1831 Thomas left Boston in September 1831 on the brig Newcastle, engaged in the hide and tallow trade. The journey via sailing ship around Cape Horn took seven months.

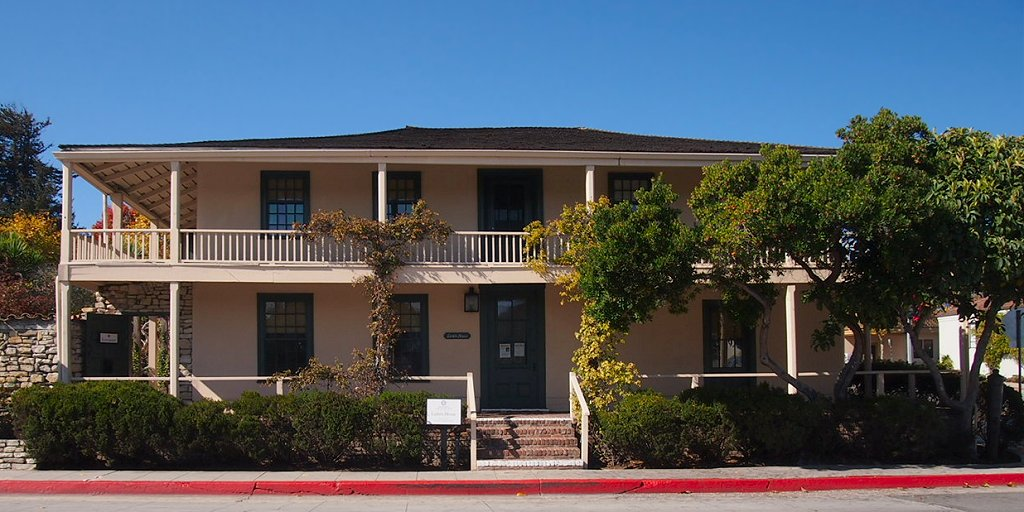
Larkin House in Monterey, California, a prime example of Monterey Colonial architecture

The only other passenger was 24 year old Mrs. Rachel Hobson Holmes, who was traveling to Alta California to join her husband, Captain A. C. Holmes, a Danish sea captain and international trader. During the months-long voyage the two had an intimate relationship. The Newcastle made a stopover in Hawai'i before arriving in San Francisco and then Monterey in April 1832.

There were no accommodations in the small town and they both were guests at the Cooper house. Upon learning she was carrying Thomas' child, Rachel moved to Santa Barbara where her husband's ship was expected. Faced with the dilemma of explaining the child to her husband, she learned in October that he had died the year before while at sea enroute from Acapulco to Lima, Peru. In January 1833, Rachel gave birth to a daughter she named Isabel Ann, the first child of American parents born in California.

In Monterey, Larkin found the economics of land and commerce were controlled by the Spanish missions, presidios, pueblos, and a few ranchos.

The lands of each mission joined those of other missions on either side, so that all were connected, or, in other words, the missionaries occupied all the land along the coast, except the presidios, the three pueblos and their lands, and a few ranchos which were held by virtue of grants from the King of Spain.... The missionaries objected to any settlements in the country but the missions; the presidios they regarded as a necessary evil.

== Marriage and children ==
Larkin remained in Monterey, working as a clerk for his brother John B. R. Cooper. In early 1833, he sailed to Santa Barbara and was reunited with Rachel Hobson. They were married on board the American bark Volunteer, on June 10, 1833. The U. S. Consul for Hawai'i, John Coffin Jones, performed the ceremony. The infant Isabel died in July 1833, a month after the wedding. Years later they discovered Jones did not have the authority to perform the service and were remarried. With an investment of $500, aided by his wife's and Captain Holmes' former accounts, he opened his own store in Monterey, selling dry goods, grog, produce, and groceries.

They had eight more children, five of whom survived to adulthood. Holmes was the first American woman to live in California.

== Business growth ==
In 1834 he built a "double geared" flour mill, the first of its kind on the West Coast. He pursued trading opportunities with Hawai'i and Mexico. In 1842 Larkin opened a second sawmill in Santa Cruz run by Josiah Belden. Larkin developed a reputation for his success in land speculation.

Larkin built the Sherman Quarters in 1834. In 1835 he built the first two-story house in California, a combination of New England and California building materials and methods that is today known as Monterey Colonial architecture. Larkin House is now part of Monterey State Historic Park. Larkin also built the first wharf at Monterey harbor and was commissioned to rebuild the Customhouse. He built the House of the Four Winds in 1834 (or 1840). The building was used as the first State of California Hall of Records.

At that time, all foreign ships had to stop at the port of Monterey to pay import/export tariffs and obtain permission to trade. Larkin was well-positioned to engage in trade with Mexico, the United States and other countries. British and American trade with China came to the Pacific Coast by way of Hawai'i.

== Political roles ==
As a prominent figure in the occasional capital of a distant province of an occasionally unstable nation, Larkin stood in a position of influence that could easily have been his undoing if he chose the wrong side. The fact that he was able to survive through shifting administrations is testimony to his political skills.

Despite being a supporter of Governor Juan Bautista Alvarado, he did not involve himself with Alvarado's accusations against Isaac Graham and other foreign residents of the Monterey area, and was not one of those sent to prison in chains in 1840. Larkin loaned money to Alvarado's successor, Micheltorena, which he lost when the Governor was overthrown by Alvarado in 1844. He never applied for Mexican citizenship, which required conversion to Catholicism; instead he renewed his visa annually to maintain his legal status. As a non-citizen, he could not legally own land, but he managed to obtain land grants in the names of his children.

In 1842, Monterey was surprised by the actions of U.S. Commodore Thomas ap Catesby Jones, who landed Marines to take over Monterey in the mistaken belief that war had broken out between the United States and Mexico. Larkin and William Hartnell worked to smooth over the situation. Jones was induced to submit a written apology to the angry Mexican officials and withdraw his troops. The Commodore was subsequently removed from his command, but U.S.–Mexican relations remained tense.

The successful conclusion to the affair brought Larkin to the attention of officials in Washington, and in 1843 President Tyler appointed Larkin as the first (and last) American consul to Alta California. The following year, he thwarted a British attempt to acquire California while he was assisting the Mexican government in building a smallpox hospital in Monterey.

With the rise of James K. Polk to the Presidency in 1845, war with Mexico seemed unavoidable. Larkin hired William Leidesdorff as Vice Consul in San Francisco, thus relieving himself of some of the burden of the office.

=== Bear Flag Revolt ===
Early in 1846, Larkin received instructions from Secretary of State James Buchanan to begin working covertly to assure all concerned that the United States would support any attempt at secession from Mexico. Toward this end, he secretly employed Abel Stearns to work in southern California. He volunteered to go to Mexico City on behalf of the United States to work out a peaceful settlement, but Congress had already declared war by the time his letter arrived in Washington. Larkin had entered into a dialog with General Mariano Vallejo with the goal of arranging a peaceful annexation of California when the Bear Flag Revolt began on 14 June 1846 and the General was captured and imprisoned by a band of Americans who had heard a rumor that the Mexican authorities were thinking of arresting all Americans.

In 1846, Marine Lieutenant Archibald Gillespie was sent by President James Polk with secret messages to U.S. Consul Larkin in Monterey, California, Commodore John D. Sloat commanding the Pacific Squadron and John C. Frémont. Gillespie, after traveling in secret across Mexico and catching a ship to California, arrived early in June 1846 with the verbal messages from Polk. What was in the messages are unknown but the Bear Flag revolt came as a surprise to Larkin.

On July 7, 1846, Commodore John D. Sloat entered Monterey Bay with three ships. His marines and "blue-jackets" (enlisted sailors) raised the American flag over the Customs House. Commodore (Rear Admiral) Robert Field Stockton replaced Sloat a week later as commander of the Pacific Squadron.

Stockton appointed Fremont commander of the volunteer militia formed around his 60-man Corps of Topographical Engineers and the Bear Flag Republicans as the California Battalion. He dispatched 160 of the forces on the USS Cyane to occupy San Diego and Los Angeles.

Larkin joined the force sailing for southern California which by August 13, had peacefully occupied San Diego, California and Los Angeles. General José Castro and Governor Pío Pico fled south. Commodore Stockton, the senior military officer in California, appointed Larkin as Naval agent, and Larkin returned to Monterey.

The apparently peaceful conquest of California soon began to fray at the edges in southern California. Revolts broke out in Los Angeles, and the occupation forces under Archibald Gillespie and his 30-40 men were driven out. José Castro returned, and Larkin moved his family to Yerba Buena (San Francisco) as the Californios throughout the province were attempting to repel the thinly spread out California Battalion garrison troops and Navy forces. Larkin was captured outside of the city when, against advice, he tried to go to his deathly ill daughter, still in Monterey.

Larkin was forced to ride to Santa Barbara. En route, he witnessed the inconclusive Battle of Natividad (near Salinas) from General Castro's side. He was later imprisoned in Los Angeles and was not reunited with his family until after the signing of the Treaty of Cahuenga which ended four months of skirmishes. His daughter Sophia Adeline died while he was a captive.

=== California statehood ===
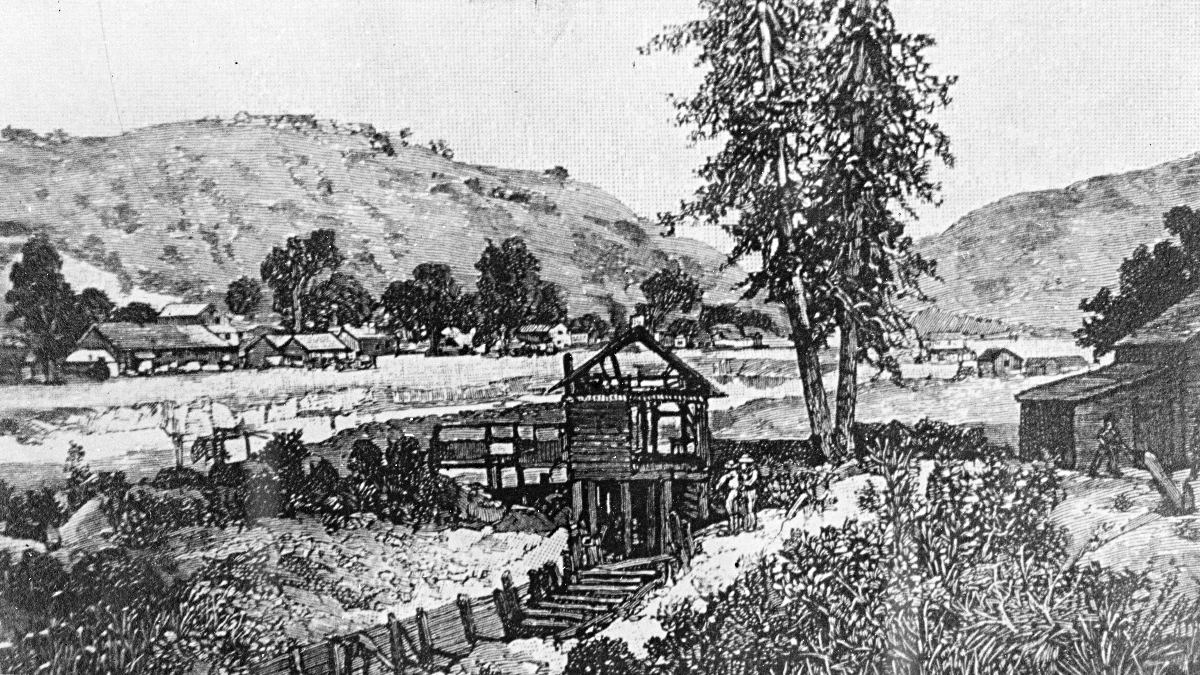
Sutter's Mill in 1851, where gold was first discovered in California, January 19, 1848

Now free to own land in his own name, Larkin turned his attention to his new opportunities. In partnership with Robert Semple, he established the city at the Carquinez Straits that became Benicia, but Larkin's business interests were in San Francisco and he sold out his share after a few years. As he took control of his own affairs, his relationship with Leidesdorff fell apart.

By the time gold was discovered, Larkin had permanently settled in the San Francisco and was in the next few years able to reap a fortune from the economic boom that followed. It was as a representative from San Francisco that he served at the 1849 Constitutional Convention, held in Monterey.

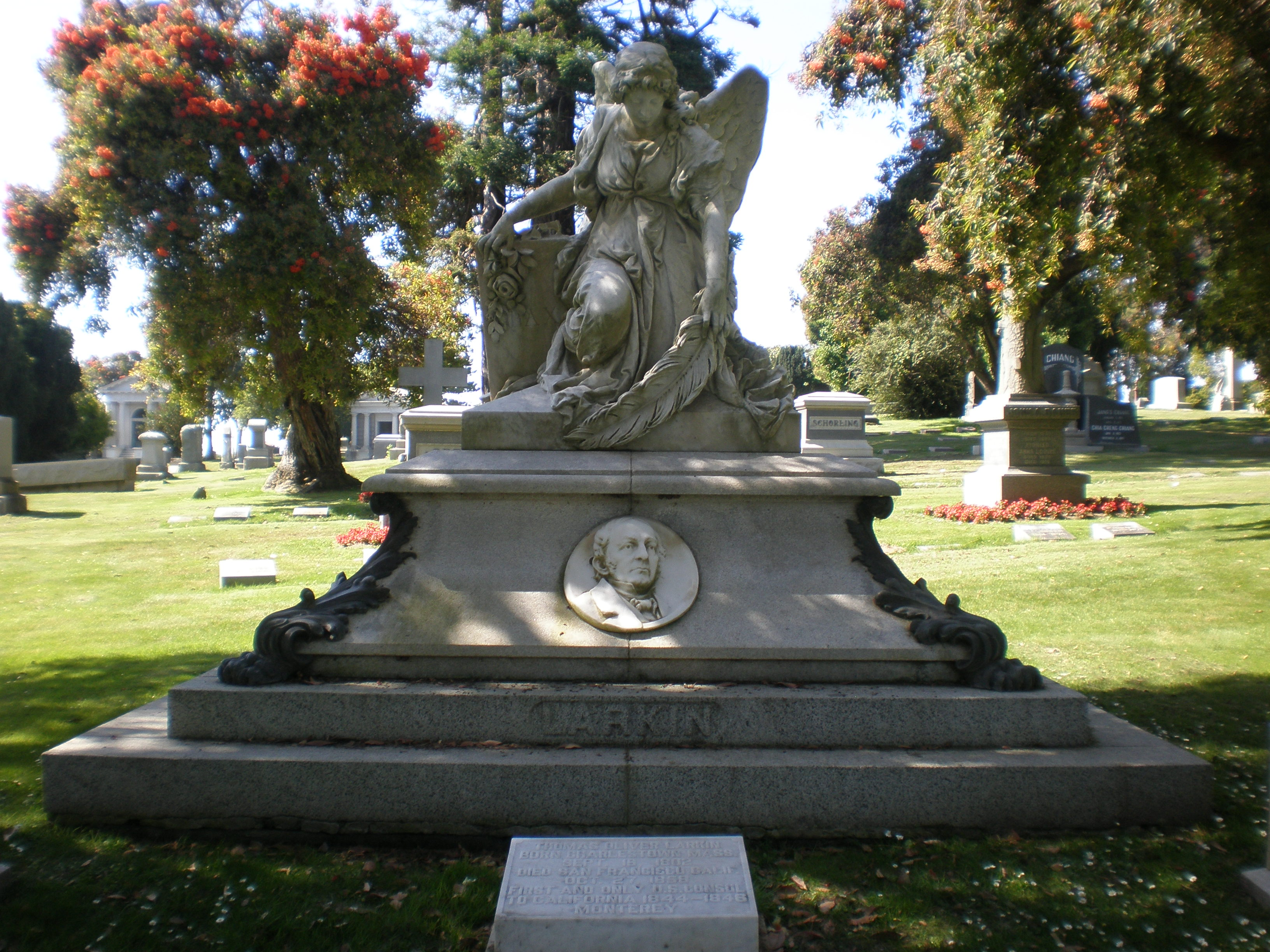
Larkin's grave at Cypress Lawn Memorial Park, Colma, California

Early in 1850, he built the first brick building in San Francisco at 1116 Stockton Street.

== Move to New York ==
In 1850 they moved to New York. They rented a comfortable suite at the Irving House, a hotel that was popular with Californians. In November they bought and renovated at great expense an eighteen-room home in a good neighborhood.

Their new home soon acquired the reputation they had gained in California for lavish hospitality. But the cold and damp eastern weather did not agree with them. Rachel and the children endured repeated bouts of illness. Thomas acquired an acute skin disease and was so ill for two months that newspapers mistakenly announced his death. When he finally began to recover, Rachel, who had helped doctor him, collapsed from exhaustion.

== Return to San Francisco ==
In May 1853, they returned to San Francisco where their health improved. They found good schools for the two youngest children and resumed their busy social and business lives. They built an opulent mansion and enjoyed the civic improvements that had taken place in San Francisco as a consequence of the California Gold Rush since they left for New York. During this time Larkin pressed the Federal government for compensation for money he claimed he had spent on Naval supplies and for work on the Monterey Customs House and the wharf there, without satisfaction.

Larkin acquired several land grants including Rancho Jimeno, Rancho Boga, Rancho Cienega del Gabilan, Rancho Pleyto, Rancho Cotate, and Rancho Larkin's Children. In his last years, Larkin engaged in land speculation and was thought by some to be the richest man in America.

== Death ==
On October 27, 1858, while at Colusa, California, he contracted typhoid fever and died within a week. He was buried in what was the Laurel Hill Cemetery in San Francisco, but he is now interred at Cypress Lawn Memorial Park in Colma, California. An obituary was published in the Sacramento Daily Union on October 29, 1858.

== Family members ==
Thomas Oliver Larkin married Rachel M. Hobson (Ipswich, Massachusetts, April 30, 1807 – San Francisco, October 29, 1873), the daughter of Daniel and Eliza Hobson, on June 10, 1833. Children:

1. Isabel Ann (Santa Barbara, January, 1833 – July, 1833), the first white child born of American parents in California.
2. Thomas Oliver, Jr., (Monterey, April 13, 1834 – San Francisco, July, 1898).
3. William Rogers (August 25, 1835 – Monterey, January 6, 1836)
4. Frederick Hobson (December 23, 1836 – May 14, 1869)
5. Henry Rogers (May 26, 1838 – Monterey, November 18, 1838)
6. Francis Rogers (January 28, 1840 – San Francisco, July 7, 1874)
7. Carolina Ann (Monterey, March 24, 1842 – 1891) m. (1) November 3, 1860 to William Lindzey Hamilton b. 1832 at Philadelphia, d. February 2, 1862; (2) October 10, 1862 to William Sampson Tams, son of Sampson and Ann Hennessey (Deas) Tams
8. Sophia Adeline (June 20, 1843 – San Francisco, November 28, 1846)
9. Alfred Otis (Monterey, April 10, 1847)

== Legacy ==
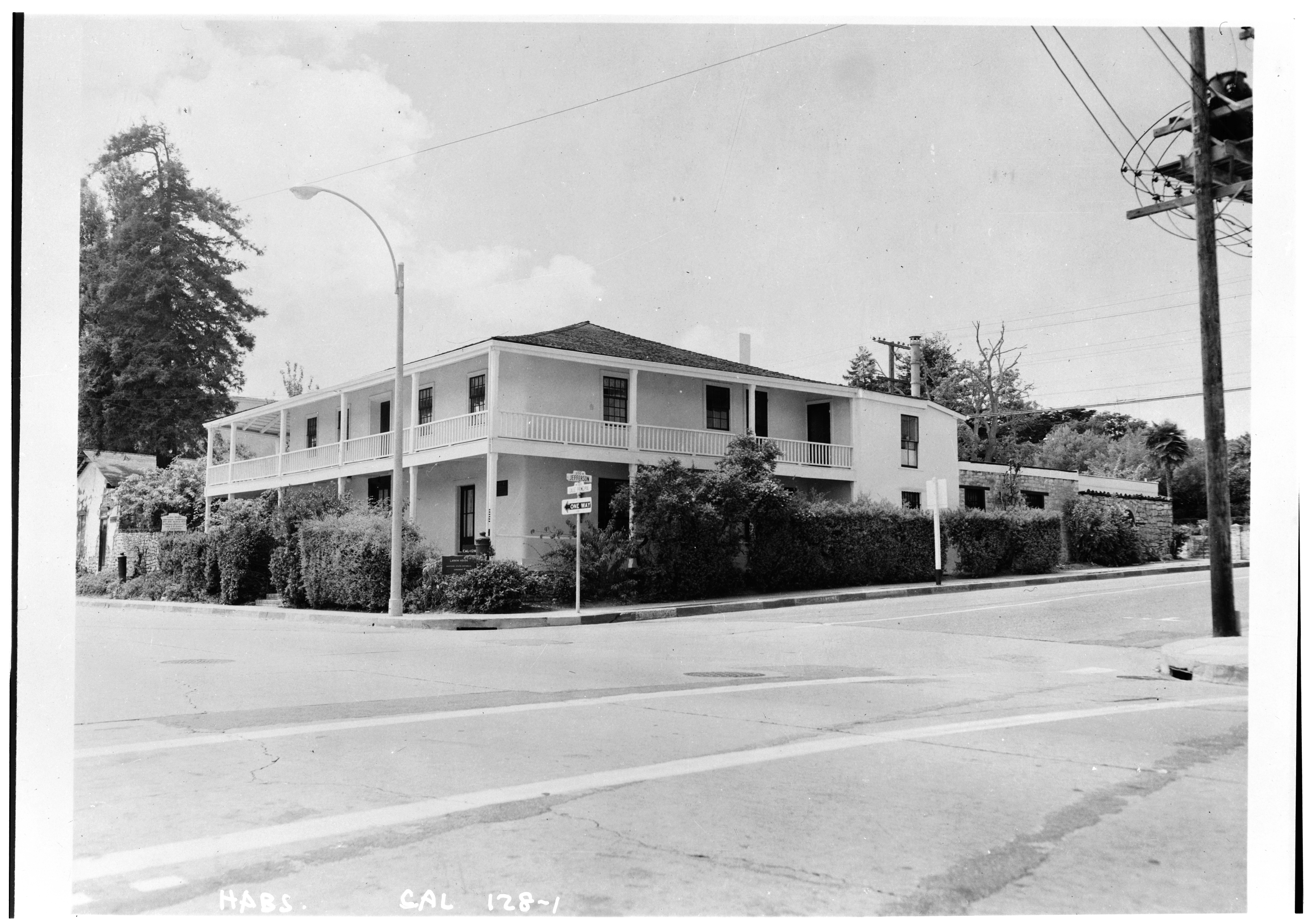
Larkin House in 1959

Larkin bought a large piece of property on Calle Principal between Jefferson and Madison Streets, in Monterey, California. In 1834 he opened a store on the property and began building a home on it, now known as the Larkin House. It was likely the first home in California to have an interior chimney and fireplace. The building marks a turning point in the development of California adobe buildings. The distinctive broad roof that overhangs the second floor windows and the second story balcony are stylish as well as practical and became the standard for adobe buildings of the period. It is a National Historic Landmark and California Historical Landmark.

The Sherman Quarters shares a parcel of land with the Larkin House. Larkin built it in 1834 and made it available as a service to U.S. troops during the U.S. occupation of California. This small adobe building served as headquarters for Lieutenant William Tecumseh Sherman and military secretary of state Henry W. Halleck from 1847 to 1849.

Larkin also built the House of the Four Winds on the same property. It served as headquarters for Henry Halleck, Secretary of State. After the Mexican–American War, the building was first used as a residence and by the Spanish Governor of Alta California Juan Bautista Alvarado. In 1846, William S. Johnson designated it as the first State of California Hall of Records for the newly formed County of Monterey. Johnson had his office and home in the building.

Larkin Street in San Francisco is named for him. An elementary school in Monterey, now closed, was named for him.

== Sources ==
- Frank Soule, John H. Gihon, James Nisbet; The annals of San Francisco: containing a summary of the history of the first discovery, settlement, progress, and present condition of California and a complete history of all the important events connected with its great city; to which are added, biographical memoirs of some prominent citizens [New York, 1855] p. 758
- Rayner Wickersham Kelsey, Ph.D., the United States Consulate in California [Berkeley, 1910]
- Eldredge MS Padrone, Monterey, 1836
- Grizzly Bear, May 1928, p. 58
- Rafael Gorney, Diary of Rafael Gorney, in Historical Society of Southern California, Sept. 1963, p. 265
- Rockwell Dennis Hunt, California and Californians [Chicago, 1926] Vol 3: 127–28
- Pioneer, v. 13, p. 107, Aug. 1898
- Los Angeles Blue Book, 1956, p. 441
- Los Angeles Herald Express, 1948-07-31
- William Ensign Lincoln, Some descendants of Stephen Lincoln of Wymondham, England... [Pittsburg, 1930]
- Myrtle Garrison, Romance & History of California Ranchos [San Francisco, c. 1935]
