= Donald Teague =

American painter and illustrator

- Born: 1897; Brooklyn, New York City, U.S.
- Died: December 13, 1991 (aged 93–94); Carmel-by-the-Sea, California, U.S.
- Education: Art Students League of New York
- Occupations: Painter, illustrator
- Spouse: Verna Teague
- Children: 2 daughters

Donald Teague (1897 – December 13, 1991) was an American magazine illustrator and watercolorist. He illustrated many magazines, and he painted in the art colony of Carmel-by-the-Sea.

== Life ==
Teague was born in 1897 in Brooklyn, New York. He was trained at the Art Students League of New York.

Teague was a magazine illustrator throughout the 1920s and 1930s, initially for the Saturday Evening Post in New York City, and for Collier's in California by 1938. Teague was also an illustrator for McCall's and Woman's Home Companion.

Teague subsequently joined the art colony in Carmel-by-the-Sea, where he painted for four decades. By the time of his death, he had become known as "the dean of American watercolorists" according to The Los Angeles Times.

With his wife Verna, Teague had two daughters. He died on December 13, 1991, in Carmel-by-the-Sea, at age 94.
