= Larkin House =

Historic house in California, United States

- U.S. National Register of Historic Places
- U.S. National Historic Landmark
- U.S. National Historic Landmark District – Contributing property
- California Historical Landmark
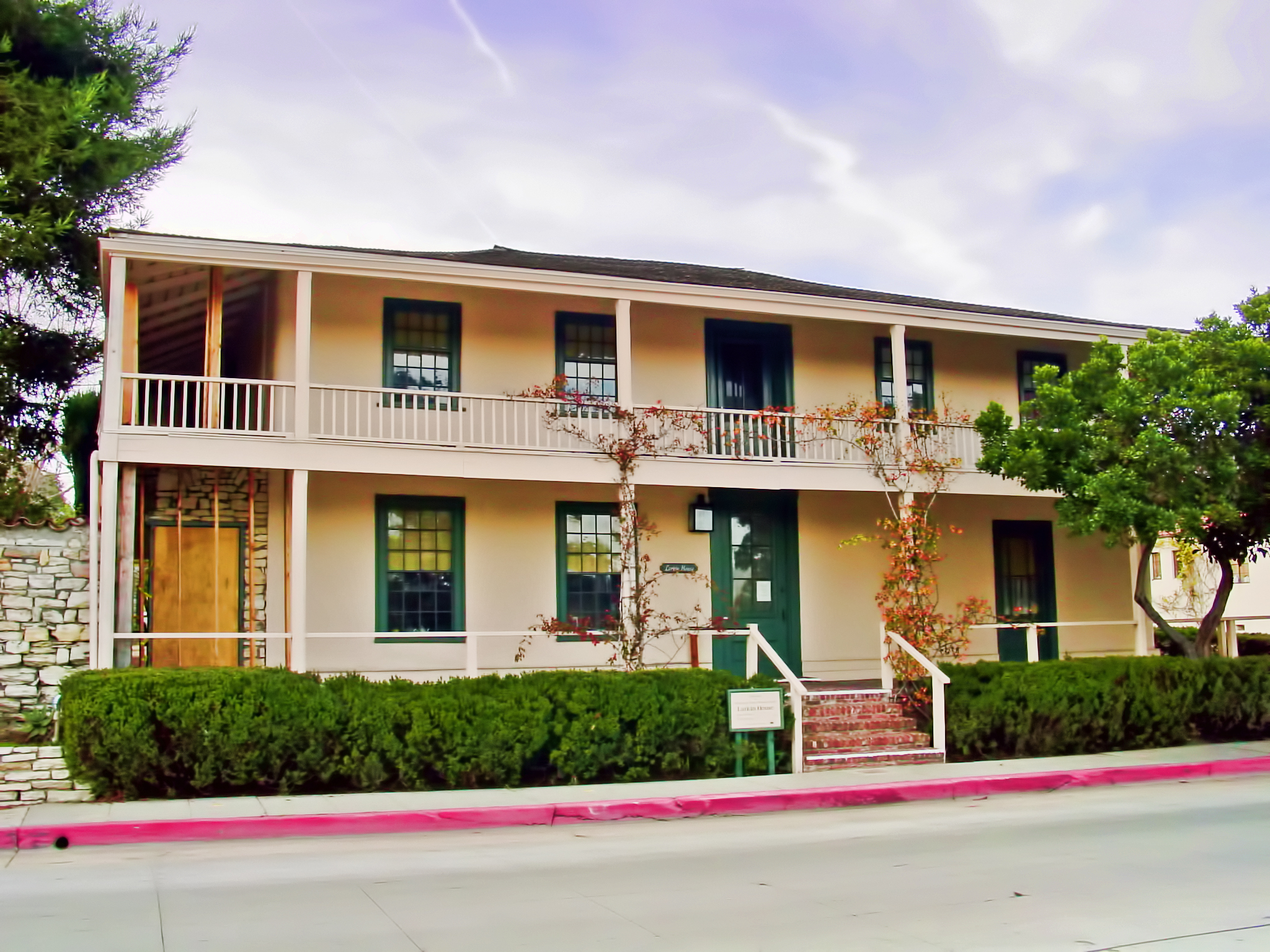
- Larkin House

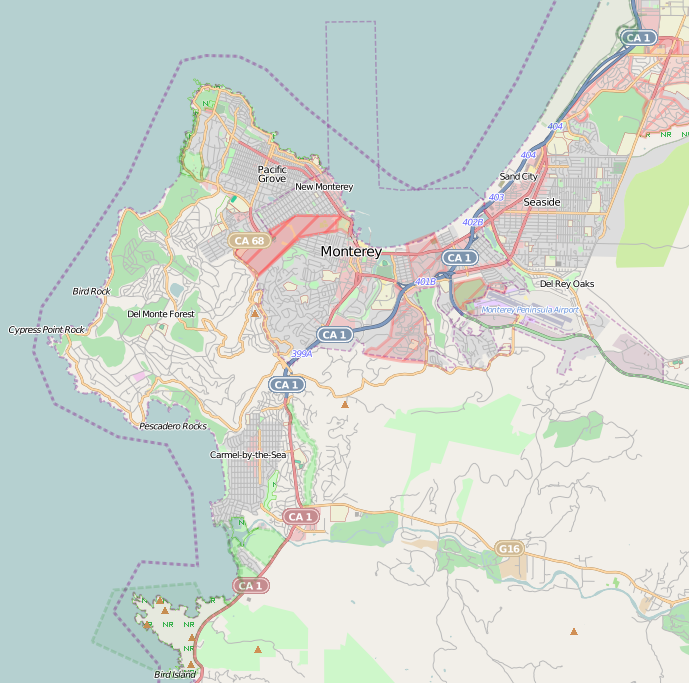
- Location within Monterey Peninsula
- Location: 510 Calle Principal, Monterey, California
- Coordinates: 36°35′53″N 121°53′42″W
- Built: 1835
- Architect: Thomas O. Larkin
- Architectural style: Monterey Colonial—Spanish Colonial
- Part of: Monterey Old Town Historic District (ID70000137)
- NRHP reference No.: 66000215
- CHISL No.: 106

Significant dates
- Added to NRHP: October 15, 1966
- Designated NHL: December 19, 1960
- Designated NHLDCP: April 15, 1970
- Designated CHISL: March 29, 1933

The Larkin House is a historic house at 464 Calle Principal in Monterey, California. Built in 1835 by Thomas O. Larkin, it is claimed to be the first two-story house in all of California, with a design combining Spanish Colonial building methods with New England architectural features to create the popular Monterey Colonial style of architecture. The Larkin House is both a National and a California Historical Landmark, and is a featured property of Monterey State Historic Park. It formerly operated as the United States Consulate to Mexico in Alta California.

== Description ==
The Larkin House is located in the historic center of Monterey, California, at the southwest corner of Calle Principal and Jefferson Street. It is a two-story wood-frame structure, with walls of adobe and a low-pitch hip roof. Three of its four sides are covered by a two-story wood-frame flat-roof veranda. The post-and-beam framing is exposed in the interior, where there is also a fireplace and chimney.

The building was originally part of a large piece of property at Calle Principal in Monterey. It shares a parcel of land with the Sherman Quarters. In William T. Sherman's memoirs, he described the house as "the adobe back of Larkin's. The entrance is located in the gardens of the Larkin House."

== History ==
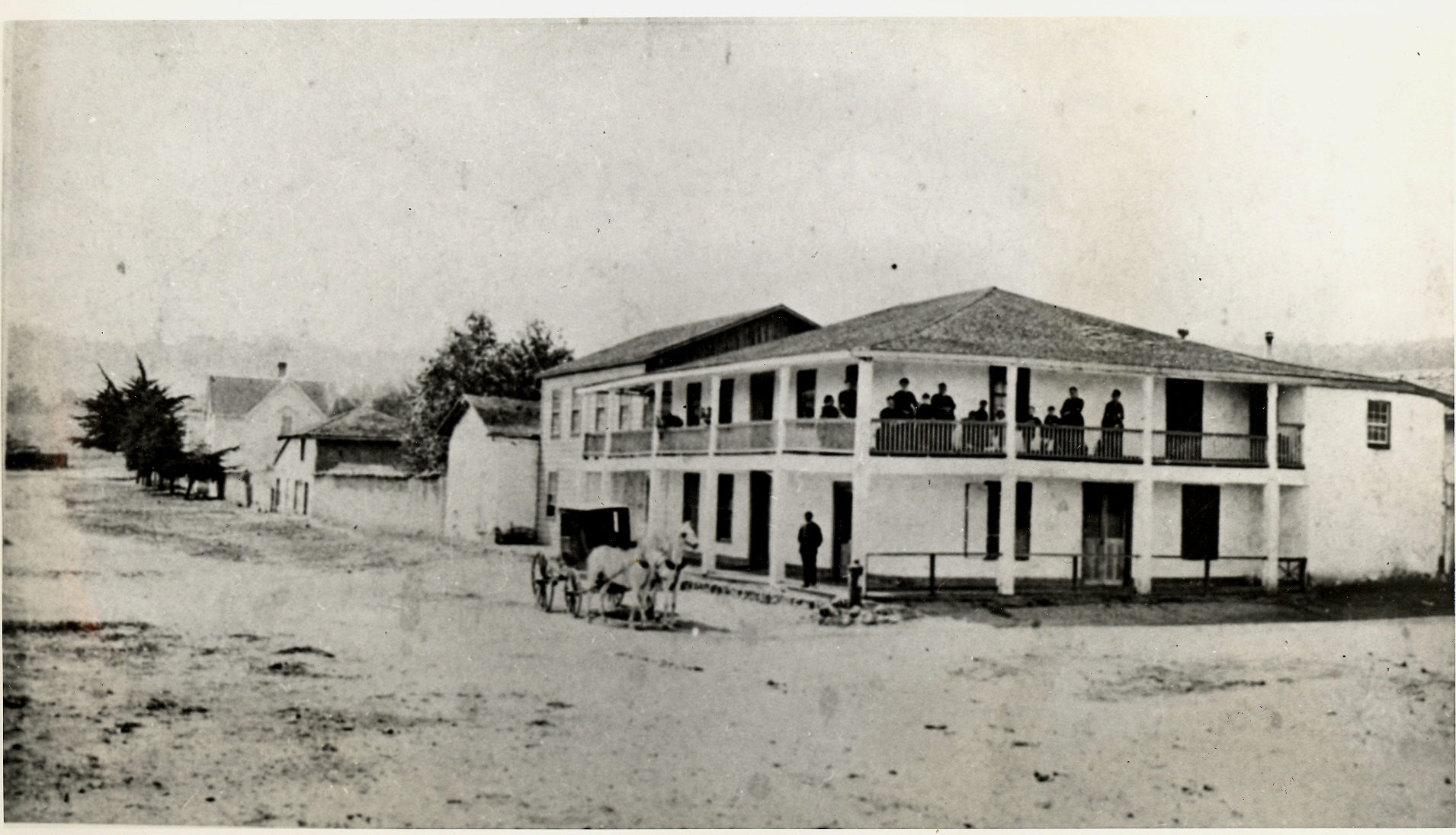
Thomas Larkin House, Monterey, California, circa 1890

In 1832 Thomas O. Larkin, a native of Massachusetts, joined his half-brother John B. R. Cooper in business in California. Larkin became the most influential American in Monterey, then the capital of Alta California. He served as the only United States consul to Mexico in Monterey. Larkin sought to build a house more typical of his native New England, but local sawmills were unable to supply him with sufficient redwood for the purpose.

Larkin compromised by building a typical New England frame, but then finished its walls in whitewashed adobe. The construction using a wooden frame and mud bricks resulted in a leaner, sturdier adobe building than traditional adobe structures made primarily from mud and straw. The greater stability of Monterey buildings—compared to single-story adobes—allowed for a large second-story and long covered porch. The covered second story porch also protected the adobe façade and walls of the house from water damage.

By adapting an east coast building form to available California materials, adobe and redwood, and to California architectural preferences, Larkin created a style that synthesized elements of two very different cultures, that of the Spanish and Mexican colonists and of the Americans moving into California.

The framing made it possible to significantly enlarge the window openings over traditional Spanish Colonial architecture, and the style of this house rapidly spread across California. The house is believed to be the first two-story house in California, and the first to have a chimney.

The Larkin House was designated as a California Historical Landmark in 1933. It then became a National Historic Landmark in 1960 and is part of the larger Monterey State Historic Park, which is itself designated a National Historic Landmark District.

== See also ==
- List of National Historic Landmarks in California
- National Register of Historic Places listings in Monterey County, California
