= Monterey Colonial architecture =

Style of architecture

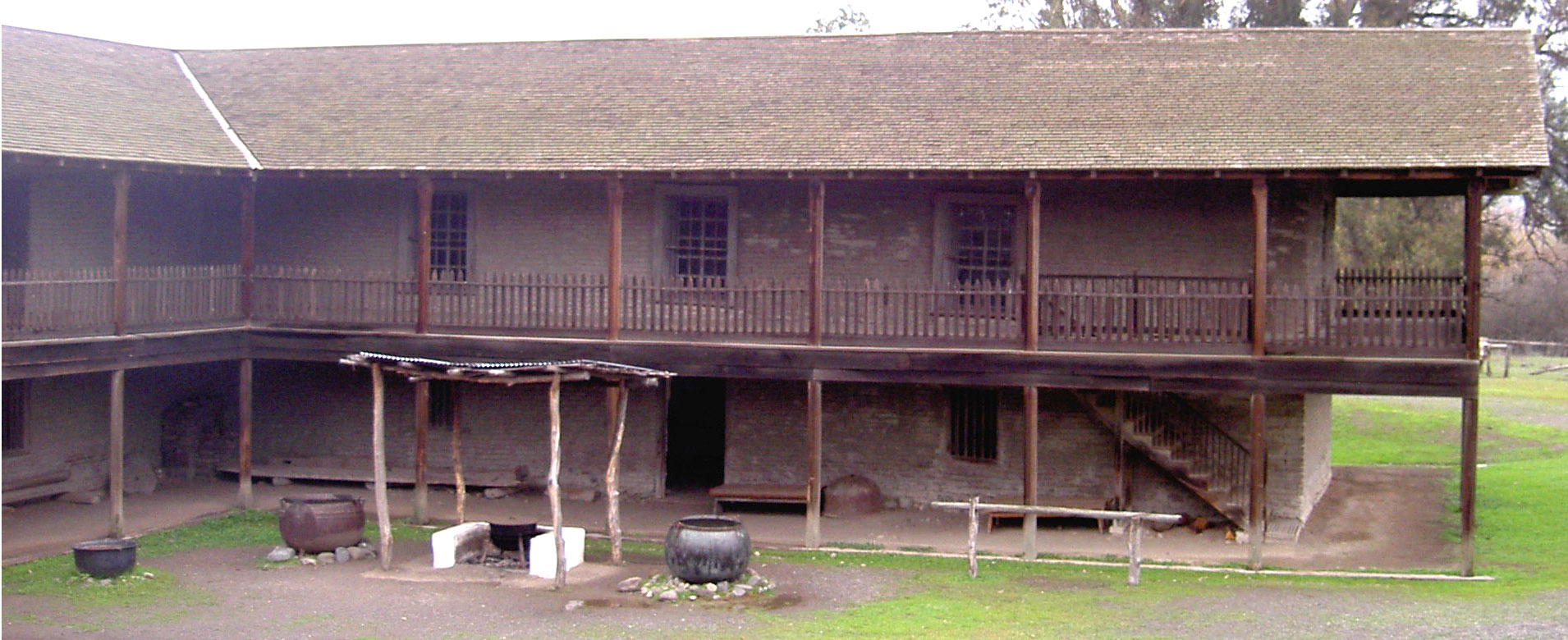
Monterey Colonial style house at Rancho Petaluma Adobe

Monterey Colonial is an architectural style developed in Alta California (today's US state of California). Although usually categorized as a sub-style of Spanish Colonial style, the Monterey style is native to the post-colonial Mexican era of Alta California. Creators of the Monterey style were mostly recent immigrants from New England states of the US, who brought familiar vernacular building styles and methods with them to California.

== History ==
The style is characterized by two stories, continuous surrounding porches on both levels, and a hip roof, often created by adding a framed upper level over existing adobe walls on the lower level. The first known example of the style is the Larkin House in Monterey, California, built by Thomas O. Larkin in 1835. The largest example of the style is the Rancho Petaluma Adobe, begun by Mariano Vallejo in Petaluma, California, in 1836.

Revivals of the style have been popular in the 20th century, substituting wood framing or brick for adobe. Other common variations use gable-end roofs and second-story-only covered porches. Monterey Colonial is one of the historical styles recognized (though not encouraged for new construction) by the architectural design guidelines of Santa Barbara, California.

== Examples ==
- Larkin House (built 1835), Monterey, California; a U.S. National Historic Landmark
- Casa Amesti (built 1834), Monterey, California
- Mary C. W. Black Studio House (built before 1925), Monterey, California; one of few residential examples of the style in the city
- Jose Maria Alviso Adobe (built 1837), Milpitas, California
- Jose Eusebio Boronda Adobe (built 1846), Salinas, California
- Castro Adobe (built 1848–1849), formerly Rancho San Andres, near Watsonville, California
- Vicente Martinez Adobe (built 1849), Martinez, California
- José Castro House (built 1840), San Juan Bautista, California

== See also ==
- Spanish Colonial architecture
