= Architectural Resources Group =

- Type: Corporation
- Industry: Architecture, Historic Preservation, and Urban Planning
- Founded: 1980
- Founder: Bruce Judd, Steven Farneth
- Headquarters: Pier 9, The Embarcadero, Suite 107, San Francisco, California 94111
- Number of locations: 2: Pasadena, California; Portland, Oregon
- Services: Urban planning, architecture, and Historic Preservation
- Website: http://www.argcreate.com

Architectural Resources Group (or ARG; also known as Architects, Planners & Conservators, Inc.) is a firm founded in 1980 by Bruce Judd and Steve Farneth in San Francisco, California. It began by providing professional services in the fields of architecture and urban planning with particular expertise in historic preservation. In 2000, David Wessel, a Principal of ARG, founded a separate conservation-contracting division, ARG Conservation Services which operates under the same roof as ARG. By 2005, the firm had expanded to a full-service architecture firm with 50+ employees. ARG also opened offices in Pasadena in 2007 (in Los Angeles since 2019) serving Southern California, and Portland, Oregon, serving the Pacific Northwest.

== Company ==
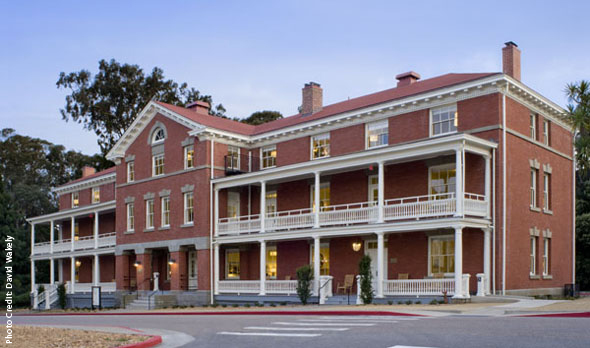
Inn at the Presidio

Because of the complex range of issues common to preservation projects, the firm associates with consultants in diverse fields such as architectural history, preservation technology, building pathology, urban planning, building materials, engineering, real estate, and economics.

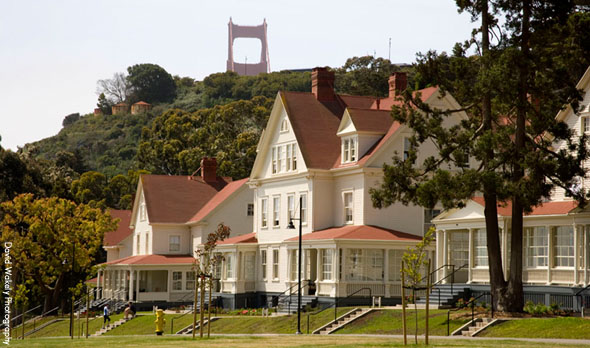
Cavallo Point at Fort Baker

ARG was among the first architecture firms in the United States to include architectural conservators as staff members. ARG has provided a range of services for various National Historic Landmarks, buildings listed on the U.S. National Register of Historic Places, local historic districts, and other culturally significant sites.

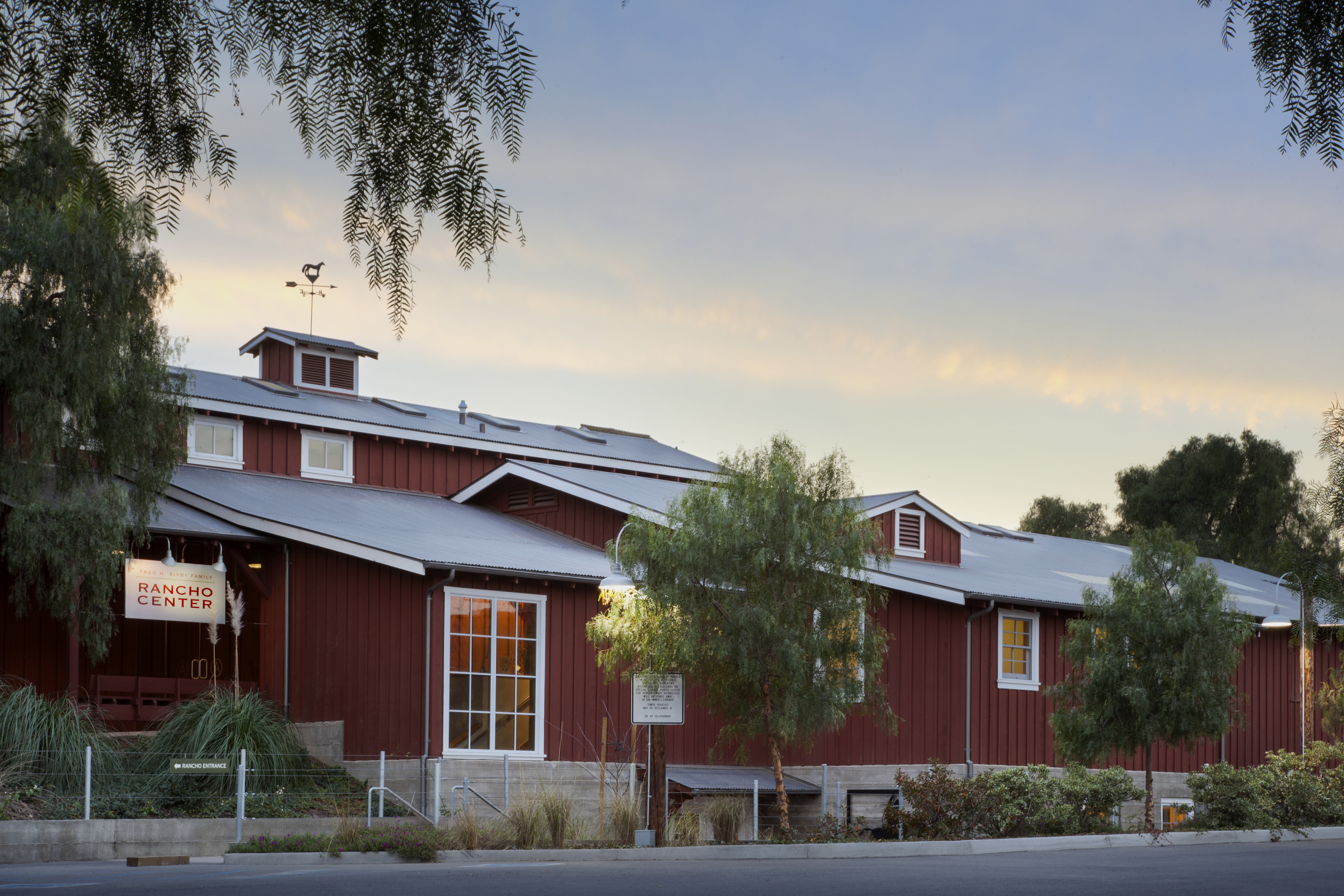
Rancho Los Alamitos

== Awards ==
The firm and its projects have received more than 100 awards in design excellence, conservation, and planning, including those sponsored by the National Trust for Historic Preservation, the American Institute of Architects, the California Governor's Office, and the California Preservation Foundation. In 2006, ARG received the Firm of the Year Award from the AIA California Council. In 2016, ARG was honored with a Palladio Award for its Steven S. Koblik Education and Visitor Center at the Huntington Library.

== Affiliations ==
ARG retains close alliances and involvement with national and international preservation policy and advocacy organizations such as the Office of the United States Secretary of the Interior, National Trust for Historic Preservation, ICOMOS, DoCoMoMo, the Association for Preservation Technology International, and the American Institute for Conservation of Historic and Artistic Works.

== Notable projects ==
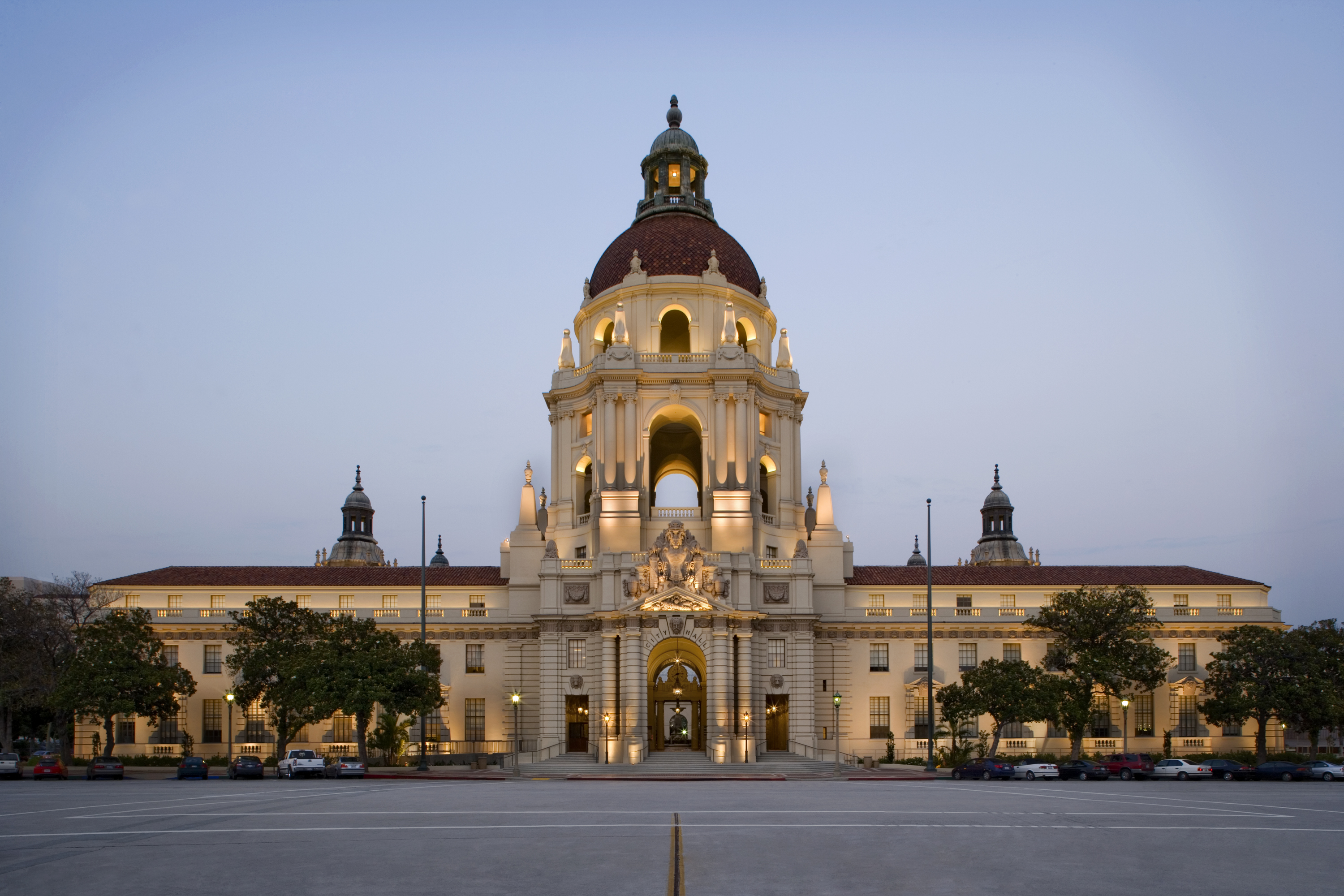
Pasadena City Hall

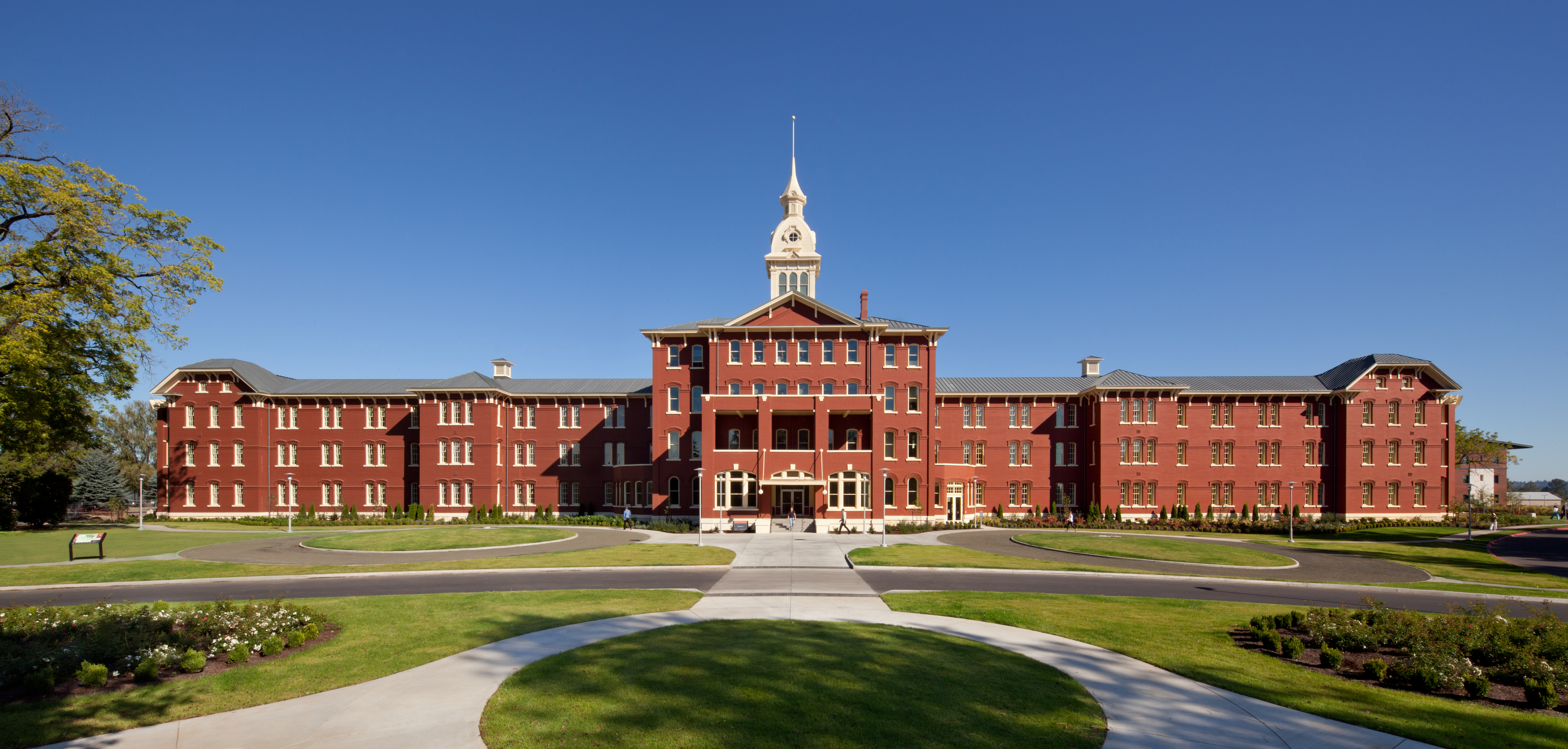
Oregon State Hospital in Salem, Oregon

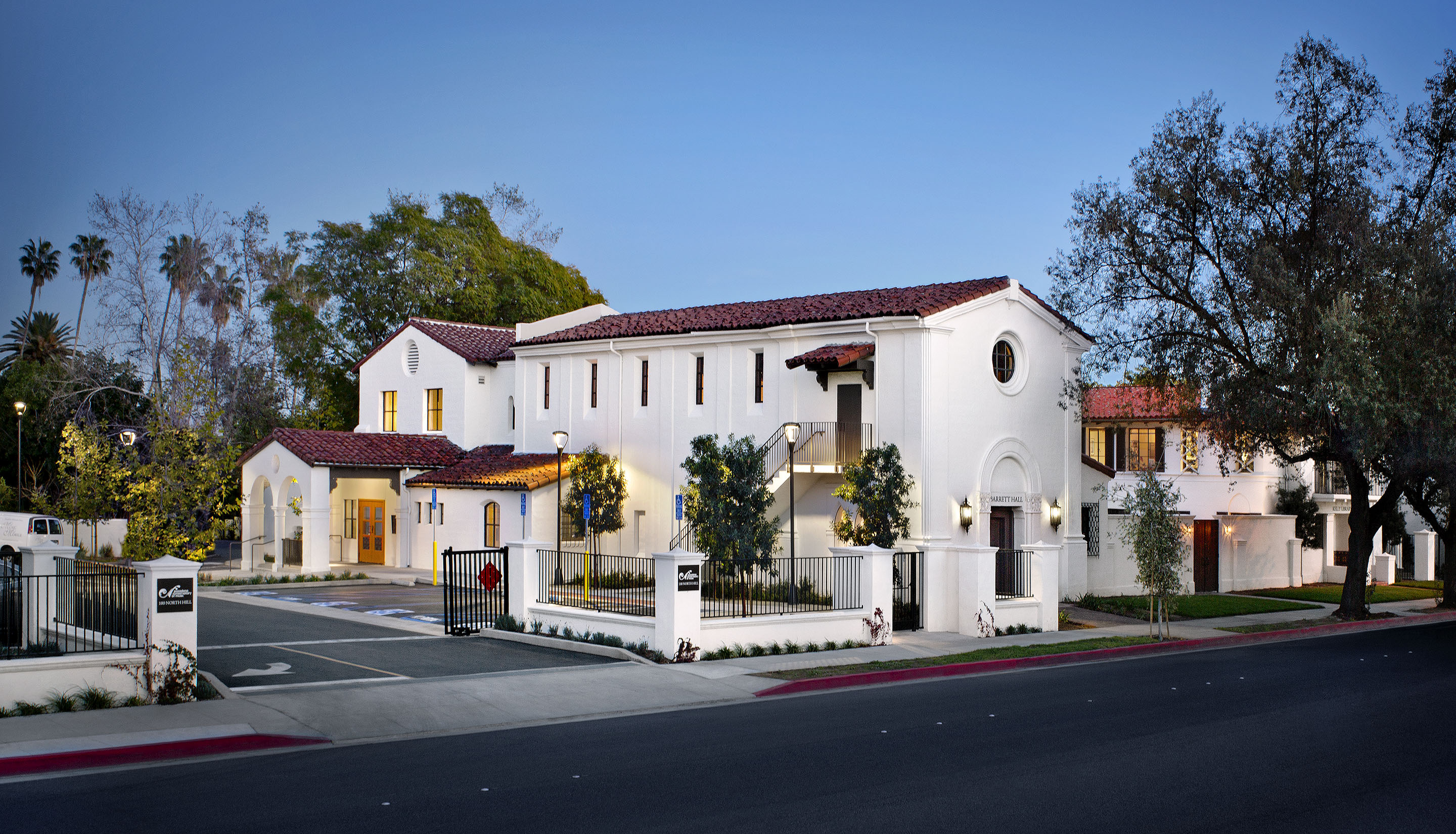
The Pasadena Conservatory of Music

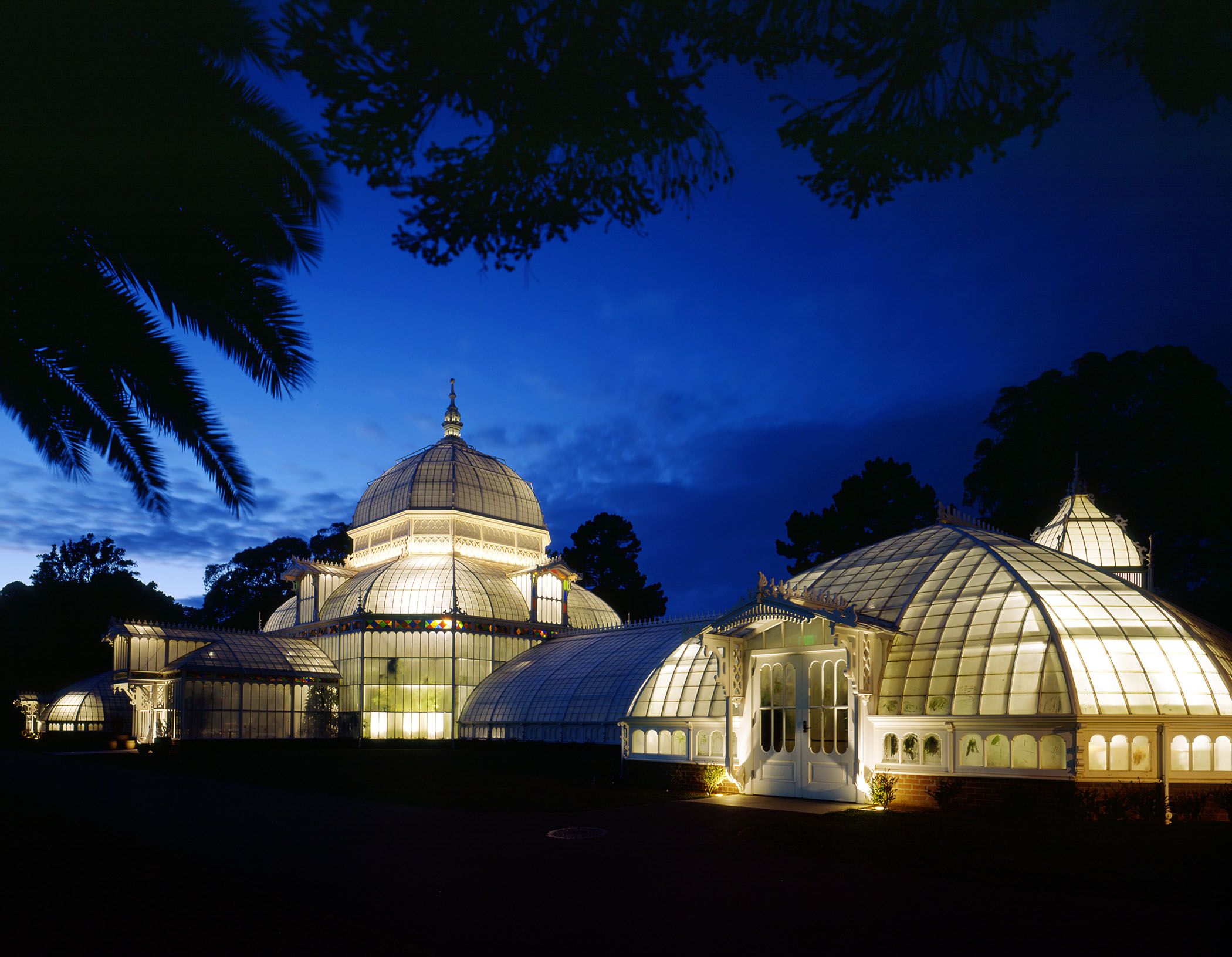
San Francisco Conservatory of Flowers

=== Architecture and cultural resource preservation ===
- Buena Vista Winery, Restoration and Seismic Strengthening, Sonoma, California
- California Institute of Technology, Linde + Robinson Laboratory for Global Environmental Sciences, Pasadena, California
- Cavallo Point, the Lodge at the Golden Gate, Fort Baker, Golden Gate National Recreation Area, California
- Conservatory of Flowers, Restoration & Repair, Golden Gate Park, San Francisco, California
- Curry Village Lounge and Registration Buildings, Yosemite National Park, California
- Filoli Estate, New Visitor Center and Café Addition, Woodside, California
- Furnace Creek Visitor Center, Death Valley National Park, California
- Huntington Library, Art Collection, and Botanical Gardens, Education and Visitor Center, San Marino, California
- Inn at the Presidio, Presidio of San Francisco, San Francisco, California
- Napa Valley Opera House, Rehabilitation & New Addition, Napa, California
- Napa Valley Vintners, Jackse Barn, Adaptive reuse, Napa, California
- Oregon State Hospital, Adaptive Reuse and Restoration, Salem, Oregon
- Pasadena City Hall, Seismic Retrofit, Rehabilitation and Repairs, Pasadena, California
- Pasadena Conservatory of Music, Pasadena, California
- Sunset Center, Rehabilitation and New Addition, Carmel-By-The-Sea, California

=== Conservation ===
- 450 Sutter Street, Window Stabilization, Rehabilitation & Replacement, San Francisco, California
- The 5th Avenue Theatre, Restoration, Seattle, Washington
- Angel Island Immigration Station, San Francisco Bay, California
- Charles Krug Winery, Rehabilitation and Structural Strengthening, Napa Valley, California
- Coit Memorial Tower, Mural Restoration and Waterproofing, San Francisco, California
- David Ireland Residence, Conservation, San Francisco, California
- Mark Hopkins Hotel, Design Services, San Francisco, California
- New Mission Theater, Restoration, San Francisco, California
- Old Saint Mary's Cathedral, Restoration and Seismic Strengthening, San Francisco, California
- San Francisco Maritime Museum, Restoration, San Francisco Maritime National Historical Park, California
- Washington State Capitol Campus, Conservation, Olympia, Washington
- Watts Towers State Historic Park, Los Angeles, California

=== Historic structures reports ===
- The Ahwahnee Hotel, Yosemite National Park, California
- First Church of Christ, Scientist, Berkeley, California
- Frank Lloyd Wright-Designed Hanna House, Stanford University, California
- Los Angeles Union Station, Los Angeles, California
- McConaghy House, Hayward, California
- Old United States Mint Building, San Francisco, California
- Rancho Los Alamitos, Long Beach, California
- Reno Depot, Reno, Nevada
- State Forester's Office Building, Salem, Oregon
- The Village Green, Baldwin Hills, California
- Washington State Capitol, Olympia, Washington

=== Design review and historic resource surveys ===
- Century Plaza Hotel, Historic Resource Assessment and Impacts Analysis, Los Angeles, California
- City of Anaheim, Historic Resource Survey, Anaheim, California
- City of Burbank, Historic Sign Survey, Burbank, California
- Hawaiʻi Volcanoes National Park, Crater Rim Drive Historic Road Inventory, Hawaii, Hawaii
- Monterey Old Town National Historic Landmark District, Historic Context Statement and Survey, Monterey, California
- Oregon Parks and Recreation Department, Context Statement and Inventory, Oregon
- Palo Alto Children's Library, Section 106 Compliance, Palo Alto, California
- Pier 27 Cruise Ship Terminal, San Francisco, California
- Presidio Design Guidelines, Presidio of San Francisco, California
- Survey LA, Citywide Historic Resources Survey, Los Angeles, California
- Tomales Design Guidelines, Tomales, California
