= SMCA =

SMCA most frequently refers to the MOMus–Museum of Modern Art–Costakis Collection.

SMCA may also refer to:

== Places ==
=== Cities ===
- San Mateo, California, a city in California and in the United States
- Santa Maria, California, a city in California and in the United States
- Santa Monica, California, a city in California and in the United States

=== Marine protected areas ===
- Arrow Point to Lion Head Point State Marine Conservation Area, American marine protected area located on Santa Catalina Island, California
- White Rock (Cambria) State Marine Conservation Area, American marine protected area located in Cambria, California
- Drakes Estero State Marine Conservation Area, American marine protected area located on Point Reyes National Seashore
- Laguna Beach State Marine Conservation Area, American marine protected area located on Laguna Beach, California
- Bodega Head State Marine Conservation Area, American marine protected arena located on Bodega Bay
- Swami's State Marine Conservation Area Encinitas, American marine protected area located in Encinitas, California
- Famosa Slough State Marine Conservation Area, American marine protected area located in San Diego, California
- Bolsa Bay State Marine Conservation Area, American marine protected area located in Orange County, California
- Point Sur State Marine Reserve and Marine Conservation Area, American marine protected area located on Point Sur, California
- Pillar Point State Marine Conservation Area, American marine protected area located on Pillar Point, California
- Duxbury Reef State Marine Conservation Area, American marine protected area located on Bolimas, California
- Campus Point State Marine Conservation Area, American marine protected area located on the University of California, Santa Barbara
- Pacific Grove Marine Gardens State Marine Conservation Area, American marine protected area located in Monterey, California, and Pacific Grove, California
- White Rock (Cambria) State Marine Conservation Area, American marine protected area located in Cambria, California
- Russian River State Marine Conservation Area, American marine protected area located in Sonoma County, California
- Point Buchon State Marine Conservation Area, American marine protected area located in San Luis Obispo County, California
- Abalone Cove State Marine Conservation Area, American marine protected area located in Los Angeles County, California
- Año Nuevo State Marine Conservation Area, American marine protected area located on both San Mateo County, California, and Santa Cruz, California
- Carmel Bay State Marine Conservation Area, American marine protected area located on both Carmel Bay, Carmel-by-the-Sea, California
- Big Creek State Marine Conservation Area , American marine protected area located on Big Sur, California
- Point Reyes State Marine Conservation Area, American marine protected area located on Drakes Bay, California
- Saunders Reef State Marine Conservation Area, American marine protected area located on Schooner Gulch State Beach and Sail Rock, Mendocino County, California
- Naples State Marine Conservation Area, American marine protected area located on Santa Barbara County, California
- Crystal Cove State Marine Conservation Area, American marine protected area located on Newport Beach, California
- Cat Harbor State Marine Conservation Area, American marine protected area located on Santa Catalina Island, California
- Greyhound Rock State Marine Conservation Area, American marine protected area located on San Mateo County, California and Santa Cruz County, California
- Farnsworth Offshore State Marine Conservation Areas, American marine protected areas located on California
- Upper Newport Bay State Marine Conservation Area, American marine protected area located on Newport Bay, California
- Batiquitos Lagoon State Marine Conservation Area, American marine protected area located in San Diego, California
- San Diego-Scripps Coastal Marine Conservation Area, American marine protected area located in La Jolla, California
- Point Dume State Marine Conservation Area, American marine protected area located in Los Angeles County, California
- Cambria State Marine Conservation Area, American marine protected area located in Cambria, California
- Lovers Cove State Marine Conservation Area and Casino Point State Marine Conservation Area, American marine protected areas located on Santa Catalina Island, California
- Dana Point State Marine Conservation Area, American marine protected area located in Orange County, California
- South La Jolla State Marine Conservation Area, American marine protected areas located in San Diego County, California
- Edward F. Ricketts State Marine Conservation Area, American marine protected area located on Monterey Bay, California
- Goleta Slough State Marine Conservation Area, American marine protected area located in Goleta, California
- Stewarts Point State Marine Conservation Area, American marine protected area located in Sonoma County, California
- San Elijo Lagoon State Marine Conservation Area, American marine protected area located in Encinitas, California
- Tijuana River Mouth State Marine Conservation Area, American marine protected area located in San Diego County, California
- Sea Lion Cove State Marine Conservation Area, American marine protected area located on Point Arena, California
- Kashtayit State Marine Conservation Area, American marine protected area located in Gaviota Cost, California
- Blue Cavern State Marine Conservation Areas , American marine protected area located in Santa Catalina Island, California

=== Schools ===
- St. Mary Catholic Academy (Toronto), Canadian Catholic secondary school located in Toronto, Canada.

== Films ==
- Secret Magic Control Agency, 2021 English-language Russian animated spy comedy film

== Other ==
- Sharp Manufacturing Company of America, a manufacturing plant in Memphis, Tennessee, United States owned by Sharp Corporation

== See also ==
- SMR
