= List of marine protected areas of California =

State and federally managed ocean reserves

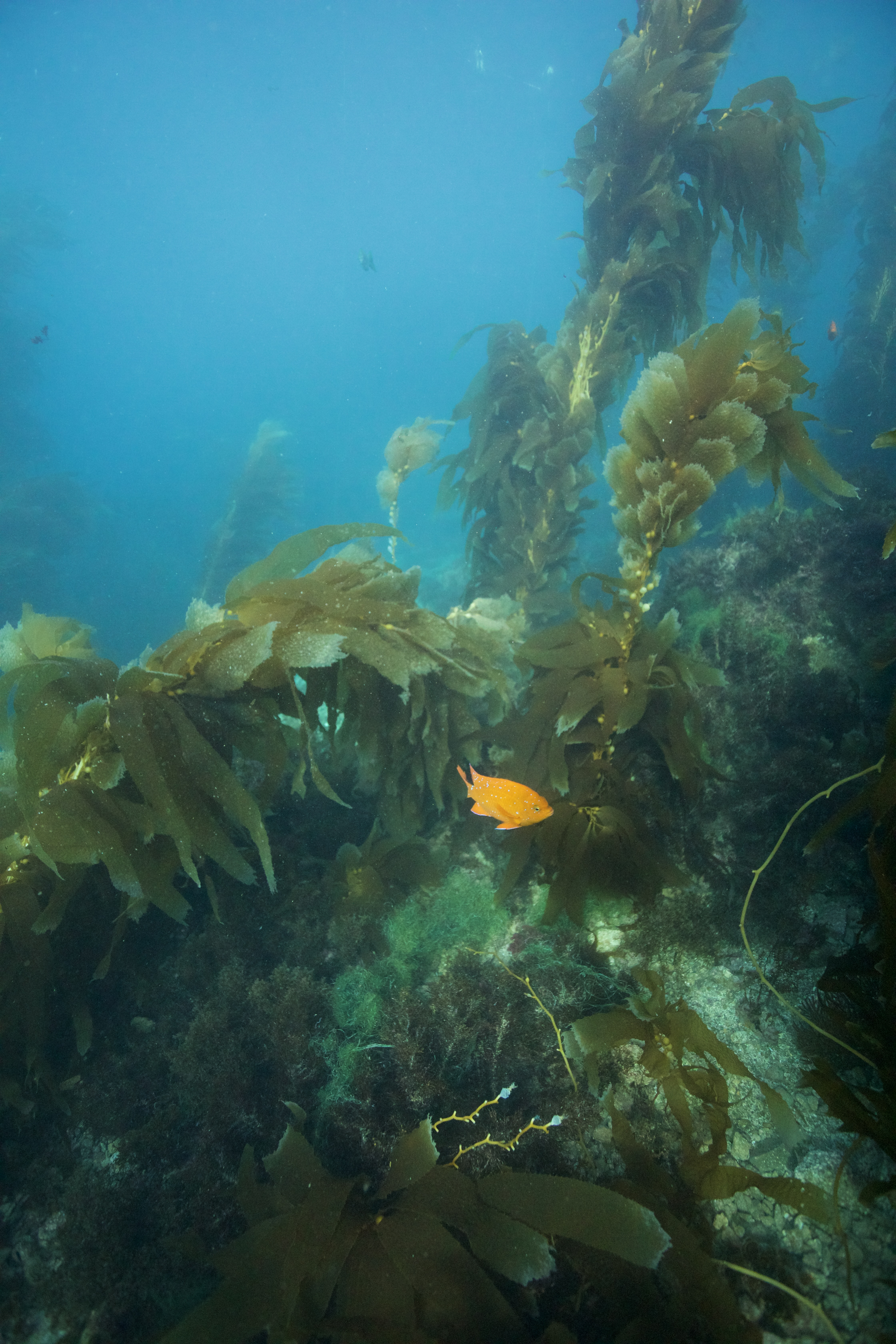
Garibaldi, the state fish of California, photographed near Catalina Island's Casino Point State Marine Conservation Area

There are both state and federal marine protected areas off the coast of California.

== Federal marine protected areas ==
- California Coastal National Monument
- Channel Islands National Marine Sanctuary
- Chumash Heritage National Marine Sanctuary
- Cordell Bank National Marine Sanctuary
- Greater Farallones National Marine Sanctuary
- Monterey Bay National Marine Sanctuary

== State marine protected areas ==
Unless otherwise stated the source is the California Department of Fish and Wildlife. The list is ordered north to south with some imprecision around the San Francisco Bay and Channel Islands locations.

- Pyramid Point State Marine Conservation Area, Del Norte County
- Point St. George Reef Offshore State Marine Conservation Area, Del Norte County
- Southwest Seal Rock Special Closure, Del Norte County
- Castle Rock Special Closure, Del Norte County
- False Klamath Rock Special Closure, Del Norte County
- Reading Rock State Marine Conservation Area, Humboldt County
- Reading Rock State Marine Reserve, Humboldt County
- Samoa State Marine Conservation Area, Humboldt County
- South Humboldt Bay State Marine Recreational Management Area, Humboldt County
- Sugarloaf Island Special Closure, Humboldt County
- South Cape Mendocino State Marine Reserve, Humboldt County
- Steamboat Rock Special Closure, Humboldt County
- Mattole Canyon State Marine Reserve, Humboldt County
- Sea Lion Gulch State Marine Reserve, Humboldt County
- Big Flat State Marine Conservation Area, Humboldt County
- Double Cone Rock State Marine Conservation Area, Mendocino County
- Rockport Rocks Special Closure, Mendocino County
- Vizcaino Rock Special Closure, Mendocino County
- Ten Mile State Marine Reserve, Mendocino County
- Ten Mile Beach State Marine Conservation Area, Mendocino County
- Ten Mile Estuary State Marine Conservation Area, Mendocino County
- MacKerricher State Marine Conservation Area, Mendocino County
- Point Cabrillo State Marine Reserve, Mendocino County
- Russian Gulch State Marine Conservation Area, Mendocino County
- Big River Estuary State Marine Conservation Area, Mendocino County
- Van Damme State Marine Conservation Area, Mendocino County
- Navarro River Estuary State Marine Conservation Area, Mendocino County
- Point Arena State Marine Reserve, Mendocino County
- Point Arena State Marine Conservation Area, Mendocino County
- Sea Lion Cove State Marine Conservation Area, Mendocino County
- Saunders Reef State Marine Conservation Area, Mendocino County
- Del Mar Landing State Marine Reserve, Sonoma County
- Stewarts Point State Marine Conservation Area, Sonoma County
- Stewarts Point State Marine Reserve, Sonoma County
- Salt Point State Marine Conservation Area, Sonoma County
- Gerstle Cove State Marine Reserve, Sonoma County
- Russian River State Marine Recreational Management Area, Sonoma County
- Russian River State Marine Conservation Area, Sonoma County
- Bodega Head State Marine Reserve, Sonoma County
- Estero Americano State Marine Recreational Management Area, Sonoma County
- Corte Madera Marsh State Marine Park, Marin County
- Marin Islands State Marine Park, Marin County
- Estero de San Antonio State Marine Recreational Management Area, Marin County
- Point Reyes State Marine Reserve, Marin County
- Point Reyes State Marine Conservation Area, Marin County
- Point Reyes Headlands Special Closure, Marin County
- Estero de Limantour State Marine Reserve, Marin County
- Drakes Estero State Marine Conservation Area, Marin County
- Point Resistance Rock Special Closure, Marin County
- Double Point/Stormy Stack Special Closure, Marin County
- Duxbury Reef State Marine Conservation Area, Marin County
- Fagan Marsh State Marine Park, Napa County
- Peytonia Slough State Marine Park, Solano County
- Albany Mudflats State Marine Park, Alameda County
- Robert W. Crown State Marine Conservation Area, Alameda County
- North Farallon Island State Marine Reserve, San Francisco County
- North Farallon Islands Special Closure, San Francisco County
- Southeast Farallon Island State Marine Reserve, San Francisco County
- Southeast Farallon Island State Marine Conservation Area, San Francisco County
- Southeast Farallon Island Special Closure, San Francisco County
- Egg (Devil's Slide) Rock to Devil's Slide Special Closure, TK County
- Montara State Marine Reserve, San Mateo County
- Pillar Point State Marine Conservation Area, San Mateo County
- Egg (Devil's Slide) Rock to Devil's Slide Special Closure, San Mateo County
- Redwood Shores State Marine Park, San Mateo County
- Bair Island State Marine Park, San Mateo County
- Año Nuevo State Marine Conservation Area, Santa Cruz County
- Greyhound Rock State Marine Conservation Area, Santa Cruz County
- Natural Bridges State Marine Reserve, Santa Cruz County
- Elkhorn Slough State Marine Reserve, Monterey County
- Elkhorn Slough State Marine Conservation Area, Monterey County
- Moro Cojo Slough State Marine Reserve, Monterey County
- Soquel Canyon State Marine Conservation Area, Monterey County
- Portuguese Ledge State Marine Conservation Area, Monterey County
- Edward F. Ricketts State Marine Conservation Area, Monterey County
- Lovers Point State Marine Reserve, Monterey County
- Pacific Grove Marine Gardens State Marine Conservation Area, Monterey County
- Asilomar State Marine Reserve, Monterey County
- Carmel Pinnacles State Marine Reserve, Monterey County
- Carmel Bay State Marine Conservation Area, Monterey County
- Point Lobos State Marine Reserve, Monterey County
- Point Lobos State Marine Conservation Area, Monterey County
- Point Sur State Marine Reserve, Monterey County
- Point Sur State Marine Conservation Area, Monterey County
- Big Creek State Marine Reserve, Monterey County
- Big Creek State Marine Conservation Area, Monterey County
- Piedras Blancas State Marine Reserve, San Luis Obispo County
- Piedras Blancas State Marine Conservation Area, San Luis Obispo County
- Cambria State Marine Conservation Area, San Luis Obispo County
- White Rock (Cambria) State Marine Conservation Area, San Luis Obispo County
- Morro Bay State Marine Reserve, San Luis Obispo County
- Morro Bay State Marine Recreational Management Area, San Luis Obispo County
- Point Buchon State Marine Reserve, San Luis Obispo County
- Point Buchon State Marine Conservation Area, San Luis Obispo County
- Vandenberg State Marine Reserve, Santa Barbara County
- Kashtayit State Marine Conservation Area, Santa Barbara County
- Naples State Marine Conservation Area, Santa Barbara County
- Campus Point State Marine Conservation Area, Santa Barbara County
- Goleta Slough State Marine Conservation Area, Santa Barbara County
- Richardson Rock State Marine Reserve (also Federal Marine Reserve)
- Santa Barbara Island State Marine Reserve (also Federal Marine Reserve), Santa Barbara Island, Santa Barbara County
- Footprint State Marine Reserve (also Federal Marine Reserve)
- Scorpion State Marine Reserve (also Federal Marine Reserve), Santa Cruz Island, Santa Barbara County
- Gull Island State Marine Reserve (also Federal Marine Reserve), Santa Cruz Island, Santa Barbara County
- Painted Cave State Marine Conservation Area, Santa Cruz Island, Santa Barbara County
- South Point State Marine Reserve (also Federal Marine Reserve), Santa Rosa Island, Santa Barbara County
- Skunk Point State Marine Reserve, Santa Rosa Island, Santa Barbara County
- Carrington Point State Marine Reserve, Santa Rosa Island, Santa Barbara County
- Judith Rock State Marine Reserve, San Miguel Island, Santa Barbara County
- San Miguel Island Special Closure, San Miguel Island, Santa Barbara County
- Harris Point State Marine Reserve (also Federal Marine Reserve), San Miguel Island, Santa Barbara County
- Begg Rock State Marine Reserve, Ventura County
- Anacapa State Marine Reserve (also Federal Marine Reserve), Anacapa Island; Ventura County
- Anacapa Island State Marine Conservation Area (also Federal Marine Conservation Area), Anacapa Island, Ventura County
- Anacapa Island Special Closure, Anacapa Island, Ventura County
- Cat Harbor State Marine Conservation Area, Santa Catalina Island, Los Angeles County
- Farnsworth Onshore State Marine Conservation Area, Santa Catalina Island, Los Angeles County
- Farnsworth Offshore State Marine Conservation Area, Santa Catalina Island, Los Angeles County
- Lover's Cove State Marine Conservation Area, Santa Catalina Island, Los Angeles County
- Casino Point State Marine Conservation Area, Santa Catalina Island, Los Angeles County
- Long Point State Marine Reserve, Santa Catalina Island, Los Angeles County
- Blue Cavern Onshore State Marine Conservation Area, Santa Catalina Island, Los Angeles County
- Blue Cavern Offshore State Marine Conservation Area, Santa Catalina Island, Los Angeles County
- Arrow Point to Lion Head Point State Marine Conservation Area, Santa Catalina Island, Los Angeles County
- Point Dume State Marine Conservation Area, Los Angeles County
- Point Dume State Marine Reserve, Los Angeles County
- Point Vicente State Marine Conservation Area, Los Angeles County
- Abalone Cove State Marine Conservation Area, Los Angeles County
- Bolsa Bay State Marine Conservation Area, Orange County
- Bolsa Chica Basin State Marine Conservation Area, Orange County
- Upper Newport Bay State Marine Conservation Area, Orange County
- Crystal Cove State Marine Conservation Area, Orange County
- Laguna Beach State Marine Reserve, Orange County
- Laguna Beach State Marine Conservation Area, Orange County
- Dana Point State Marine Conservation Area, Orange County
- Batiquitos Lagoon State Marine Conservation Area, San Diego County
- Swami's State Marine Conservation Area, San Diego County
- San Elijo Lagoon State Marine Conservation Area, San Diego County
- San Dieguito Lagoon State Marine Conservation Area, San Diego County
- San Diego-Scripps Coastal State Marine Conservation Area, San Diego County
- Matlahuayl State Marine Conservation Area, San Diego County
- South La Jolla State Marine Reserve, San Diego County
- South La Jolla State Marine Conservation Area, San Diego County
- Famosa Slough State Marine Conservation Area, San Diego County
- Cabrillo State Marine Reserve, San Diego County
- Tijuana River Mouth State Marine Conservation Area, San Diego County

=== Areas of Special Biological Significance (ASBS) ===
There are 34 Areas of Special Biological Significance (ASBS) off the coast of California. These are marine areas that "support an unusual variety of aquatic life, and often host unique individual species" that are monitored for water quality by the California State Water Resources Control Board.

- Region 1 – North Coast Regional Water Quality Control Board
  - Pygmy Forest Ecological Staircase Area of Special Biological Significance - Mendocino County
  - Del Mar Landing Ecological Reserve - Sonoma County
  - Gerstle Cove - Sonoma County
  - Bodega Marine Life Refuge - Sonoma County
  - Kelp Beds at Saunders Reef Area of Special Biological Significance - Mendocino County
  - Kelp Beds at Trinidad Head Area of Special Biological Significance - Humboldt County
  - Kings Range National Conservation Area of Special Biological Significance - Humboldt and Mendocino Counties
  - Redwoods National Park Area of Special Biological Significance - Del Norte and Humboldt Counties
- Region 2 – San Francisco Bay Regional Water Quality Control Board
  - James V. Fitzgerald Marine Reserve Area of Special Biological Significance - San Mateo County
  - Farallon Islands Area of Special Biological Significance - San Francisco County
  - Duxbury Reef Reserve and Extension Area of Special Biological Significance - Marin County
  - Point Reyes Headland Reserve and Extension Area of Special Biological Significance - Marin County
  - Double Point Area of Special Biological Significance - Marin County
  - Bird Rock Area of Special Biological Significance - Marin County
- Region 3 – Central Coast Regional Water Quality Control Board
  - Año Nuevo Point and Island Area of Special Biological Significance - San Mateo County
  - Point Lobos Ecological Reserve Area of Special Biological Significance - Monterey County
  - San Miguel, Santa Rosa, and Santa Cruz Islands Area of Special Biological Significance - Santa Barbara County
  - Julia Pfeiffer Burns Underwater Park Area of Special Biological Significance - Monterey County
  - Pacific Grove Marine Gardens Fish Refuge and Hopkins Marine Life Refuge - Monterey County
  - Ocean Area Surrounding the Mouth of Salmon Creek Area of Special Biological Significance - Monterey County
  - Carmel Bay Area of Special Biological Significance
- Region 4 – Los Angeles Regional Water Quality Control Board
  - San Nicolas Island and Begg Rock Area of Special Biological Significance - Ventura County
  - Santa Barbara Island, Santa Barbara County and Anacapa Island Area of Special Biological Significance - Ventura County
  - San Clemente Island Area of Special Biological Significance - Los Angeles County
  - Mugu Lagoon to Latigo Point Area of Special Biological Significance - Los Angeles County
  - Santa Catalina Island Areas of Special Biological Significance - Los Angeles County
    - Subarea One, Isthmus Cove to Catalina Head
    - Subarea Two, North End of Little Harbor to Ben Weston Point
    - Subarea Three, Farnsworth Bank Ecological Reserve
    - Subarea Four, Binnacle Rock to Jewfish Point
- Region 8 - Santa Ana Regional Water Quality Control Board
  - Newport Beach Marine Life Refuge Area of Special Biological Significance - Orange County
  - Irvine Coast Marine Life Refuge Area of Special Biological Significance - Orange County
- Region 9 – San Diego Regional Water Quality Control Board
  - San Diego-La Jolla Ecological Reserve Area of Special Biological Significance - San Diego County
  - Heisler Park Ecological Reserve Area of Special Biological Significance - San Diego County
  - San Diego Marine Life Refuge Area of Special Biological Significance - San Diego County

== See also ==
- Golden Gate Biosphere Network
- List of U.S. National Marine Sanctuaries
- List of California Department of Fish and Wildlife protected areas
- List of California state parks
- Peninsulas of California
- Lagoons of California
- Lighthouses of California
- List of marine protected areas of Oregon
- List of marine protected areas of Washington
- List of marine protected areas of Hawaii
