= Bird Rock State Marine Conservation Area and Blue Cavern State Marine Conservation Areas =

Marine protected areas off California, USA

Bird Rock State Marine Conservation Area and Blue Cavern State Marine Conservation Areas (SMCA) are two contiguous marine protected areas that include offshore, island marine habitat at Catalina Island off California's south coast. The SMCAs covers 7.69 and 2.61 square miles respectively. The SMCAs protect marine life by limiting the removal of marine wildlife from within their borders.

== Activities ==
Bird Rock SMCA prohibits take of all living marine resources except: recreational take of pelagic finfish, including Pacific bonito, by hook-and-line or by spearfishing, white seabass by spearfishing and market squid by hand-held dip net is allowed; commercial take of pelagic finfish by hook-and-line and swordfish by harpoon is allowed.

Blue Cavern SMCA prohibits take of all living marine resources except: take pursuant to maintenance of artificial structures inside the conservation area per any required federal, state and local permits, or as otherwise authorized by the department.

Except as pursuant to Federal law, emergency caused by hazardous weather, or as provided subsection 632(b)(102)(D), it is unlawful to anchor or moor a vessel in the Catalina Marine Science Center Marine Life Refuge (Section 10932, Fish and Game Code). The director of the Catalina Marine Science Center Marine Life Refuge, or any person that the director of the refuge has authorized may anchor or moor a vessel or take, for scientific purposes, any fish or specimen of marine life in the Catalina Marine Science Center Marine Life Refuge under the conditions prescribed in a scientific collecting permit issued by the department.

== History ==
Bird Rock State Marine Conservation Area and Blue Cavern State Marine Conservation Areas are two of 36 new marine protected areas adopted by the California Fish and Game Commission in December, 2010 during the third phase of the Marine Life Protection Act Initiative. The MLPAI is a collaborative public process to create a statewide network of protected areas along California’s coastline.

The south coast’s new marine protected areas were designed by local divers, fishermen, conservationists and scientists who comprised the South Coast Regional Stakeholder Group. Their job was to design a network of protected areas that would preserve sensitive sea life and habitats while enhancing recreation, study and education opportunities.

The south coast marine protected areas went into effect in January, 2012.

== Geography and natural features ==
These two MPAs include and protect diverse marine habitat including dense kelp forests, emergent rock (boiler rocks), sand flats and the myriad species for which they serve as habitat.

Bird Rock SMCA: This area is bounded by the mean high tide line and straight lines connecting the following points in the order listed:

1. 33°27.50′N 118°27.00′W
2. 33°29.97′N 118°27.00′W
3. 33°30.81′N 118°29.30′W
4. 33°27.50′N 118°29.30′W
5. 33°27.50′N 118°27.00′W

Blue Cavern SMCA: This area is bounded by the mean high tide line and straight lines connecting the following points in the order listed:

1. 33°25.96′N 118°27.00′W
2. 33°27.50′N 118°27.00′W
3. 33°27.50′N 118°29.30′W
4. 33°26.64′N 118°29.30′W

== Habitat and wildlife ==
The rocky reef, kelp forest and emergent rock habitats in these MPAs support numerous species of invertebrates, plants, fish and marine mammals; among them are garibaldi, rockfish, octopus, gorgonians, nudibranchs, bat rays, kelp bass and many more.

== Scientific monitoring ==
As specified by the Marine Life Protection Act, select marine protected areas along California’s south coast are being monitored by scientists to track their effectiveness and learn more about ocean health. Similar studies in marine protected areas located off of the Santa Barbara Channel Islands have already detected gradual improvements in fish size and number.

== Appearances in popular culture ==
Bird Rock was featured by Huell Howser in California's Gold Episode 2004.
