= Vandenberg State Marine Reserve =

Marine protected area in California

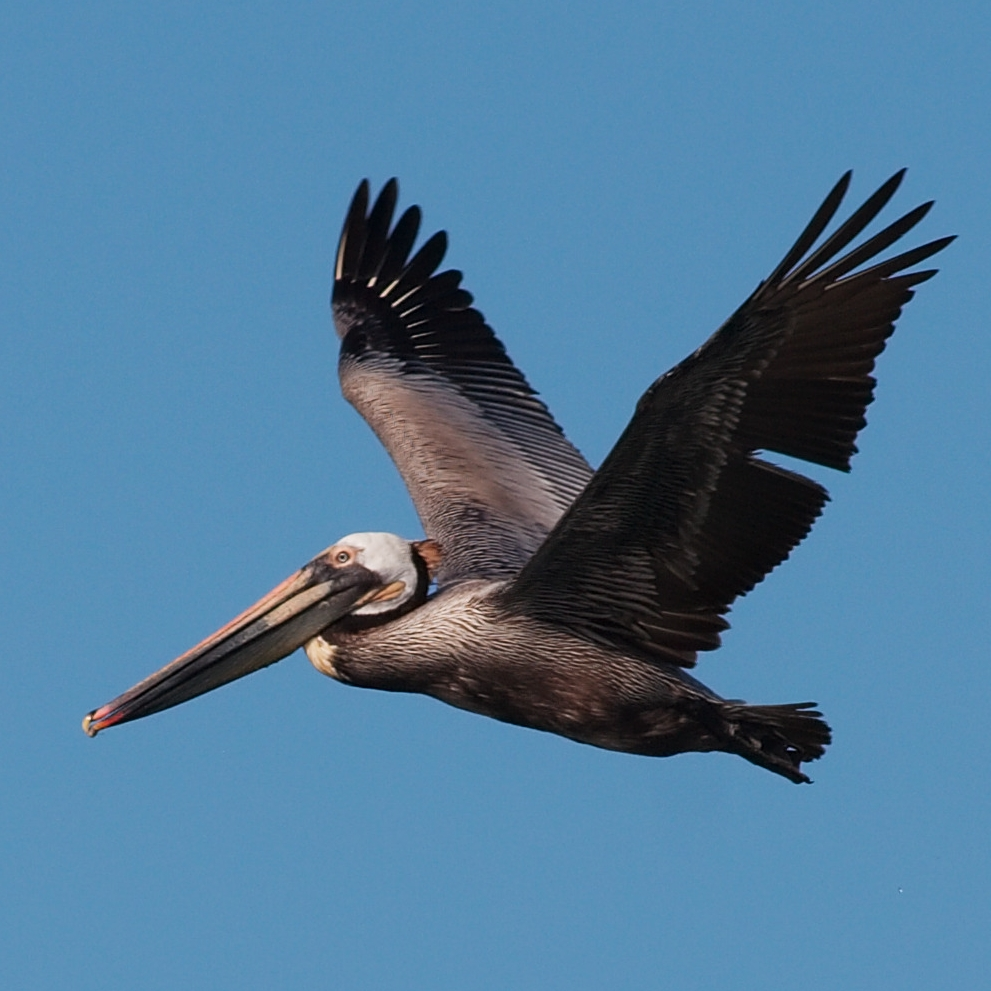
Brown pelican

Vandenberg State Marine Reserve (SMR) is a marine protected area located offshore of Vandenberg Air Force Base, near the city of Lompoc on California's central coast. The marine protected area covers 32.84 square miles (85.1 km^{2}). Vandenberg SMR protects all marine life within its boundaries. Fishing and take of all living marine resources is prohibited.

== History ==
Vandenberg SMR was established in September 2007 by the California Department of Fish and Wildlife. It was one of 29 marine protected areas adopted during the first phase of the Marine Life Protection Act Initiative. The Marine Life Protection Act Initiative (MLPAI) is a collaborative public process to create a statewide network of marine protected areas along the California coastline.

== Geography and natural features ==
This marine protected area is bounded by the mean high tide line and straight lines connecting the following points in the order listed: 34° 44.65' N. lat. 120° 37.75' W. long.; 34° 44.65' N. lat. 120° 40.00' W. long.; 34° 33.25' N. lat. 120° 40.00' W. long.; and 34° 33.25' N. lat. 120° 37.25' W. long.

== Habitat and wildlife ==
The Vandenberg area contains representative reef and sandy habitat as well as rocky cliffs that provide critical nesting habitat for guillemots, cormorants, and oystercatchers, and other seabirds. Forage studies in this area have documented a wide range of fish and invertebrate species associated with reef and sandy bottom habitats as well as the interactions between these prey species and seabirds and marine mammals using this area.

== Recreation and nearby attractions ==
To the north of Vandenberg SMR is Point Sal State Beach, an 80-acre (320,000 m^{2}) park with 1 ½ miles of oceanfront. To the south is Gaviota State Park, a popular place for swimming, fishing and camping.

California's marine protected areas encourage recreational and educational uses of the ocean. Activities such as kayaking, diving, snorkeling, and swimming are allowed unless otherwise restricted.

== Scientific monitoring ==
As specified by the Marine Life Protection Act, select marine protected areas along California's central coast are being monitored by scientists to track their effectiveness and learn more about ocean health. Similar studies in marine protected areas located off of the Santa Barbara Channel Islands have already detected gradual improvements in fish size and number.

Local scientific and educational institutions involved in the monitoring include Stanford University's Hopkins Marine Station, University of California Santa Cruz, Moss Landing Marine Laboratories and Cal Poly San Luis Obispo. Research methods include hook-and-line sampling, intertidal and scuba diver surveys, and the use of Remote Operated Vehicle (ROV) submarines.
