= Abalone Cove State Marine Conservation Area and Point Vicente State Marine Reserve =

Palos Verdes Peninsula natural landmark

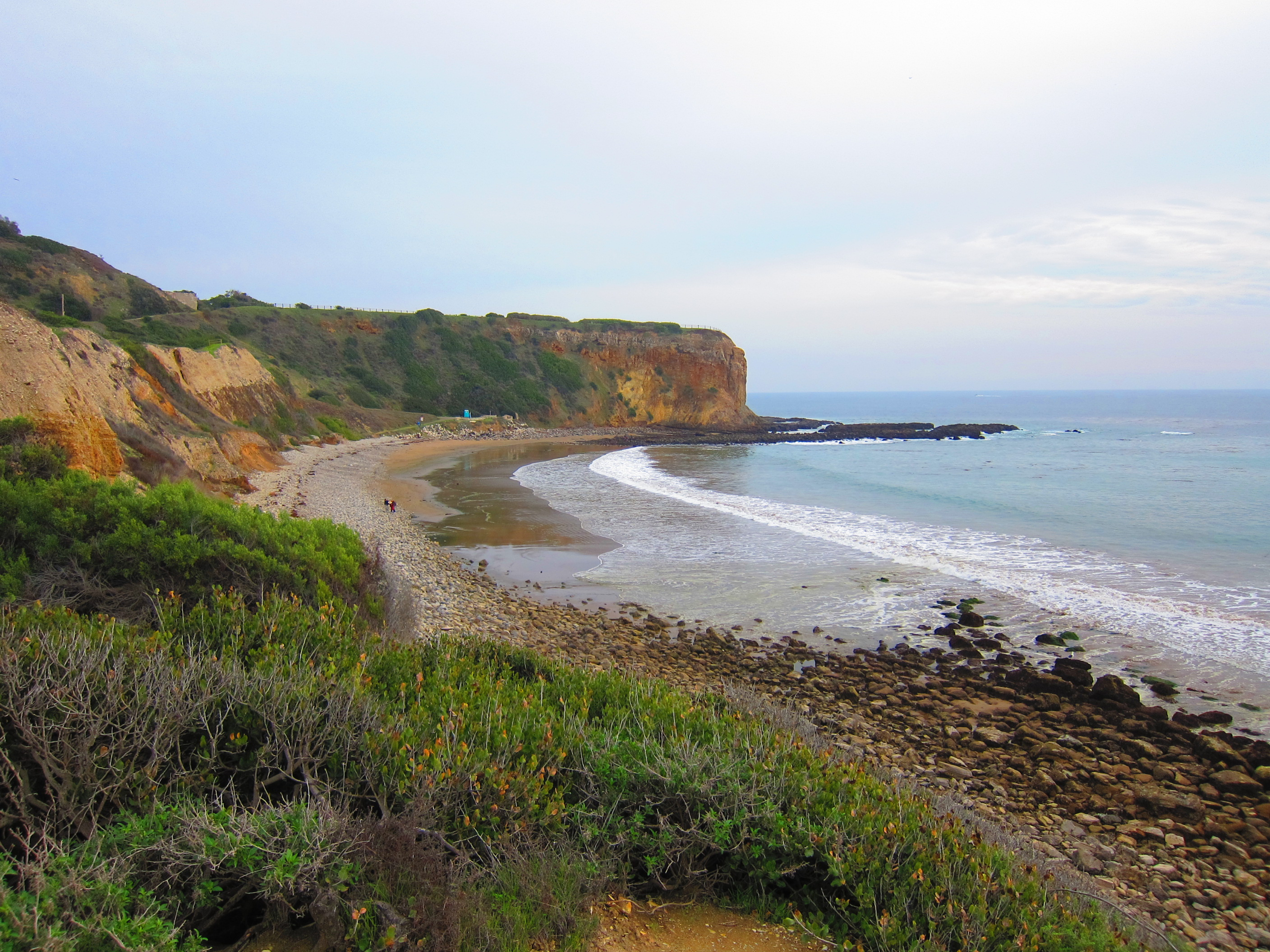
Abalone Cove, Portuguese Bend, Rancho Palos Verdes, California

Abalone Cove State Marine Conservation Area (SMCA) and Point Vicente State Marine Reserve (SMR) are two adjoining marine protected areas that extend offshore in Los Angeles County on California's south coast. The two marine protected areas cover 19.87 sq mi (51.5 km^{2}). The marine protected areas protect natural habitats and marine life by protecting or limiting removal of wildlife from within their boundaries. Point Vicente SMR, prohibits all take of living marine resources. Abalone Cove SMCA, prohibits take of all living marine resources, except recreational take of pelagic finfish, including Pacific bonito and white seabass by spearfishing, market squid by hand-held dip net, commercial take of coastal pelagic species and Pacific bonito by round haul net, and swordfish by harpoon.

Take pursuant to remediation activities associated with the Palos Verdes Shelf Operable Unit of the Montrose Chemical Superfund Site are allowed inside the conservation area per the Interim Record of Decision issued by the United States Environmental Protection Agency and any subsequent Records of Decision.

== History ==
Abalone Cove SMCA and Point Vicente SMR are two of 36 marine protected areas adopted by the California Fish and Game Commission in December, 2010 during the third phase of the Marine Life Protection Act Initiative. The MLPAI is a collaborative public process to create a statewide network of protected areas along California's coastline.

The south coast's new marine protected areas were designed by local divers, fishermen, conservationists and scientists who comprised the South Coast Regional Stakeholder Group. Their job was to design a network of protected areas that would preserve sensitive sea life and habitats while enhancing recreation, study and education opportunities.

The south coast marine protected areas went into effect in January, 2012.

== Geography and natural features ==
Abalone Cove SMCA and Point Vicente SMR are two adjoining marine protected areas that extend offshore in Los Angeles County on California's south coast.

Abalone Cove SMCA is bounded by the mean high tide line and straight lines connecting the following points in the order listed except where noted:

1. 33°44.19′N 118°23.80′W
2. 33°41.16′N 118°23.80′W thence southeastward along the three nautical mile offshore boundary to
3. 33°40.85′N 118°22.50′W and
4. 33°44.24′N 118°22.50′W.

Point Vicente SMR is bounded by the mean high tide line and straight lines connecting the following points in the order listed except where noted:

1. 33°44.80′N 118°24.82′W
2. 33°44.80′N 118°28.93′W thence southeastward along the three nautical mile offshore boundary to
3. 33°41.16′N 118°23.80′W and
4. 33°44.19′N 118°23.80′W.

== Habitat and wildlife ==
Abalone Cove SMCA and Point Vicente SMR protect the only true south-facing headland on California's south coast. Species afforded protection are lobsters, sea urchins, rockfish, and rocky intertidal (tide pool) inhabitants. Habitats include dense kelp forests, extensive and complex rocky reefs, and migration waters for a host of marine mammals. including humpback whales, grey whales and blue whales.

== Recreation and nearby attractions ==
The Point Vicente Interpretive Center offers recreational and educational opportunities to the public and is a famous spot for observing migrating whales from shore, due in part to its high elevation. This area has all the right conditions to attract large whale species: steep, deep drop-off coupled with robust upwelling.

Nearby Point Vicente Lighthouse is a cylindrical style lighthouse constructed in 1926. It is home to a third order Fresnel lens which is still active.

Abalone Cove Ecological Reserve, part of the Portuguese Bend Nature Preserve, features two beaches (Abalone Cove and Sacred Cove), tide pools, bluff top viewing areas and trails. Two promontories, Portuguese and Inspiration Points, frame Sacred Cove with its sea caves, black sand and rare plants. The adjacent parking area and multiple picnic tables add to the options for public enjoyment of the area.

Nearby Long Cove is a popular diving spot featuring 15 – 20 foot pinnacles along the perimeter of a reef. Anemones, gorgonians, sponges, hydroids, rock scallops, tunicates, algae and bryozoans cover the surface of the rocks, while rockfish, sheephead and blacksmith swarm the edges.

Abalone Cove SMCA prohibits the take of all living marine resources except that pelagic finfish including white seabass and bonito may be taken by recreational spearfishing, and swordfish may be taken by commercial harpoon. Sardines, anchovies, mackerel and market squid may be taken by commercial round haul net. Market squid may also be taken by hoopnet. Point Vicente SMR prohibits the take of all living marine resources. However, California's marine protected areas encourage recreational and educational uses of the ocean. Activities such as kayaking, diving, snorkeling and swimming are allowed.

== Scientific monitoring ==
As specified by the Marine Life Protection Act, select marine protected areas along California's south coast are being monitored by scientists to track their effectiveness and learn more about ocean health. Similar studies in marine protected areas located off the Santa Barbara Channel Islands have already detected gradual improvements in fish size and number.

== See also ==
- List of marine protected areas of California
