= Lovers Cove State Marine Conservation Area and Casino Point State Marine Conservation Area =

Marine protected areas on California's coast

Lovers Cove State Marine Conservation Area and Casino Point State Marine Conservation Area (SMCAs) are two nearby marine protected areas that include offshore, island marine habitat on opposite sides of Avalon Harbor, Catalina Island, off California's south coast. The SMCAs cover 0.06 and 0.01 square miles (0.155 and 0.026 km^{2}) respectively. These SMCAs function essentially as dive areas in this popular diving and water sports area. The SMCAs protect marine life by limiting the removal of marine wildlife from within their borders.

== Activities ==
Lover's Cove SMCA prohibits take of all living marine resources, except for recreational take by hook-and-line from the Cabrillo Mole or take pursuant to maintenance of artificial structures inside the conservation area per any required federal, state and local permits, or as otherwise authorized by the department.

Casino Point SMCA prohibits take of all living marine resources, except for take pursuant to maintenance of artificial structures inside the conservation area per any required federal, state and local permits, or as otherwise authorized by the department. Feeding of fish for marine life viewing is allowed.

== History ==
Lover's Cove and Casino Point State Marine Conservation Areas are two of 36 new marine protected areas adopted by the California Fish and Game Commission in December 2010 during the third phase of the Marine Life Protection Act Initiative. The MLPAI is a collaborative public process to create a statewide network of protected areas along California's coastline.

The south coast's new marine protected areas were designed by local divers, fishermen, conservationists and scientists who comprised the South Coast Regional Stakeholder Group. Their job was to design a network of protected areas that would preserve sensitive sea life and habitats while enhancing recreation, study and education opportunities.

The south coast marine protected areas went into effect in 2012.

== Geography and natural features ==
These two MPAs include and protect diverse marine habitat including dense kelp forests, sand flats and the myriad species for which they serve as habitat.

Casino Point SMCA: This area is bounded by the mean high tide line and straight lines connecting the following points in the order listed:

1. 33°20.90′N 118°19.43′W
2. 33°20.90′N 118°19.42′W
3. 33°20.92′N 118°19.38′W
4. 33°20.95′N 118°19.42′W
5. 33°20.97′N 118°19.47′W
6. 33°21.00′N 118°19.52′W
7. 33°20.96′N 118°19.56′W

Lover's Cove SMCA: This area is bounded by the mean high tide line and straight lines connecting the following points in the order listed:

1. 33°20.460′N 118°18.900′W
2. 33°20.711′N 118°18.900′W
3. 33°20.711′N 118°19.321′W

== Habitat and wildlife ==
The rocky reef, kelp forest and emergent rock habitats in these MPAs support numerous species of invertebrates, plants, fish and marine mammals; among them are garibaldi, rockfish, octopus, gorgonians, nudibranchs, bat rays, kelp bass and many more.

== Scientific monitoring ==
As specified by the Marine Life Protection Act, select marine protected areas along California's south coast are being monitored by scientists to track their effectiveness and learn more about ocean health. Similar studies in marine protected areas located off of the Santa Barbara Channel Islands have already detected gradual improvements in fish size and number.
