= Long Point State Marine Reserve =

Marine protected area on California's coast

Long Point State Marine Reserve (SMR) is a marine protected area that includes offshore, island marine habitat off California's south coast. The SMR covers 1.66 square miles (4.3 km^{2}). The SMR protect marine life by prohibiting the removal of marine wildlife from within its borders. Long Point SMR prohibits take of all living marine resources.

Please see the following for official details on boundaries, regulations and other information:

== History ==
Long Point SMR is one of 36 new marine protected areas adopted by the California Fish and Game Commission in December, 2010 during the third phase of the Marine Life Protection Act Initiative. The MLPAI is a collaborative public process to create a statewide network of protected areas along California's coastline.

The south coast's new marine protected areas were designed by local divers, fishermen, conservationists and scientists who comprised the South Coast Regional Stakeholder Group. Their job was to design a network of protected areas that would preserve sensitive sea life and habitats while enhancing recreation, study and education opportunities.

The south coast marine protected areas went into effect in 2012.

== Geography and natural features ==
This MPA includes and protect diverse marine habitat including dense kelp forests, and flats and the myriad species for which they serve as habitat. The SMR includes the famous "Italian Gardens" scuba dive site.

This area is bounded by straight lines connecting the following points in the order listed except where noted:

1. 33°24.38′N 118°21.98′W
2. 33°25.50′N 118°21.98′W
3. 33°25.50′N 118°24.00′W and
4. 33°25.11′N 118°24.00′W.

== Habitat and wildlife ==
The rocky reef and kelp forest habitats in these MPAs support numerous species of invertebrates, plants, fish and marine mammals; among them are garibaldi, rockfish, octopus, gorgonians, nudibranchs, bat rays, kelp bass and many more. Long Point SMR is one of the best places in the world to see the rare giant black sea bass.

== Scientific monitoring ==
As specified by the Marine Life Protection Act, select marine protected areas along California's south coast are being monitored by scientists to track their effectiveness and learn more about ocean health. Similar studies in marine protected areas located off of the Santa Barbara Channel Islands have already detected gradual improvements in fish size and number.
