= Swami's State Marine Conservation Area =

Marine protected area

Swami's State Marine Conservation Area (SMCA) is a marine protected area that extends offshore of Encinitas in San Diego County on California’s south coast. The SMCA covers 12.71 square miles. It protects marine life by limiting the removal of marine wildlife from within its borders.

Swami's SMCA prohibits take of all living marine resources except: recreational take by hook-and-line from shore and recreational take of pelagic finfish, including Pacific bonito and white seabass, by spearfishing. Take pursuant to beach nourishment and other sediment management activities and operation and maintenance of artificial structures inside the conservation area is allowed per any required federal, state and local permits, or as otherwise authorized by the department.

== History ==
Swami’s SMCA is one of 36 new marine protected areas adopted by the California Fish and Game Commission in December, 2010 during the third phase of the Marine Life Protection Act Initiative. The MLPA is a collaborative public process to create a statewide network of protected areas along California’s coastline.

The south coast’s new marine protected areas were heavily protested by local divers and fishermen while being designed by conservationists and scientists who comprised the South Coast Regional Stakeholder Group (SRSG). Their job was to design a network of protected areas that would preserve sensitive sea life and habitats while enhancing recreation, study and education opportunities.

Controversy over the Swami's SMCA stemmed from a long sustainable fishing history going back to the Cardiff Dorymen who launched small wooden boats from the Cardiff Reef and Noonan's Point (now call Swami's) beaches. Local divers and fishermen protested the creation of these protected areas. However, the state of California listened to the input from residents, families and experts across the area, and the site was finally protected for future generations. Today, there are signs that marine life are recovering in part due to protections afforded by this MPA.

The south coast marine protected areas went into effect in 2012. No signage was posted for 2 years from effective date on the Northern or Southern borders to create a clear border of the Swami's SMCA.

== Geography and natural features ==
Swami’s SMCA is a marine protected area that extends offshore in San Diego County on California’s south coast.

Swami’s SMCA is bounded by the mean high tide line and straight lines connecting the following points in the order listed except where noted:

1. 33°02.900′N 117°17.927′W
2. 33°02.900′N 117°21.743′W thence southward along the three nautical mile

offshore boundary to

1. 33°00.000′N 117°20.398′W and
2. 33°00.000′N 117°16.698′W thence northward along the mean high tide line onshore boundary to
3. 33°00.962′N 117°16.850′W and
4. 33°00.980′N 117°16.857′W.

== Habitat and wildlife ==
Swami’s SMCA contains a concentration of rocky reef, kelp forest/surf grass habitat, and local marine species. With large stretches of sand with little or no reef immediately to the North and South, marine species aggregate to the rocky reefs and kelp beds of the Swami's SMCA. California Spiny Lobster are plentiful throughout the entire MPA. Halibut frequent the finger reefs of in front of the campgrounds especially during the weeks of Grunion running.

Swami’s SMCA protects marine life within its boundaries. The take of all living marine resources is prohibited except: 1. Recreational take by hook-and-line from shore is allowed; 2. The recreational take by spearfishing of white seabass and pelagic finfish is allowed, and; 3. Take pursuant to beach nourishment and other sediment management activities and operation and maintenance of artificial structures inside the conservation area is allowed per any required federal, state and local permits, or as otherwise authorized by the department.

However, California’s marine protected areas encourage recreational and educational uses of the ocean. Activities such as kayaking, diving, snorkeling, surfing and swimming are allowed unless otherwise restricted.

== Scientific monitoring ==
As specified by the Marine Life Protection Act, select marine protected areas along California's coast are being monitored by scientists to track their effectiveness and learn more about ocean health. Without a MPA specific baseline or any single species identified as threatened in the Swami's SMCA, scientific studies will be gathering new information. Similar studies in marine protected areas located off of the Santa Barbara Channel Islands have already detected gradual improvements in fish size and number as expected with an area closure.

== See also ==
- List of marine protected areas of California
