= Point Dume State Marine Conservation Area =

Marine protected area in California, US

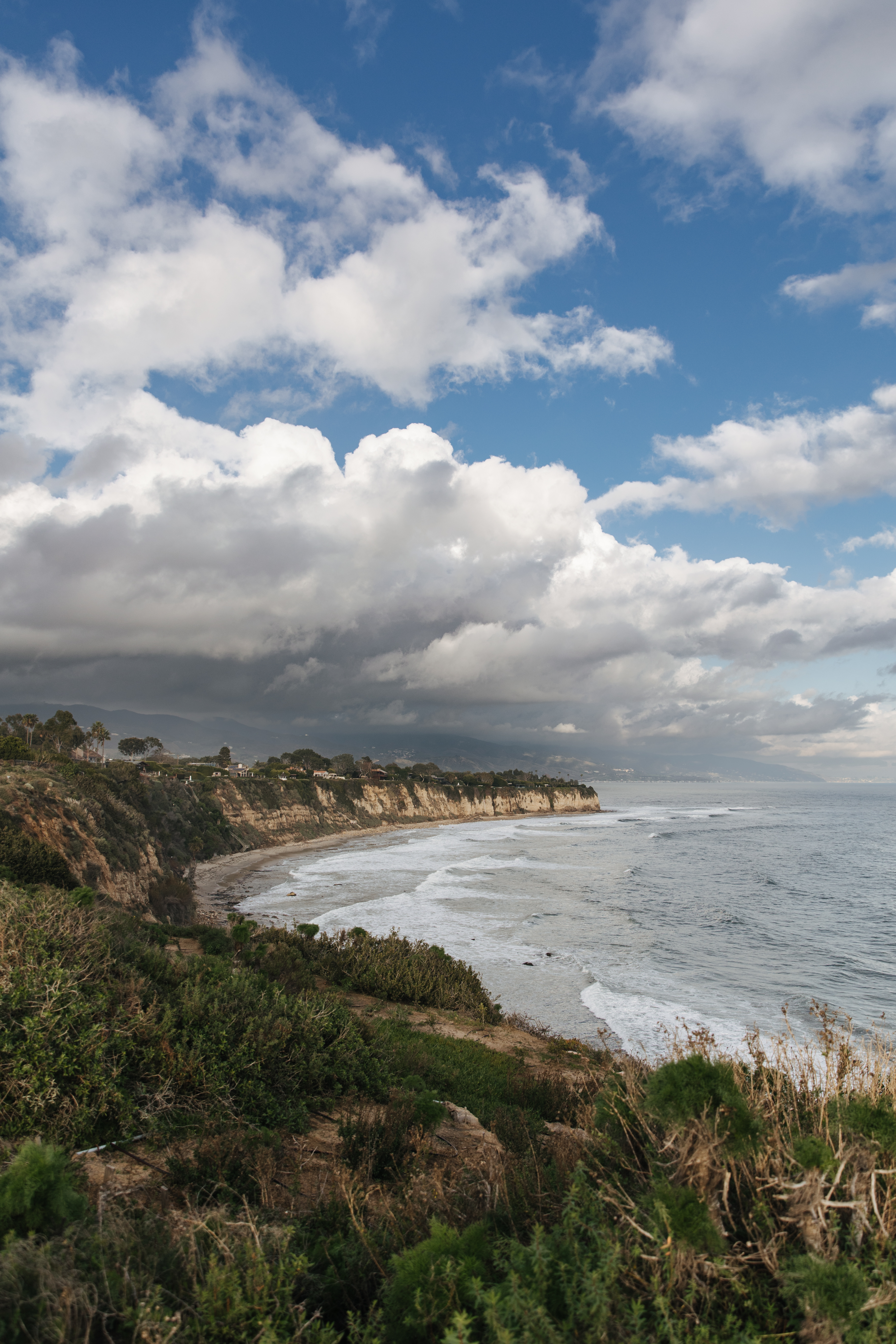
Point Dume coastal cliffs above Pacific Ocean in Malibu, California

Point Dume State Marine Conservation Area (SMCA) and Point Dume State Marine Reserve (SMR) are two adjoining marine protected areas that extend offshore in Los Angeles County on California's south coast. Together, the areas cover 23.28 square miles (60.3 km^{2}), protecting natural habitats and marine life by protecting or limiting removal of wildlife from within their boundaries.

Point Dume SMR prohibits the taking of all living marine resource.

In Point Dume SMCA, the taking of all living marine resources is prohibited except: pelagic finfish, including white seabass and bonito, may be taken by recreational spearfishing, and swordfish may be taken by commercial harpoon. Sardines, anchovies, mackerel, and market squid may be taken by commercial roundhaul net. Take pursuant to beach nourishment and other sediment management activities is allowed inside the conservation area pursuant to any required federal, state, and local permits, or as otherwise authorized by the department. Please see the following for official details on boundaries, regulations and other information:

== History ==
Point Dume SMCA and SMR are two of 36 new marine protected areas adopted by the California Fish and Game Commission in December, 2010 during the third phase of the Marine Life Protection Act Initiative. The MLPAI is a collaborative public process to create a statewide network of protected areas along California's coastline.

The south coast's new marine protected areas were designed by local divers, fishermen, conservationists and scientists who comprised the South Coast Regional Stakeholder Group. Their job was to design a network of protected areas that would preserve sensitive sea life and habitats while enhancing recreation, study and education opportunities.

The south coast marine protected areas went into effect in 2012.

== Geography and natural features ==
Point Dume SMCA and SMR are two adjoining marine protected areas that extend offshore in Los Angeles County on California's south coast.

Point Dume SMCA is bounded by the mean high tide line and straight lines connecting the following points in the order listed:

1. 34°02.28′N 118°53.00′W
2. 34°59.14′N 118°53.00′W thence southeastward along the three nautical mile offshore boundary to
3. 34°56.96′N 118°49.20′W and
4. 34°00.76′N 118°49.20′W.

Point Dume SMR is bounded by the mean high tide line and straight lines connecting the following points in the order listed:

1. 34°00.76′N 118°49.20′W
2. 33°56.96′N 118°49.20′W thence eastward along the three nautical mile offshore boundary to
3. 33°57.06′N 118°47.26′W and
4. 34°01.20′N 118°47.26′W.

== Habitat and wildlife ==
Point Dume SMCA and Point Dume SMR are located in an area that encompasses some of the most diverse habitats in Los Angeles County, including an upwelling zone, submarine canyon habitat, unique spur and groove reef structures, extensive kelp, and diverse understory algal habitat. This is an area of high species diversity.

== Recreation and nearby attractions ==
Adjacent to the marine protected areas are Point Dume State Preserve and Point Dume State Beach. Point Dume State Preserve features headlands, cliffs, rocky coves and vast beach access. Point Dume is a perfect place to watch for California gray whales during the December–March migration period.

Point Dume Beach and nearby Zuma County Beach are noted for swimming, surfing, scuba diving and fishing. Escondido Beach, also nearby, is a popular spot for kayak fishing.

Zuma Wetlands is a small freshwater marsh and creek situated just north of Point Dume. The wetlands had historically served as a wildlife corridor and nesting site for a variety of birds and small mammals but had been reduced by construction and other human activities. The area was restored in 2000, resulting in an unusually diverse and highly valuable habitat for wildlife. Just to the east is Paradise Cove, a popular beach restaurant and pier.

Point Dume SMCA prohibits the take of all living marine resources except that pelagic finfish, including white seabass and bonito, may be taken by recreational spearfishing, and swordfish may be taken by commercial harpoon. Sardines, anchovies, mackerel and market squid may be taken by commercial roundhaul net. Point Dume SMR prohibits the take of all living marine resources. However, California's marine protected areas encourage recreational and educational uses of the ocean. Activities such as kayaking, diving, snorkeling, and swimming are allowed.

== Scientific monitoring ==
As specified by the Marine Life Protection Act, select marine protected areas along California's south coast are being monitored by scientists to track their effectiveness and learn more about ocean health. Similar studies in marine protected areas located off of the Santa Barbara Channel Islands have already detected gradual improvements in fish size and number.

== See also ==
- List of marine protected areas of California
