= Dana Point State Marine Conservation Area =

Marine protected area off the coast of Orange County, CA

Dana Point State Marine Conservation Area

Dana Point State Marine Conservation Area(SMCA) is one of four adjoining marine protected areas off the coast of Orange County, CA, on California’s South Coast. By itself, the SMCA measures 3.45 square miles. The SMCA protects marine life by limiting the removal of marine wildlife from within its borders, including tide pools. Dana Point SMCA prohibits take of living marine resources except: only the following species may be taken recreationally below the mean lower low tide line only: finfish by hook-and-line or by spearfishing, and lobster and sea urchin. The commercial take of coastal pelagic species by round haul net, and spiny lobster and sea urchin only is allowed.

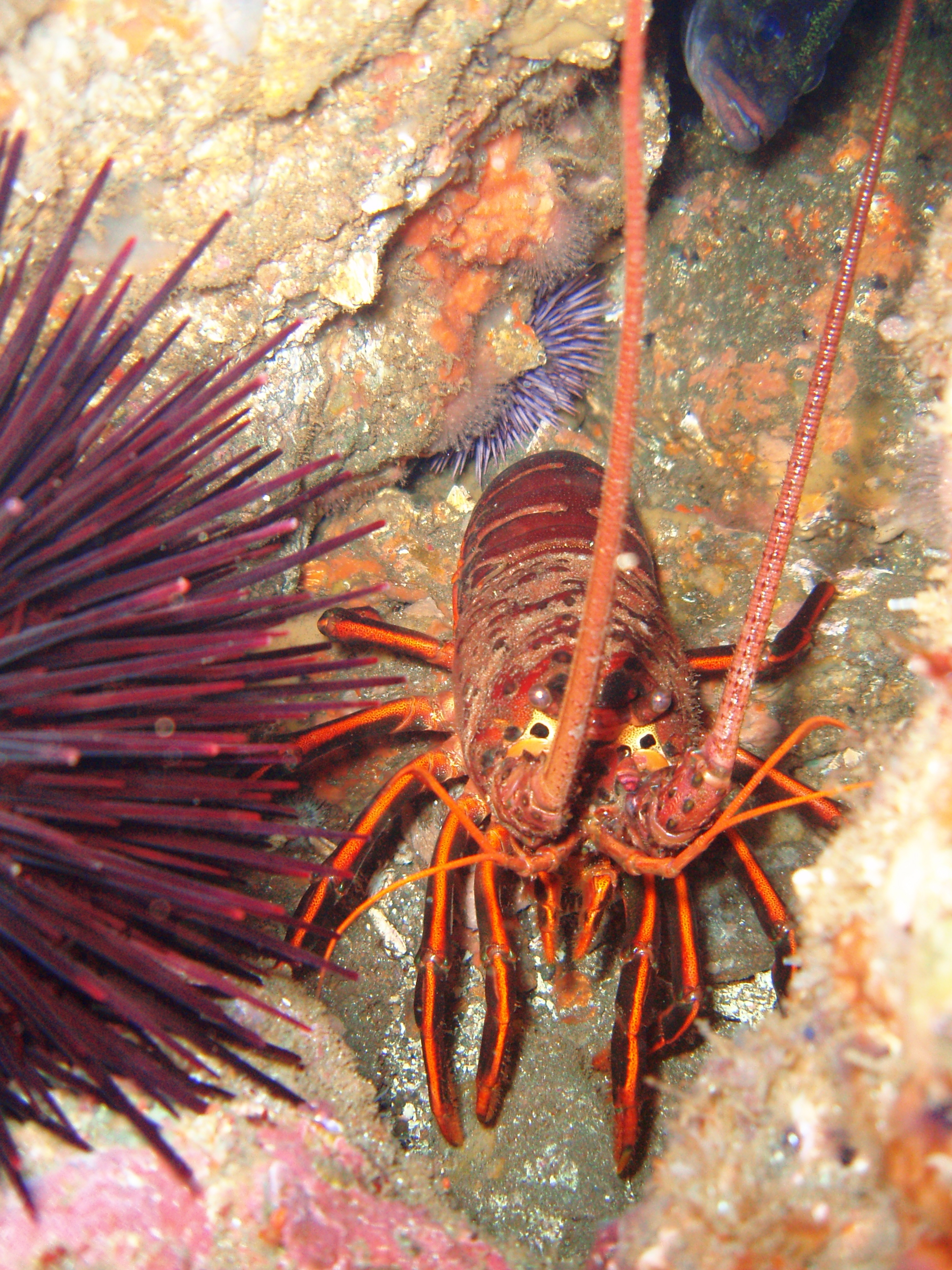
Spiny lobster

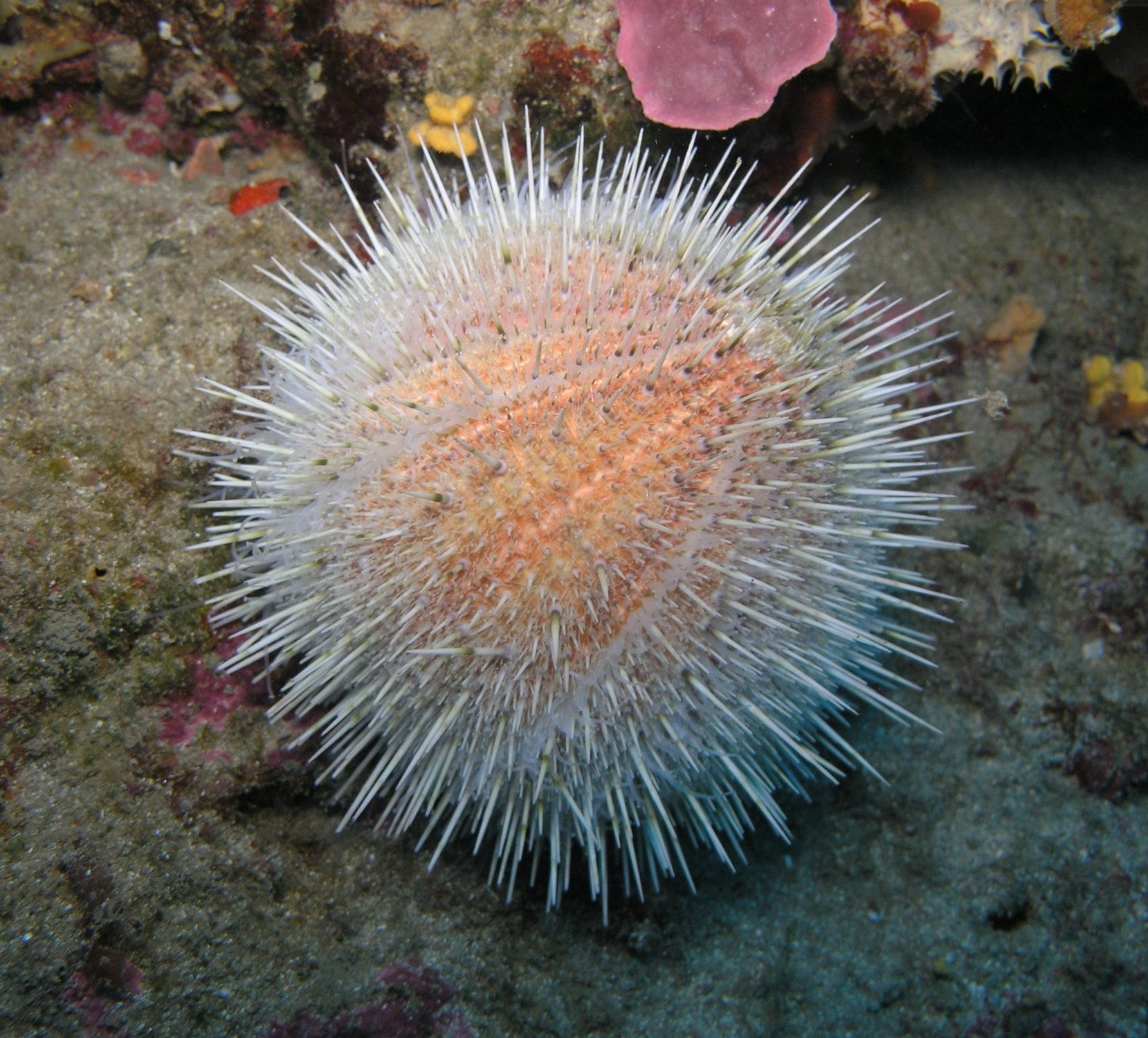
Sea Urchin

Dana Point's 7.5 miles of coastline consists of a myriad of marine habitats. Animals and plants alike are suited to sandy beaches, rocky intertidal and kelp forest ecosystems found in Dana Point.

Take pursuant to operation and maintenance of artificial structures inside the conservation area is allowed per any required federal, state and local permits, or as otherwise authorized by the department.

Removal of all living marine resources from inside tidepools is prohibited. For purposes of this section, tidepools are defined as the area encompassing the rocky pools that are filled with seawater due to retracting tides between the mean higher high tide line and the mean lower low tide line. Please see the following for official details on boundaries, regulations and other information:

== History ==
Dana Point SMCA is one of 36 new marine protected areas adopted by the California Fish and Game Commission in December, 2010 during the third phase of the Marine Life Protection Act Initiative. The MLPAI is a collaborative public process to create a statewide network of protected areas along California’s coastline. This initiative modified, updated and reorganized the MPAs along the shoreline of southern Orange County.

The south coast’s new marine protected areas were designed by local divers, fishermen, conservationists and scientists who comprised the South Coast Regional Stakeholder Group. Their job was to design a network of protected areas that would preserve sensitive sea life and habitats while enhancing recreation, study and education opportunities.

The south coast marine protected areas went into effect in 2012.

== Geography and natural features ==
Dana Point SMCA is a marine protected area that includes the nearshore area off the area between Laguna Beach and Dana Point in Orange County on California’s south coast.

Boundary: This area is bounded by the mean high tide line and straight lines connecting the following points in the order listed:

1. 33°30.050′N 117°44.771′W
2. 33°30.050′N 117°46.000′W
3. 33°30.000′N 117°46.000′W
4. 33°27.300′N 117°43.300′W
5. 33°27.478′N 117°42.276′W and
6. 33°27.622′N 117°42.425′W.

== Habitat and wildlife ==
Dana Point SMCA protects kelp forest/surf grass and rocky reef habitat and associated species. It provides protection of intertidal invertebrate species such as Kellet's whelks, top shells, limpets and sea cucumbers and abalone while allowing lobster and urchin and finfish take.

== Recreation and nearby attractions ==
Spanning the scenic shoreline of south Orange County from south of Newport Beach to the Dana Point Harbor, the south Orange County MPA complexes sit amongst some of southern California’s most visited coastal recreation amenities. Miles of sandy beaches, coves and points, and blufftop hiking trails are available for beachcombing, wading, surfing, snorkeling and kayaking. To the north, Crystal Cove State Beach abuts the Crystal Cove State Marine Conservation Area, providing access trails, interpretative signage and kiosks, along with restrooms and visitor facilities. Popular scuba diving and snorkeling spots also dot the State Park’s coastline. Laguna Beach SMR sits among numerous sandy coves with dramatic rock formations and fascinating tidepools, along with famous surfing spots such as Aliso Beach, Doheney, and Salt Creek. Throughout this area, collecting living marine resources from the intertidal area is prohibited to preserve wildlife, while some fishing opportunities are available offshore along the Crystal Cove and Dana Point coastline outside the Laguna Beach SMR and SMCA.

Inland, both Crystal Cove State Park and Aliso Canyon Regional Park offer hiking and picnicking opportunities within their protected borders. Visitor services including fine dining and refreshments, lodging, museums and other visitor attractions abound within this urban and tourist-friendly area. The City of Laguna beach is a top southern California tourist attraction, hosting art galleries and beachside restaurants.

== Scientific monitoring ==
As specified by the Marine Life Protection Act, select marine protected areas along California’s south coast are being monitored by scientists to track their effectiveness and learn more about ocean health. Similar studies in marine protected areas located off of the Santa Barbara Channel Islands have already detected gradual improvements in fish size and number.

== See also ==
- List of marine protected areas of California
