= Batiquitos Lagoon State Marine Conservation Area =

Marine protected area in California

Batiquitos Lagoon State Marine Conservation Area (SMCA) is a marine protected area in San Diego on California’s south coast. It is part of Batiquitos Lagoon, a coastal tidal wetland lying within the city limits of Carlsbad, and adjacent to Encinitas. The SMCA covers 2000 miles. It protects marine life by limiting the removal of marine wildlife from within its borders.

== Activities ==
Batiquitos Lagoon SMCA prohibits take of all living marine resources except for take pursuant to operation and maintenance, habitat restoration, research and education, maintenance dredging and maintenance of artificial structures inside the conservation area per any required federal, state and local permits, or activities pursuant to Section 630, or as otherwise authorized by the department. Boating, swimming, wading, and diving are prohibited within the conservation area.

== History ==
Batiquitos Lagoon SMCA is one of 36 new marine protected areas adopted by the California Department of Fish and Wildlife in December, 2010 during the third phase of the Marine Life Protection Act Initiative. The MLPAI is a collaborative public process to create a statewide network of protected areas along California’s coastline. The new marine protected areas were designated by local divers, fishermen, conservationists and scientists who comprised the South Coast Regional Stakeholder Group. Their job was to design a network of protected areas that would preserve sensitive sea life and habitats while enhancing recreation, study and education opportunities. The south coast marine protected areas went into effect in 2012.

== Geography and natural features ==
Batiquitos Lagoon State Marine Conservation includes the waters below the mean high tide line within Batiquitos Lagoon eastward of the Interstate Highway 5 bridge, approximated by a line between the following two points: 33°05.44′N 117°18.12′W and 33°05.46′N 117°18.13′W.

== Habitat and wildlife ==
This area protects important estuarine habitat and associated species.

== Recreation and nearby attractions ==
The coastline of Encinitas and nearby cities of Cardiff and Solana Beach offer ocean-view paths for bike riding. Swami’s beach connects with several miles of uninterrupted beaches, from the San Elijo Lagoon inlet to South Carlsbad Beach jetty. The area is popular for walking and jogging. Nearby cities offer shops, boutiques, restaurants, bed and breakfasts, and golfing.

== Scientific monitoring ==
As specified by the Marine Life Protection Act, select marine protected areas along California’s south coast are being monitored by scientists to track their effectiveness and learn more about ocean health. Similar studies in marine protected areas located off of the Santa Barbara Channel Islands have already detected gradual improvements in fish size and number.

== See also ==
- List of marine protected areas of California
