= San Elijo Lagoon State Marine Conservation Area =

Marine protected area in Califormnia

San Elijo Lagoon SMCA (SMCA) is a marine protected area that protects the lagoon near Encinitas in San Diego County on California’s south coast. The SMCA covers 0.44 square miles (1.1 km^{2}). The SMCA protects marine by limiting the removal of marine wildlife from within its borders. San Elijo SMCA prohibits take of all living marine resources except operation and maintenance, maintenance dredging, habitat restoration including sediment deposition, research and education, and maintenance of artificial structures inside the conservation area per any required federal, state and local permits, or activities pursuant to Section 632, or as otherwise authorized by the department.

Boating, swimming, wading, and diving are prohibited within the conservation area.

== History ==
San Elijo Lagoon SMCA is one of 36 new marine protected areas adopted by the California Fish and Game Commission in December 2010 during the third phase of the Marine Life Protection Act Initiative. The MLPAI is a collaborative public process to create a statewide network of protected areas along California's coastline.

The south coast's new marine protected areas were designed by local divers, fishermen, conservationists and scientists who comprised the South Coast Regional Stakeholder Group. Their job was to design a network of protected areas that would preserve sensitive sea life and habitats while enhancing recreation, study and education opportunities.

The south coast marine protected areas went into effect in 2012.

== Geography and natural features ==
San Elijo Lagoon SMCA is a marine protected area that protects estuarine waters in San Diego County on California's south coast.

This area includes the waters below the mean high tide line within San Elijo Lagoon southeastward of a straight line between the following two points:

1. 33°00.980′N 117°16.857′W
2. 33°00.962′N 117°16.850′W

== Habitat and wildlife ==
This area protects regionally important wetland and estuarine habitats and associated wildlife.

== Scientific monitoring ==
As specified by the Marine Life Protection Act, select marine protected areas along California's south coast are being monitored by scientists to track their effectiveness and learn more about ocean health. Similar studies in marine protected areas located off of the Santa Barbara Channel Islands have already detected gradual improvements in fish size and number.

== See also ==
- List of marine protected areas of California
