= Goleta Slough State Marine Conservation Area =

Marine protected area in California

Coordinates: 34.4189°N 119.8403°W

Goleta Slough State Marine Conservation Area (SMCA) is a marine protected area in Goleta in Santa Barbara County on California's south coast. The SMCA covers 0.25 square miles (0.65 km^{2}). The SMCA protects marine life by limiting the removal of marine wildlife from within its borders. Goleta Slough SMCA prohibits take of all living marine resources except for take pursuant to routine maintenance, dredging, habitat restoration, research and education, maintenance of artificial structures, and operation and maintenance of existing facilities in the conservation area per any required federal, state and local permits, or activities pursuant to Section 630, or as otherwise authorized by the department.

== Activities ==
In waters below the mean high tide line inside the Goleta Slough Ecological Reserve as defined within Section 630, the following restrictions apply:

Boating, swimming, wading, and diving are prohibited. No person shall enter this area and remain therein except on established trails, paths or other designated areas except department employees or designated employees of Santa Barbara Airport, City of Santa Barbara, Goleta Sanitary District and Goleta Valley Vector Control District for the purposes of carrying out official duties.

== History ==
Goleta Slough SMCA is one of 36 new marine protected areas adopted by the California Fish and Game Commission in December, 2010 during the third phase of the Marine Life Protection Act Initiative. The MLPAI is a collaborative public process to create a statewide network of protected areas along California's coastline.

The south coast's new marine protected areas were designed by local divers, fishermen, conservationists and scientists who comprised the South Coast Regional Stakeholder Group. Their job was to design a network of protected areas that would preserve sensitive sea life and habitats while enhancing recreation, study and education opportunities.

The south coast marine protected areas went into effect in 2012.

== Geography and natural features ==
Goleta Slough SMCA is a marine protected area in Santa Barbara County on California's south coast.

This area includes the waters below the mean high tide line within Goleta Slough northward of latitude 34° 25.02' N.

== Habitat and wildlife ==
Protect an important slough and wetland system and associated species.

== Recreation and nearby attractions ==
The scenic University of California, Santa Barbara is a coastal attraction of its own, featuring miles of sandy beaches, a semi-enclosed lagoon and the school's world-class Marine Science Institute. Access to the coast along this fully marine protected area is available from Goleta Beach County Park, various coastal access points on University property (parking fees apply), staircases and trails in the community of Isla Vista, and from the Ellwood Beach area of Goleta, California. Each area offers excellent beachgoing, swimming, surfing and other beach and surf recreational opportunities. Off Isla Vista and towards Coal Oil Point, snorkeling and diving are excellent. A large open space adjoining the west edge of Isla Vista connects with the University's Coal Oil Point Reserve, offering spectacular open coastal views with hiking and picnicking opportunities. The dunes and blufftop here are part of an elaborate restoration effort, including a docent program to protect and interpret the nesting area of rare snowy plover shorebirds.

Goleta Beach is home to the Beachside Bar and Grill, and Isla Vista offers many student-oriented eateries, services and businesses. Kayaking rentals are available in season at Goleta Beach.

== Scientific monitoring ==
As specified by the Marine Life Protection Act, select marine protected areas along California's south coast are being monitored by scientists to track their effectiveness and learn more about ocean health. Similar studies in marine protected areas located off of the Santa Barbara Channel Islands have already detected gradual improvements in fish size and number.

== See also ==
- List of marine protected areas of California
