= Farnsworth Onshore and Farnsworth Offshore State Marine Conservation Areas =

Marine protected areas on California's coast

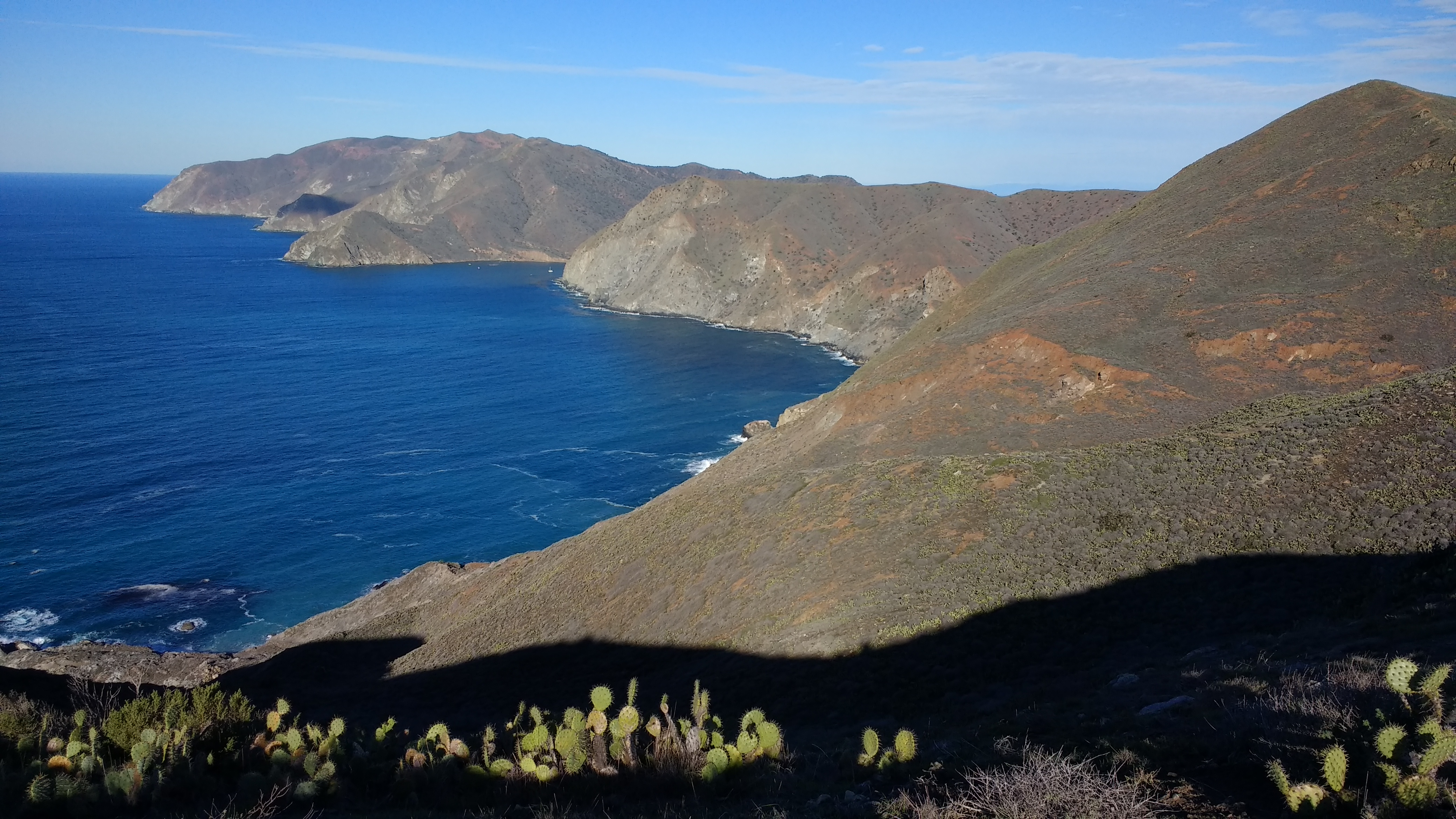
Farnswoth MCAs lie to the south of Little Harbor on the southwest side of Santa Catalina Island, California.

Farnsworth Onshore and Farnsworth Offshore State Marine Conservation Areas (SMCAs) are two contiguous marine protected areas that include offshore, island marine habitat off California's south coast. The SMCAs covers 2.57 sq mi (6.7 km^{2}) and 6.67 sq mi (17.3 km^{2}) respectively. The SMCAs protect marine life by limiting the removal of marine wildlife from within their borders.

Farnsworth Onshore SMCA prohibits take of all living marine resources except: recreational take of pelagic finfish, including Pacific bonito, and white seabass by spearfishing, market squid by hand-held dip net, and marlin, tunas, and dorado (dolphinfish) (Coryphaena hippurus) by trolling is allowed; commercial take of coastal pelagic species by round haul net and swordfish by harpoon is allowed.

Take means pursue, catch, capture, or kill, or attempt to pursue, catch, capture, or kill.

Farnsworth Offshore SMCA prohibits take of all living marine resources except: Recreational take of pelagic finfish, including Pacific bonito, by hook-and-line or by spearfishing, white seabass by spearfishing, market squid by hand-held dip net, and marlin, tunas and dorado (dolphinfish) (Coryphaena hippurus) by trolling is allowed. Commercial take of coastal pelagic species by round haul net, and swordfish by harpoon only is allowed.

== History ==
Farnsworth Onshore and Farnsworth Offshore State Marine Conservation Areas are two of 36 marine protected areas adopted by the California Fish and Game Commission in December, 2010 during the third phase of the Marine Life Protection Act Initiative. The MLPAI is a collaborative public process to create a statewide network of protected areas along California's coastline.

The south coast's new marine protected areas were designed by local divers, fishermen, conservationists and scientists who comprised the South Coast Regional Stakeholder Group. Their job was to design a network of protected areas that would preserve sensitive sea life and habitats while enhancing recreation, study and education opportunities.

The south coast marine protected areas went into effect in 2012.

== Geography and natural features ==
These two MPAs include and protect diverse marine habitat including dense kelp forests, emergent rock (boiler rocks), sand flats and the myriad species for which they serve as habitat.

Farnsworth Onshore SMCA: This area is bounded by the mean high tide line and straight lines connecting the following points in the order listed:

1. 33°21.00′N 118°29.08′W
2. 33°21.00′N 118°30.00′W
3. 33°19.00′N 118°29.00′W
4. 33°19.00′N 118°27.90′W and
5. 33°19.56′N 118°27.90′W.

Farnsworth Offshore SMCA: This area is bounded by straight lines connecting the following points in the order listed except where noted:

1. 33°21.00′N 118°30.00′W
2. 33°21.00′N 118°32.88′W thence southward along the three nautical mile offshore boundary to
3. 33°19.00′N 118°31.98′W and
4. 33°19.00′N 118°29.00′W.

== Habitat and wildlife ==
The rocky reef, kelp forest and emergent rock habitats in these MPAs support numerous species of invertebrates, plants, fish and marine mammals; among them are garibaldi, rockfish, octopus, gorgonians, nudibranchs, bat rays, kelp bass and many more. Farnsworth Offshore SMCA contains the Farnsworth Bank, a deepwater pinnacle site featuring rare purple hydrocoral. This is a well known, advanced scuba dive site.

== Scientific monitoring ==
As specified by the Marine Life Protection Act, select marine protected areas along California’s south coast are being monitored by scientists to track their effectiveness and learn more about ocean health. Similar studies in marine protected areas located off of the Santa Barbara Channel Islands have already detected gradual improvements in fish size and number.

== Introduction of species ==
Releasing any species of fish, wildlife, or plants is prohibited.

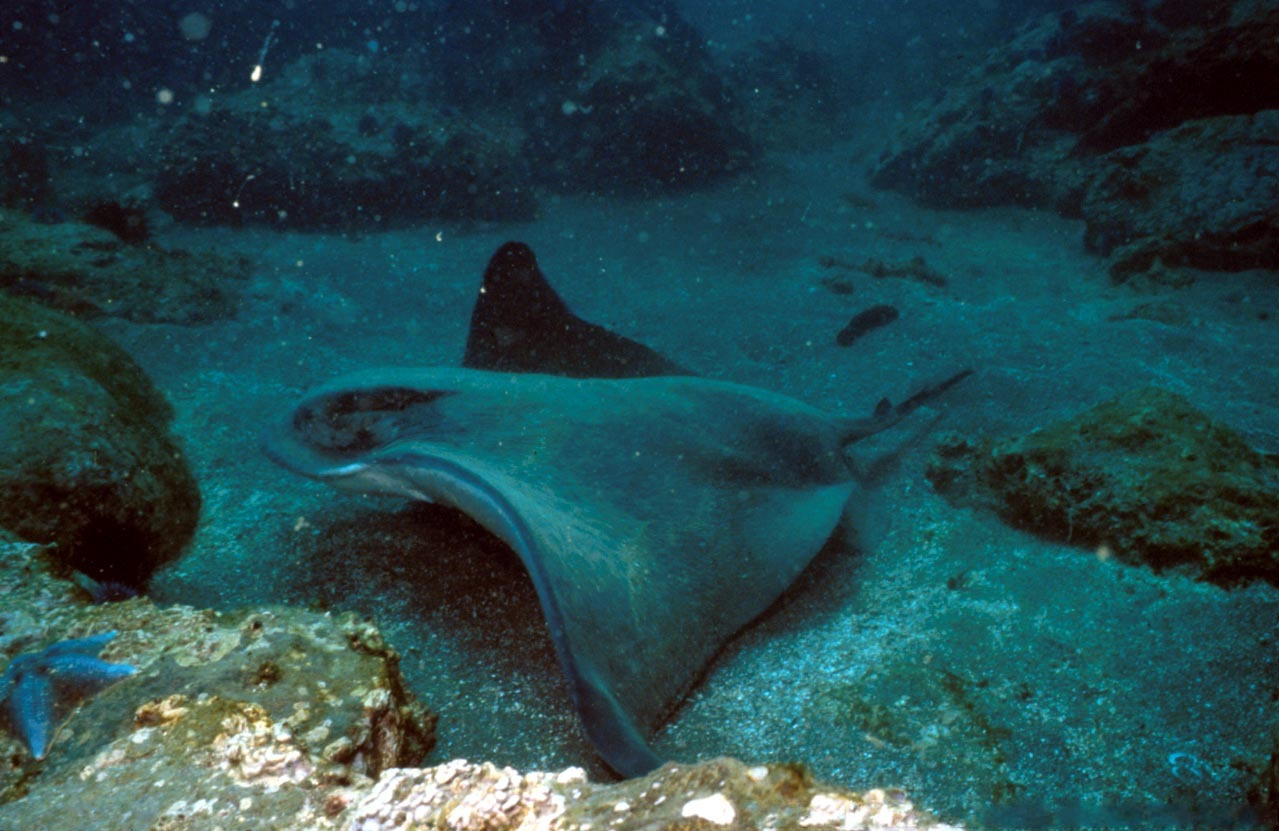
Bat ray

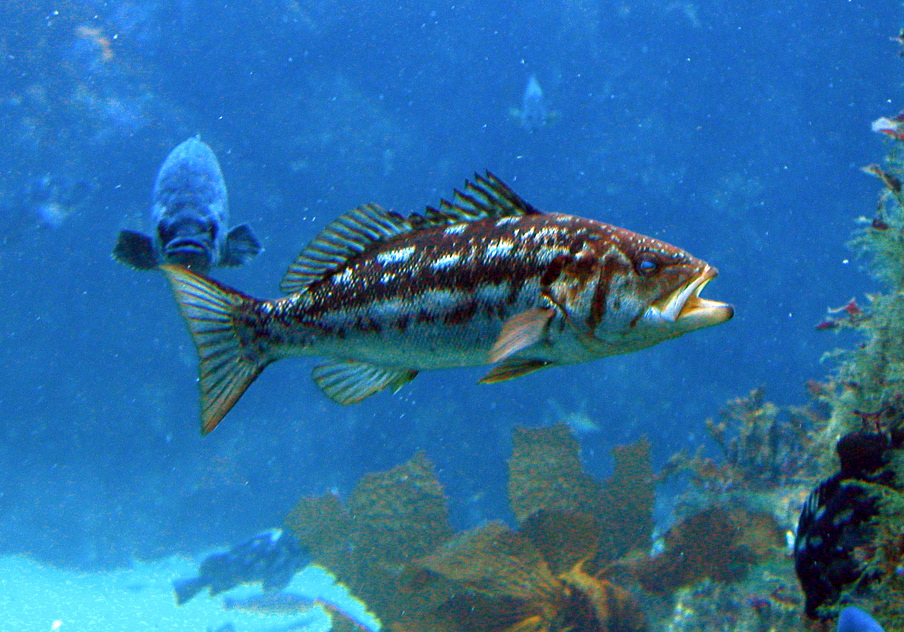
Kelp bass

== See also ==
- Cat Harbor State Marine Conservation Area
