= San Dieguito Lagoon State Marine Conservation Area =

Marine protected area on California's coast

Coordinates: 32.9663°N 117.2527°W

San Dieguito Lagoon State Marine Conservation Area (SMCA) is a marine protected area near Del Mar in San Diego County on California’s south coast.

The SMCA covers a small area of coastal and inland lagoon habitat. It protects marine life by limiting the removal of marine wildlife from within its borders. It prohibits take of all living marine resources except recreational take of finfish by hook-and-line from shore and the Grand Avenue bridge. Boating, swimming, wading, and diving are prohibited within the conservation area.

== History ==
San Dieguito Lagoon SMCA is one of 36 new marine protected areas adopted by the California Fish and Game Commission in December, 2010 during the third phase of the Marine Life Protection Act Initiative. The MLPAI is a collaborative public process to create a statewide network of protected areas along California's coastline.

The south coast's new marine protected areas were designed by local divers, fishermen, conservationists and scientists who comprised the South Coast Regional Stakeholder Group. Their job was to design a network of protected areas that would preserve sensitive sea life and habitats while enhancing recreation, study and education opportunities.

The south coast marine protected areas went into effect in 2012.

== Geography and natural features ==
San Dieguito Lagoon SMCA is located near Del Mar, California.

This area consists of waters below the mean high tide line within the San Dieguito Lagoon Ecological Reserve.

== Habitat and wildlife ==
This area protects estuarine/lagoon habitat and associated species.

== Scientific monitoring ==
As specified by the Marine Life Protection Act, select marine protected areas along California's south coast are being monitored by scientists to track their effectiveness and learn more about ocean health. Similar studies in marine protected areas located off of the Santa Barbara Channel Islands have already detected gradual improvements in fish size and number.
