= Bolsa Chica Basin State Marine Conservation Area =

Two adjoining marine protected areas

Bolsa Chica Basin State Marine Conservation Area (SMCA) and Bolsa Bay State Marine Conservation Area (SMCA) are two adjoining marine protected areas located in Orange County on the southern coast of California, United States. The SMCAs cover 0.66 and 0.07 square miles, respectively. The SMCAs protect marine life by limiting the removal of marine wildlife from within their borders.

== Activities ==
Bolsa Chica Basin SMCA prohibits take of all living marine resources except for take pursuant to routine operation and maintenance, habitat restoration, maintenance dredging, research and education, and maintenance of artificial structures inside the conservation area per any required federal, state and local permits, or activities pursuant to Section 630, or as otherwise authorized by the department.

Boating, swimming, wading, and diving are prohibited within the conservation area.

No person, except state and local law enforcement officers, fire suppression agencies and employees of the department in the performance of their official duties or persons possessing written permission from the department or employees of Signal Corporation and its invitees for the purpose of carrying out oil and gas operations, shall enter this conservation area and remain therein except on established trails, paths, or other designated areas.

No person shall enter this conservation area between the hours of 8:00 p.m. and 6:00 a.m.

Bolsa Bay SMCA prohibits take of all living marine resources is prohibited except the recreational take of finfish by hook-and-line from shore in designated areas only, or take pursuant to routine operation and maintenance, habitat restoration, maintenance dredging, research and education, and maintenance of artificial structures inside the conservation area per any required federal, state and local permits, or activities pursuant to Section 630, or as otherwise authorized by the department.

Boating, swimming, wading, and diving are prohibited within the conservation area.

No person, except state and local law enforcement officers, fire suppression agencies and employees of the department in the performance of their official duties or persons possessing written permission from the department or employees of Signal Corporation and its invitees for the purpose of carrying out oil and gas operations, shall enter this conservation area and remain therein except on established trails, paths, or other designated areas.

No person shall enter this conservation area between the hours of 8:00 p.m. and 6:00 a.m.

== History ==
Bolsa Bay SMCA and Bolsa Chica Basin SMCA are two of 36 new marine protected areas adopted by the California Fish and Game Commission in December, 2010 during the third phase of the Marine Life Protection Act Initiative. The MLPAI is a collaborative public process to create a statewide network of protected areas along California's coastline.

The south coast's new marine protected areas were designed by local divers, fishermen, conservationists and scientists who comprised the South Coast Regional Stakeholder Group. Their job was to design a network of protected areas that would preserve sensitive sea life and habitats while enhancing recreation, study and education opportunities.

The south coast marine protected areas went into effect in 2012. p

== Geography and natural features ==
Bolsa Bay SMCA and Bolsa Chica Basin are marine protected areas in Orange County.

Bolsa Bay SMCA: This area includes the waters below the mean high tide line within Bolsa Bay estuary southward of a line that approximates the Warner Avenue bridge located between the following two points:

1. 33°42.70′N 118°10.63′W
2. 33°42.70′N 118°03.61′W
3. 33°42.22′N 118°03.17′W
4. 33°42.19′N 118°03.18′W

Bolsa Chica Basin SMCA: This area includes the waters below the mean high tide line within the Bolsa Chica Basin estuary northeastward of the Pacific Coast Highway Bridge, approximated by a straight line between the following two points:

1. 33°41.02′N 118°02.15′W
2. 33°40.98′N 118°02.11′W
3. 33°42.22′N 118°03.17′W
4. 33°42.19′N 118°03.18′W

== Habitat and wildlife ==
These areas protect rich estuarine and upland lagoon habitat and associated species.

== Scientific monitoring ==
As specified by the Marine Life Protection Act, select marine protected areas along California's south coast are being monitored by scientists to track their effectiveness and learn more about ocean health. Similar studies in marine protected areas located off of the Santa Barbara Channel Islands have already detected gradual improvements in fish size and number.

== See also ==
- Bolsa Chica Ecological Reserve
- Bolsa Chica State Beach
- List of marine protected areas of California
