= Del Mar Landing State Marine Reserve =

Marine protected area in California

Del Mar Landing State Marine Reserve (SMR) is a marine protected area that lies onshore, about 2 miles (3 km) south of the town of Gualala and 3.5 miles north of Sea Ranch in Sonoma County on California’s north central coast. The marine protected area covers 0.22 square miles (0.57 km^{2}). Del Mar Landing SMR prohibits injuring, damaging, or taking all living, geological, and cultural marine resources.

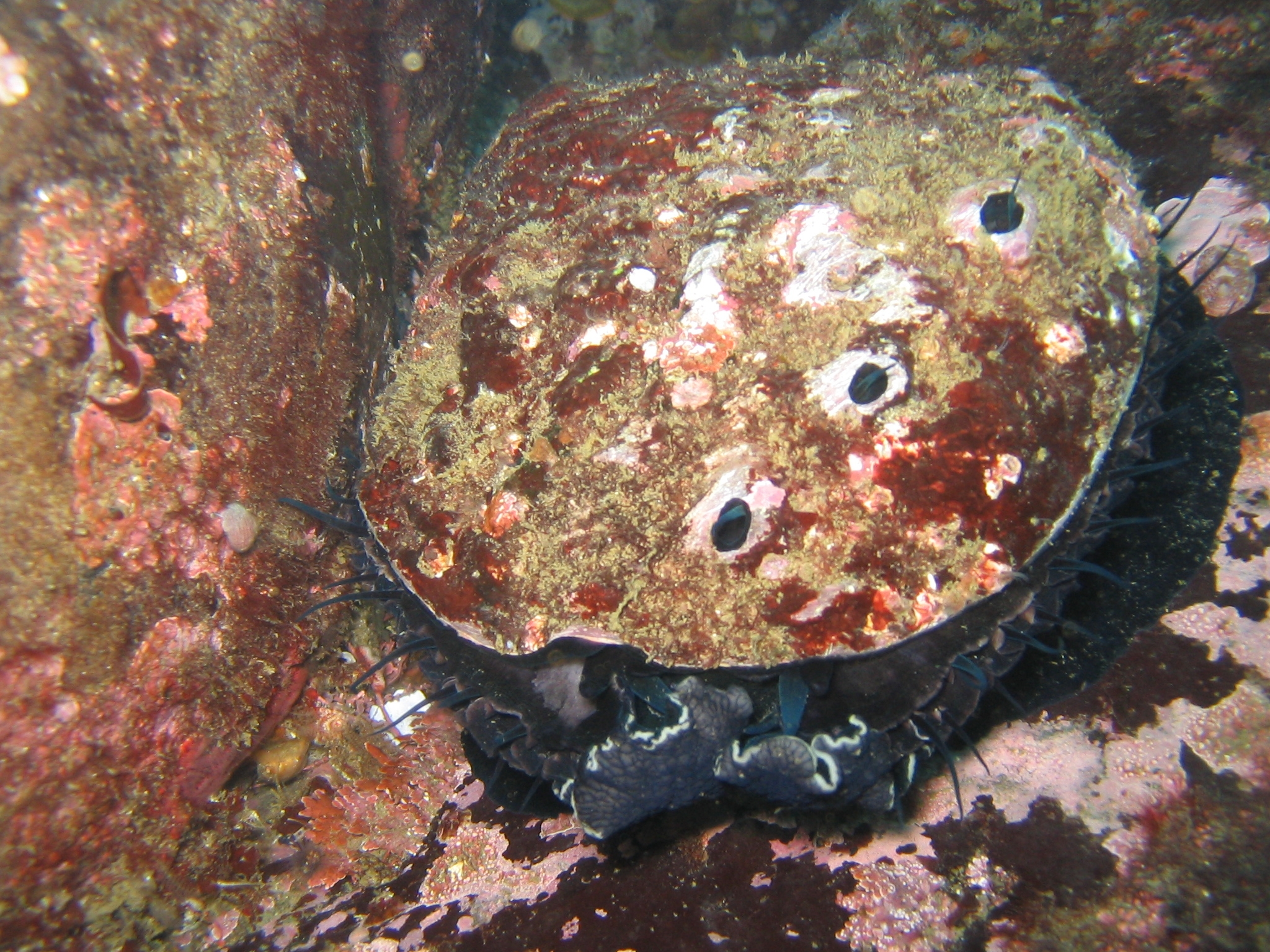
Abalone marine snail camouflaged with its environment at Del Mar Landing State Marine Reserve

== History ==
Del Mar Landing SMR is one of 22 marine protected areas adopted by the California Department of Fish and Game in August 2009, during the second phase of the Marine Life Protection Act Initiative. The MLPA Initiative is a collaborative public process to create a statewide network of protected areas along California’s coastline.

The north central coast’s marine protected areas were designed by local divers, fishermen, conservationists, and scientists who comprised the North Central Coast Regional Stakeholder Group. Their job was to design a network of protected areas that would preserve sensitive sea life and habitats while enhancing recreation, study, and education opportunities.

The north central coast marine protected areas came into effect on May 1, 2010.

== Geography and natural features ==
The Del Mar Landing SMR modifies the pre-existing Del Mar Ecological Reserve, an MPA valued by local communities. The SMR is located about 2 miles (3 km) south of the town of Gualala and 3.5 miles north of Sea Ranch in Sonoma County on California’s north central coast. The SMR is 0.7 miles wide east to west. The shoreline boundary of Del Mar Landing SMR is the mean high tide line and the protected area extends approximately half a mile south (to 38° 44.200 ′ N. latitude).

Del Mar Landing SMR consists of a rocky Intertidal zone, nearshore reefs, and offshore waters including seagrass beds and felp forests. The SMR is designed to protect nearshore fish and invertebrates, particularly abalone, and their habitat.

== Recreation ==
Collecting living marine resources is prohibited due to the Marine Life Protection Act. Activities such as kayaking, diving, snorkeling, and swimming are allowed unless otherwise restricted. Visitors to the area can camp at Gualala River Redwood Park, Gualala Point Regional Park, and Anchor Bay Campground.

== Scientific monitoring ==
As specified by the Marine Life Protection Act, select marine protected areas along California’s central coast are being monitored by scientists to track their effectiveness and learn more about ocean health. Similar studies in marine protected areas located off of the Santa Barbara Channel Islands have detected improvements in fish size and number.
