= Ten Mile State Marine Protected Areas =

Conservation areas in California

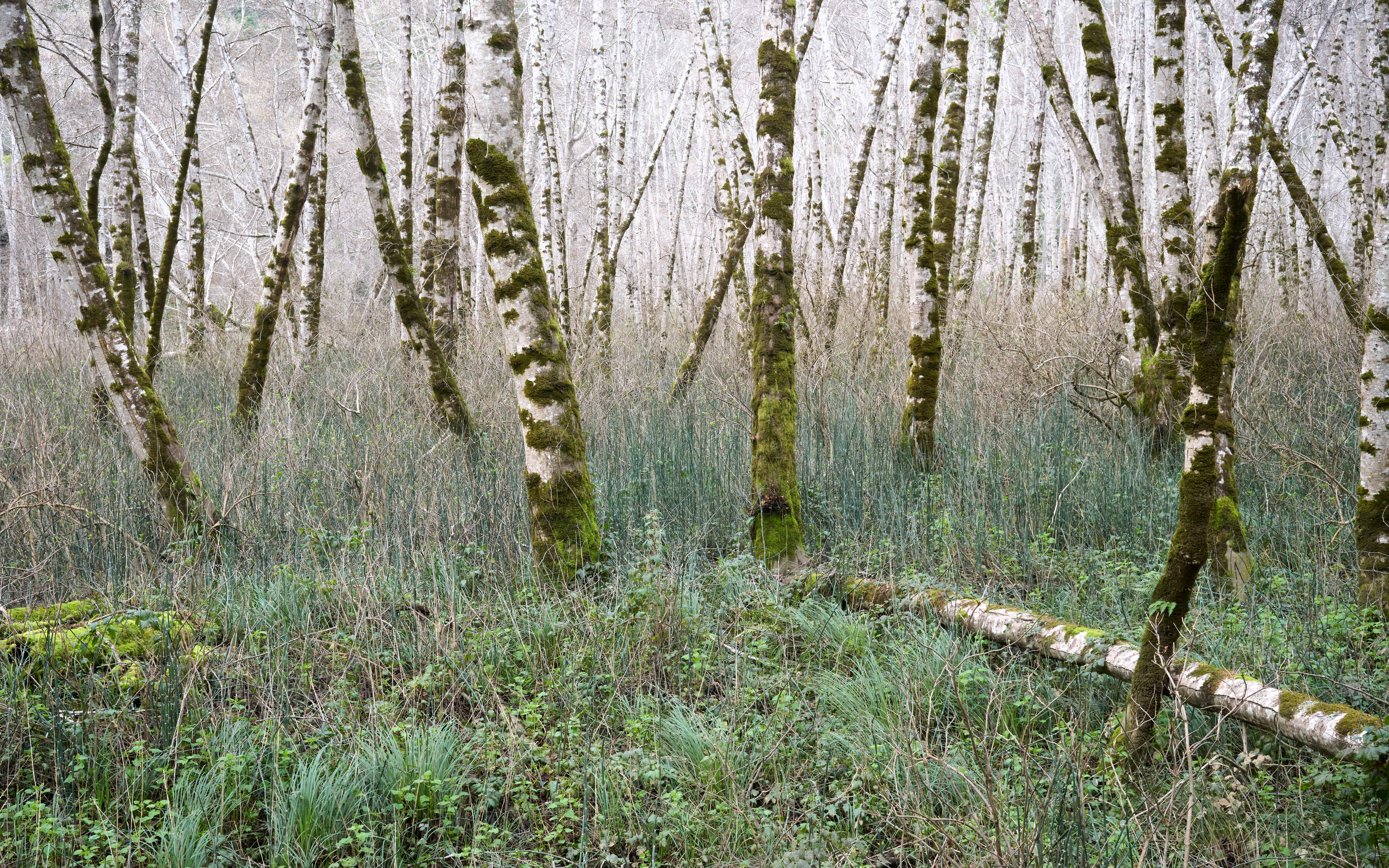
Birch trees in the Ten Mile Estuary State Marine Conservation Area south of Newport, Mendocino County

The Ten Mile State Marine Reserve, Ten Mile Beach State Marine Conservation Area and Ten Mile Estuary State Marine Conservation Area are located between Westport and Fort Bragg along the California coast north of San Francisco.

The Ten Mile State Marine Reserve encompasses 12 square miles, while the Marine Conservation Area totals 3.5 square miles. The Ten Mile Estuary State Marine Conservation Area covers .2 square miles.

== Restrictions ==
Ten Mile State Marine Reserve The take of all living marine resources is prohibited in the Ten Mile State Marine Reserve. Ten Mile Beach State Marine Conservation Area The take of all living marine resources in the area is prohibited. However, the recreational take of Dungeness crab by trap, hoop net or hand is allowed. The commercial take of Dungeness crab by trap is allowed. In addition, several federally recognized tribes are exempt from the area and take regulations for the area.

Ten Mile Estuary State Marine Conservation Area Take of all living marine resources in the Ten Mile Estuary State Marine Conservation Area except by federally recognized tribes. Waterfowl may be taken in accordance with general water fowl regulations. In addition, the “operation and maintenance of artificial structures inside the conservation area is allowed pursuant to any required federal, state and local permits, or as otherwise authorized by the department,” according to the California Department of Game and Fish.

== History ==
In June 2012, the California Fish and Game Commission voted unanimously to designate waters in the Ten Mile area, along with critical ocean habits in northern California, as Marine Protected Areas. The vote marked the completion of the United States’ first state network of underwater parks, protecting California coastal areas and important wildlife and habitats, which help the state's tourism industry, hotels and restaurant that depend on healthy fish populations and beautiful coasts to attract guests. According to the National Ocean Economics Program, California's coast and ocean generate $22 billion in revenue and sustain 350,000 jobs each year. The Ten Mile State marine areas took effect on December 19, 2012.

== Geography ==
This area is bounded by the mean high tide line and straight lines connecting the following points in the order listed except where noted:

Ten Mile State Marine Reserve: 39° 35.900' N. lat. 123° 47.243' W. long.; 39° 35.900' N. lat. 123° 51.479' W. long.; thence southward along the three nautical mile offshore boundary to 39° 33.300' N. lat. 123° 50.559' W. long.; and 39° 33.300' N. lat. 123° 46.015' W. long.

Ten Mile Beach State Marine Conservation Area: 39° 33.300' N. lat. 123° 46.015' W. long.; 39° 33.300' N. lat. 123° 50.559' W. long.; thence southward along the three nautical mile offshore boundary to 39° 32.500' N. lat. 123° 50.418' W. long.; 39° 32.500' N. lat. 123° 46.227' W. long.; thence northward along the mean high tide line onshore boundary to 39° 33.098' N. lat. 123° 46.003' W. long.; 39° 33.199' N. lat. 123° 45.966' W. long.

Ten Mile Estuary State Marine Conservation Area: 39° 33.199' N. lat. 123° 45.966' W. long.; and 39° 33.098' N. lat. 123° 46.003' W. long.

And westward of a line connecting the following two points:

39° 32.400' N. lat. 123° 44.785' W. long.; and 39° 32.382' N. lat. 123° 44.769' W. long.

== Habitat and wildlife ==
The Ten Mile State Marine Reserve Area protects key wildlife communities that reside in inland estuaries, while also providing key resting and breeding grounds areas for Pacific harbor seals. The area also protects shoreline beaches, offshore islets, surf grass and kelp beds. The Ten Mile Beach State Conservation Area connects the offshore Ten Mile State Marine Reserve Area to the inland Ten Mile Estuary State Marine Conservation Area.

The latter protects fish and bird communities and is designed to safeguard spawning and nursery grounds of species that are found offshore, according to the California Department of Game and Fish. This important area also protects shorebird and waterfowl habitats, along with feeding grounds for mammals such as seals and sea lions. The Ten Mile Estuary State Marine Conservation Area also is a transpiration corridor for river otters.

== Recreation and nearby attractions ==
The Ten Mile coastal area in northern California is also home to MacKerricher State Park, which draws visitors down to the shore to view birds and whales, ride kayaks, and picnic.
