= Kashtayit State Marine Conservation Area =

Marine protected area in Santa Barbara County, California

Kashtayit State Marine Conservation Area (SMCA) is a marine protected area that extends offshore in the Gaviota Coast in Santa Barbara County, California. The marine protected area covers 1.99 square miles (5.2 km^{2}). The marine protected areas protect natural habitats and marine life by protecting or limiting removal of wildlife from within their boundaries. Kashtayit SMCA prohibits take of living marine resources except: recreational take of finfish, invertebrates except rock scallops and mussels, and giant kelp (Macrocystis pyrifera) by hand harvest is allowed.

Take pursuant to maintenance of artificial structures and operation and maintenance of existing facilities is allowed inside the conservation area pursuant to any required federal, state and local permits, or as otherwise authorized by the department.

== History ==
Kashtayit State Marine Conservation Area (SMCA) is one of 36 new marine protected areas adopted by the California Fish and Game Commission in December, 2010 during the third phase of the Marine Life Protection Act Initiative. The MLPAI is a collaborative public process to create a statewide network of protected areas along California's coastline.

The south coast's new marine protected areas were designed by local divers, fishermen, conservationists and scientists who comprised the South Coast Regional Stakeholder Group. Their job was to design a network of protected areas that would preserve sensitive sea life and habitats while enhancing recreation, study and education opportunities.

The south coast marine protected areas went into effect in 2012.

== Geography ==
Kashtayit State Marine Conservation Area (SMCA) is a marine protected area that extends offshore from the Gaviota Coast area of Santa Barbara County on California's south coast.

This area is bounded by the mean high tide line and straight lines connecting the following points in the order listed:

1. 34°28.13′N 120°14.46′W
2. 34°27.30′N 120°14.46′W
3. 34°27.30′N 120°12.47′W and
4. 34°28.23′N 120°22.47′W.

== Habitat and wildlife ==
This is intended as a heritage site with significant educational opportunities. Kashtayit SMCA is contiguous to an existing State Park, Gaviota State Park, the traditional Chumash village site of Kashtayit. As a Traditional Cultural Place that plays a significant role in Chumash maritime culture, it is ideally suited for tribal co-management to promote 1) education and outreach, 2) marine stewardship, and Chumash maritime cultural preservation and revitalization.

== Scientific monitoring ==
As specified by the Marine Life Protection Act, select marine protected areas along California's south coast are being monitored by scientists to track their effectiveness and learn more about ocean health. Similar studies in marine protected areas located off the Santa Barbara Channel Islands have already detected gradual improvements in fish size and number.
