= Big Creek State Marine Reserve and Marine Conservation Area =

Marine protected areas that lie offshore of Big Sur on California's central coast

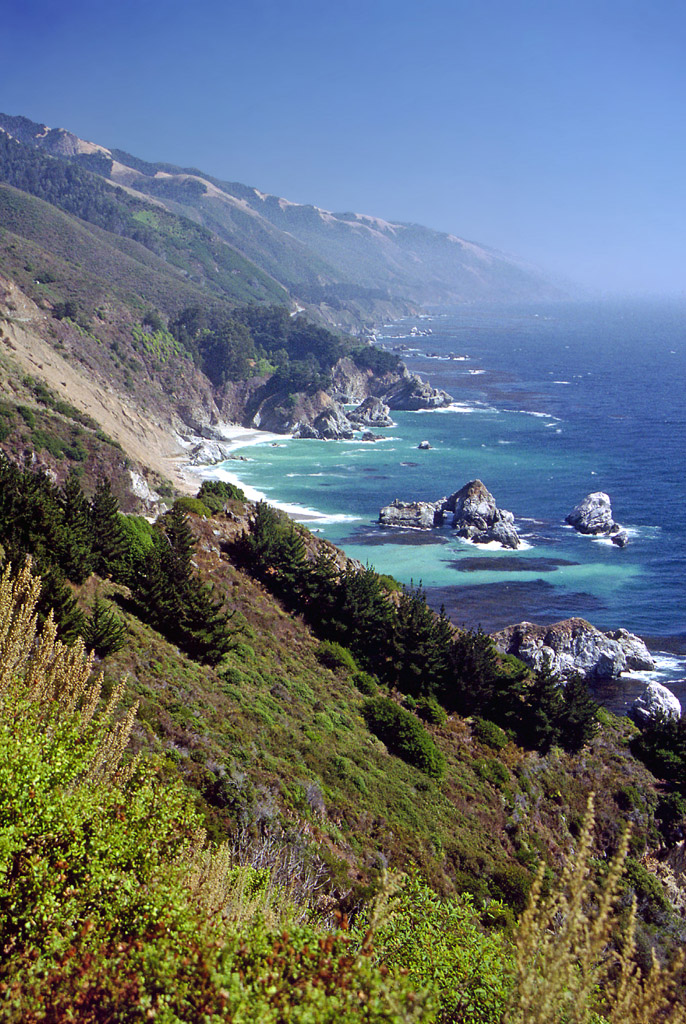
- Big Sur

- Location within California Location within the United States
- Location: Big Sur, California, United States
- Nearest city: Big Sur, California
- Coordinates: 36°07′20″N 121°38′0″W
- Established: 1994
- Governing body: California Department of Parks and Recreation

Big Creek State Marine Reserve (SMR) and Big Creek State Marine Conservation Area (SMCA) are two adjoining marine protected areas that lie offshore of Big Sur on California's central coast. The combined area of these marine protected areas is 22.45 square miles (58.1 km^{2}). The SMR protects all marine life within its boundaries. Fishing and take of all living marine resources is prohibited. Within the SMCA fishing and take of all living marine resources is prohibited except the commercial and recreational take of salmon, albacore, and the commercial take of spot prawn.

== History ==
Big Creek SMR was established in 1994 and Big Creek SMCA was established in September 2007 by the California Fish & Game Commission. It was one of 29 marine protected areas adopted during the first phase of the Marine Life Protection Act Initiative. The Marine Life Protection Act Initiative (or MLPAI) is a collaborative public process to create a statewide network of marine protected areas along the California coastline.

== Geography and natural features ==
These two marine protected areas adjoin each other off the coast of Big Sur. In the waters off the Big Sur/Big Creek coast are a series of narrow and steep finger canyons that serrate the continental shelf. The sites are adjacent to Julia Pfeiffer Burns State Park.

== Habitat and wildlife ==
The underwater canyons of the Big Creek marine protected areas provide habitat to a variety of deepwater rockfishes such as cabezon and bocaccio. The area is also an important forage area for southern sea otters.

== Recreation and nearby attractions ==
Adjacent Julia Pfeiffer Burns State Park provides hiking trails, including an overlook trail to McWay Falls, an 80-foot (24 m) waterfall that drops into the cove below.

California's marine protected areas encourage recreational and educational uses of the ocean. Activities such as kayaking, diving, snorkeling, and swimming are allowed unless otherwise restricted.

== Scientific monitoring ==
As specified by the Marine Life Protection Act, select marine protected areas along California's central coast are being monitored by scientists to track their effectiveness and learn more about ocean health. Similar studies in marine protected areas located off of the Santa Barbara Channel Islands have already detected gradual improvements in fish size and number.

Local scientific and educational institutions involved in the monitoring include Stanford University's Hopkins Marine Station, University of California Santa Cruz, Moss Landing Marine Laboratories and Cal Poly San Luis Obispo. Research methods include hook-and-line sampling, intertidal and scuba diver surveys, and the use of Remote Operated Vehicle (ROV) submarines.
