= Arrow Point to Lion Head Point State Marine Conservation Area =

Marine protected area in the United States

Arrow Point to Lion Head Point (SMCA) is a marine protected area on Catalina Island that includes offshore, island marine habitat off California’s south coast. The SMCA covers 0.67 square miles (1.7 km^{2}). In general an SMCA protects marine life by limiting the removal of marine wildlife from within their borders. In this SMCA all recreational take is allowed in accordance with current regulations, except the recreational take of invertebrates is prohibited .

== History ==
'Arrow Point to Lion Head Point SMCA is one of 36 new marine protected areas adopted by the California Fish and Game Commission in December 2010 during the third phase of the Marine Life Protection Act Initiative. This is a modified version of a previously existing MPA. The MLPAI is a collaborative public process to create a statewide network of protected areas along California’s coastline.

The south coast’s new marine protected areas were designed by local divers, fishermen, conservationists and scientists who comprised the South Coast Regional Stakeholder Group. Their job was to design a network of protected areas that would preserve sensitive sea life and habitats while enhancing recreation, study and education opportunities.

The south coast marine protected areas went into effect in 2012.

== Geography and natural features ==
This SMCA includes a narrow band of very near shore island marine habitat featuring rocky bottom, kelp forest and rocky, high energy shoreline.

This area is bounded by the mean high tide line to a distance of 1000 feet seaward of the mean lower low tide line of any shoreline southeastward of a line connecting the following two points:

1. 33°28.660′N 118°32.310′W
2. 33°28.820′N 118°32.310′W
3. 33°27.240′N 118°29.900′W
4. 33°27.170′N 118°30.100′W

== Habitat and wildlife ==
The rocky reef, kelp forest and emergent rock habitats in these MPAs support numerous species of invertebrates, plants, fish and marine mammals; among them are garibaldi, rockfish, octopus, gorgonians, nudibranchs, bat rays, kelp bass and many more. The sedentary, invertebrate species located there are set aside from recreational harvest.

== Recreation and nearby attractions ==
Catalina Island and its MPAs support world class diving along with numerous hiking, diving and snorkeling, kayaking, fishing and boating activities.

== Scientific monitoring ==
As specified by the Marine Life Protection Act, select marine protected areas along California’s south coast are being monitored by scientists to track their effectiveness and learn more about ocean health. Similar studies in marine protected areas located off of the Santa Barbara Channel Islands have already detected gradual improvements in fish size and number.
