= Upper Newport Bay State Marine Conservation Area =

Marine protected area in California

Upper Newport Bay State Marine Conservation Area (SMCA) is a marine protected area in Newport Bay in Orange County and the South Coast region of Southern California. It extends inland/northeast from the Pacific Coast Highway crossing of the bay, within the city of Newport Beach.

== History ==
SMCA is one of 36 new marine protected areas adopted by the California Fish and Game Commission in December, 2010 during the third phase of the Marine Life Protection Act Initiative. The MLPAI is a collaborative public process to create a statewide network of protected areas along California’s coastline.

The south coast’s new marine protected areas were designed by local divers, fishermen, conservationists and scientists who comprised the South Coast Regional Stakeholder Group. Their job was to design a network of protected areas that would preserve sensitive sea life and habitats while enhancing recreation, study and education opportunities.

The South Coast marine protected areas went into effect in 2012.

== Geography ==
The Upper Newport Bay SMCA covers 1.28 square miles of estuary and wetlands area.

The designated SMCA area includes the waters below the mean high tide line within Upper Newport Bay, northeastward of Pacific Coast Highway approximated by a line between the following points:

1. 33°37.02′N 117°54.24′W
2. 33°37.02′N 117°54.32′W
3. 33°39.07′N 117°52.02′W
4. 33°39.03′N 117°52.01′W

In waters below the mean high tide line inside the Upper Newport Bay Ecological Reserve, northeastward of a line connecting Shellmaker Island.

1. 33°37.20′N 117°53.51′W and North Star Beach
2. 33°37.38′N 117°53.60′W.

== Habitat and wildlife ==
The Upper Newport Bay SMCA protects a rare upland lagoon ecosystem, and its associated animal and plant species.

The SMCA protects marine life by limiting the removal of marine wildlife from within its borders. Upper Newport Bay SMCA prohibits take of all living marine resources except the recreational take of finfish by hook-and-line from shore only, or take pursuant to maintenance dredging, habitat restoration, research and education programs, maintenance of artificial structures, and operation and maintenance of existing facilities inside the conservation area per any required federal, state and local permits, or activities pursuant to Section 630, or as otherwise authorized by the department.

=== Scientific monitoring ===
As specified by the Marine Life Protection Act, select marine protected areas along California’s south coast are being monitored by scientists to track their effectiveness and learn more about ocean health. Similar studies in marine protected areas located off of the Santa Barbara Channel Islands have already detected gradual improvements in fish size and number.

== Recreation and nearby attractions ==
Located in the city of Newport Beach, the Upper Newport Bay SMCA sits amongst some of southern California’s most visited coastal recreation amenities. Miles of sandy beaches, coves and points, and blufftop hiking trails are available for beachcombing, wading, surfing, snorkeling and kayaking.

Throughout this area, collecting living marine resources from the intertidal area is prohibited to preserve wildlife, while some fishing opportunities are available offshore along the Crystal Cove and Dana Point coastline outside the Laguna Beach SMR.

The following restrictions apply:

- Swimming is allowed only in the area between North Star Beach and mid-channel.
- Boats are limited to speeds less than five miles per hour.
- Shoreline access is limited to established trails, paths, or other designated areas.

== See also ==
- Crystal Cove State Park
- Laguna Beach State Marine Reserve
