= Tijuana River Mouth State Marine Conservation Area =

Marine protected area on California's coast

Tijuana River Mouth State Marine Conservation Area is a marine protected area that extends offshore of southern San Diego County on California's south coast. The state marine conservation area (SMCA) covers 2.91 square miles (7.5 km^{2}).

The SMCA protects marine life by limiting the removal of marine wildlife from within its borders. Swami's SMCA prohibits take of all living marine resources except: recreational take of coastal pelagic species, except market squid by hand-held dip net only, is allowed. Commercial take of coastal pelagic species, except market squid, by round haul net only is allowed. Take pursuant to beach nourishment and other sediment management activities and operation and maintenance of artificial structures inside the conservation area is allowed per any required federal, state and local permits, or as otherwise authorized by the department.

Please see the following for official details on boundaries, regulations and other information:

== History ==
Tijuana River Mouth SMCA is one of 36 new marine protected areas adopted by the California Fish and Game Commission in December 2010 during the third phase of the Marine Life Protection Act Initiative. The MLPAI is a collaborative public process to create a statewide network of protected areas along California's coastline.

The south coast's new marine protected areas were designed by local divers, fishermen, conservationists and scientists who comprised the South Coast Regional Stakeholder Group. Their job was to design a network of protected areas that would preserve sensitive sea life and habitats while enhancing recreation, study and education opportunities.

The south coast marine protected went into effect 2012.

== Geography and natural features ==
Tijuana River Mouth SMCA extends offshore of southern San Diego County along the Imperial Beach area, including US waters along the US–Mexico Border. This area is bounded by the mean high tide line and straight lines connecting the following points in the order listed except where noted:

1. 32°34.00′N 117°07.98′W
2. 32°34.00′N 117°09.00′W thence southeastward along the three nautical mile offshore boundary to
3. 32°31.97′N 117°09.00′W and
4. 32°32.06′N 117°07.48′W.

== Habitat and wildlife ==
This MPA is geographically connected with Tijuana River Estuary, a National Estuarine Research Reserve site, *Tijuana Slough National Wildlife Refuge creating the most intact contiguous estuarine/marine complex in the Southern California bioregion. The MPA includes a river mouth delta, soft sea floor sediment, the largest south coast region of offshore cobble reef at 3 by 3 km, a major barred sand bass spawning area, a persistent kelp bed, surfgrass, and a freshwater plume.
