= South La Jolla State Marine Conservation Area =

Marine protected area in California

South La Jolla State Marine Conservation Area (SMCA) and South La Jolla State Marine Reserve (SMR) are two adjoining marine protected areas that extend offshore in San Diego County on California's south coast. The two marine protected areas cover 7.51 square miles (19.5 km^{2}). The SMR protects marine life by prohibiting the removal of marine wildlife from within its borders, while the SMCA limits removal of marine wildlife.

== History ==
South La Jolla SMCA and SMR are two of 36 new marine protected areas adopted by the California Fish and Game Commission in December, 2010 during the third phase of the Marine Life Protection Act Initiative. The MLPAI is a collaborative public process to create a statewide network of protected areas along California's coastline.

The south coast's new marine protected areas were designed by local divers, fishermen, conservationists and scientists who comprised the South Coast Regional Stakeholder Group. Their job was to design a network of protected areas that would preserve sensitive sea life and habitats while enhancing recreation, study and education opportunities.

The south coast marine protected areas went into effect in 2012.

== Geography and natural features ==
South La Jolla SMCA and SMR are two adjoining marine protected areas that extend offshore in San Diego County on California's south coast.

South La Jolla SMCA is bounded by straight lines connecting the following points in the order listed except where noted:

1. 32°49.573′N 117°19.000′W
2. 32°49.573′N 117°20.528′W thence southeastward along the three nautical mile offshore boundary to
3. 32°47.945′N 117°20.068′W and
4. 32°47.945′N 117°19.000′W.

South La Jolla State Marine Reserve is bounded by straight lines connecting the following points in the order listed except where noted:

1. 32°49.573′N 117°16.781′W
2. 32°49.573′N 117°19.000′W
3. 32°47.945′N 117°19.000′W
4. 32°47.945′N 117°15.495′W.

== Habitat and wildlife ==
South La Jolla SMCA and South La Jolla SMR provide protection for a portion of the most diverse and extensive representation of marine life and habitats along California's south coast. This biological hotspot includes dense kelp forest, rocky and sandy intertidal areas and rocky reefs. These habitats are home to an array of creatures including abalone, yellowtail, brown pelican, sea lions, and even the occasional migrating gray whale.

== Recreation and nearby attractions ==
South La Jolla is known as “the jewel” of San Diego. Sandstone formations flank a coastal ecosystem teeming with life. Many local species can also be observed at nearby Birch Aquarium, which is affiliated with the Scripps Institution of Oceanography and is open to the public

Visitors to South La Jolla enjoy shore-diving access, and join local residents in a range of activities including surfing, kayaking, scuba diving, snorkeling, tidepooling, and sunbathing. Windansea Beach is a surf break with powerful waves that challenge even the most experienced surfer.

Children's Pool (also known as Casa Beach), just to the north of Windansea Beach, has become a haul-out and breeding spot for harbor seals, where they can be seen year-round basking on the shore. There are many tidepools in this vicinity to explore.

Directly to the east, Mt. Soledad (at 823 feet (251 m), the highest coastal peak between Los Angeles and Mexico) is a top cycling destination, and provides a 360' panoramic view of San Diego.

South La Jolla SMCA protects marine life within its boundaries. The take of all living marine resources is prohibited except…South La Jolla SMR prohibits the take of all living marine resources. However, California's marine protected areas encourage recreational and educational uses of the ocean. Activities such as kayaking, diving, snorkeling, and swimming are allowed unless otherwise restricted.

== Scientific monitoring ==
As specified by the Marine Life Protection Act, select marine protected areas along California's south coast are being monitored by scientists to track their effectiveness and learn more about ocean health.
