= Sharp Manufacturing Company of America =

- Built: 1979
- Operated: 1979–present
- Location: 4050 South Mendenhall Road; Memphis, Tennessee, United States
- Coordinates: 35°2′16″N 89°52′56″W
- Industry: Home appliances
- Products: microwave drawers
- Area: 104 acres (42 ha)
- Volume: 650,000 square feet (60,000 m^{2})
- Owner: Sharp Corporation

Sharp Manufacturing Company of America (SMCA) is a manufacturing plant in Memphis, Tennessee, owned by Sharp Corporation.

== History ==
The plant was established in 1979 to produce color televisions and microwave ovens. The Memphis plant made 77,000 color televisions and 18,000 microwaves in its first year of production.

In the late 1980s, the plant began exporting microwave ovens to Europe. Also, it later began producing personal computers; the plant assembles about 1 million color televisions and 900,000 microwave ovens annually as of 1989.

In December 1997, Sharp opened a new television manufacturing plant in Rosarito Beach, Baja California, Mexico (SEMEX) to shift smaller-screen TV (13-, 19-, and 20-inch) production from Memphis, Tennessee. The shift of television production from Memphis to Rosario Beach was completed in January 2001 (for most direct-view TVs) and November 2002 (for other TV models).

On October 17, 2003, the SMCA plant began producing solar panels as its first manufacturing facility outside of Japan. The plant initially launched with a 20-megawatt annual capacity, assembling residential and commercial modules. The company stopped producing them at plant in March 2014 to focus on its domestic Japanese market, eliminating 300 jobs.

In March 2005, the factory officially began production of the revolutionary built-in microwave drawer, which transformed modern kitchen design by placing the appliance below counters or in islands.

On February 25, 2020, Sharp celebrated the 1 millionth microwave drawer at its plant.
