= Cat Harbor State Marine Conservation Area =

Marine protected area off the coast of California

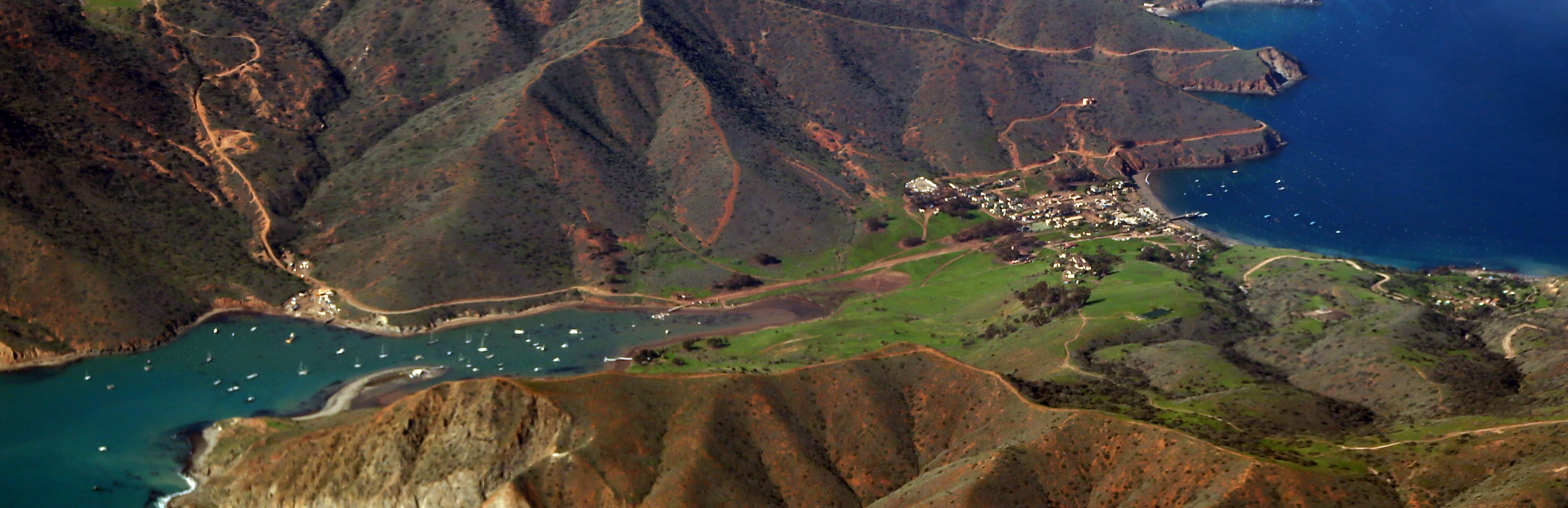
Two Harbors Isthmus in Santa Catalina Island; on the right, or northeast, is Isthmus Cove (aka Banning Harbor) and on the left, or southwest, is Catalina (or Cat) Harbor.

Cat Harbor State Marine Conservation Area (SMCA) is a marine protected area that includes offshore, island marine habitat at Catalina Island off California's south coast. The SMCA covers 0.24 square miles (0.62 km^{2}). The SMCA protects marine life by limiting the removal of marine wildlife from within their borders. Cat Harbor SMCA prohibits take of all living marine resources except: recreational take of finfish by hook-and-line or by spearfishing, squid by hook-and-line, and lobster and sea urchin is allowed; commercial take of sea cucumbers by diving only, and spiny lobster and sea urchin is allowed. Aquaculture of finfish pursuant to any required state permits is allowed.

== Activities ==
Take pursuant to maintenance of artificial structures inside the conservation area is allowed pursuant to any required federal, state and local permits, or as otherwise authorized by the department.

== History ==
Cat Harbor SMCA is one of 36 new marine protected areas adopted by the California Fish and Game Commission in December 2010 during the third phase of the Marine Life Protection Act Initiative. The MLPAI is a collaborative public process to create a statewide network of protected areas along California’s coastline.

The south coast’s new marine protected areas were designed by local divers, fishermen, conservationists and scientists who comprised the South Coast Regional Stakeholder Group. Their job was to design a network of protected areas that would preserve sensitive sea life and habitats while enhancing recreation, study and education opportunities.

The south coast marine protected areas went into effect in 2012.

== Geography and natural features ==
Cat Harbor SMCA protects habitat within Cat Harbor on Santa Catalina Island, California. This area contains eelgrass habitat, and affords recreational opportunities

This area includes the waters below the mean high tide line on the west side of Catalina Island northward of a straight line connecting Pin Rock:

33°25.50′N 118°30.28′W and Cat Head Point 33°25.32′N 118°30.76′W.

== Habitat and wildlife ==
This area contains eelgrass habitat, and affords recreational opportunities.

== Scientific monitoring ==
As specified by the Marine Life Protection Act, select marine protected areas along California’s south coast are being monitored by scientists to track their effectiveness and learn more about ocean health. Similar studies in marine protected areas located off of the Santa Barbara Channel Islands have already detected gradual improvements in fish size and number.
