= Marine Life Protection Act =

California environmental law

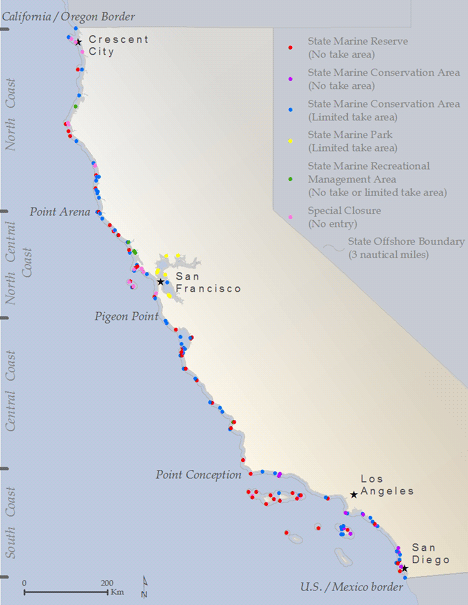
Californias Marine Protected Areas

The Marine Life Protection Act (MLPA) was passed in 1999 and is part of the California Fish and Game Code. The MLPA requires California to reevaluate all existing marine protected areas (MPAs) and potentially design new MPAs that together form a statewide network. The MLPA has clear guidance associated with the development of this MPA network. MPAs are developed on a regional basis with MLPA and MPA-specific goals in mind and are evaluated over time to assess their effectiveness in meeting these goals. The five main goals of the Marine Life Protection Act are to maintain the diversity of marine ecosystems, conserve its populations, better educate people on human-marine life interactions, protect habitats, and effectively enforce MPAs. The establishment of this policy is an important step in expanding science-based management and decision making regarding policies.

== Overview ==
Unlike terrestrial conservation, marine conservation often lacks a systematic approach to conserving biodiversity. Little gap analysis has been performed on the marine environment, and there is a lack of knowledge into what is protected, what needs to be protected, and where the protection needs to occur. Over the last century there has been a rapid increase in the loss of marine biodiversity and habitat degradation. About 70%-80% of California's population lives within one hour of the coast and the ocean provides resources to local, state, and national interests. As a result, species and habitat loss have become a major issue. Over 90% of California's coastal wetlands have been lost, coastal waters have become contaminated with a variety of urban and agricultural toxins, and a large number of targeted species have declined in the last 10–20 years. Over the last twenty years California fish catches have decreased by over 50%. These impacts have decreased the health and value of California's coastal ocean and imply a need for a more systematic approach to marine conservation. Although there is no single solution to conserving the marine environment, MPAs are a potentially valuable tool for marine conservation when designed and managed effectively. A well-designed and managed network of MPAs helps to prevent degradation, fosters marine biodiversity, and may maintain a more sustainable fishing industry. The MLPA helps to promote a shift from single-species management to an ecosystem-based management and is a systematic approach to marine conservation.

== History ==
California's first six MPAs were created between 1909 and 1913; by 1950 all had been removed. After 1950 more than 50 other MPAs were created along the California coast. But these MPAs were established in a random manner and without regard to regional conservation goals. Most have been thought to be too small and ineffective in protecting against habitat and species loss. With these existing MPAs less than 1% of coastal waters were protected, and none extended to deeper waters. In 1999 the MLPA was created in order to re-evaluate the current MPA system and to establish a better network of MPAs that would be more effective in protecting against habitat and species loss.

Before the enforcement of the Marine Life Protection Act, very few of California's coastal areas were protected within MPAs. There needed to be a system established that would improve the protection of California marine systems and help regulate building in marine areas and researchers' plans to alter any of these areas. Although the original plans for MPAs did attempt to follow the guidelines of science and practicality at first, they were not satisfactory for stakeholders who managed the area. Eventually, the plan that was approved increased the number of habitats that were protected by MPAs. The establishment of these created benefits for fisheries management too, though this was not the main focus of the plan. Creating these MPAs increased the abundance, size, and diversity of fish, invertebrates, and algae. The success of this plan inspired the creation of similar policies around the world. The Marine Life Protection Act caused science to play a larger role in California environmental planning than ever before.

=== MLPA Findings ===
The MLPA found that existing MPAs were not created under a coherent plan or scientific guidelines and that there is a need to redesign the MPA system. Coastal development, water pollution, and other human activities are a threat to California's diverse coastal waters. These coastal waters, along with the ecosystems and species which thrive within them, are vital assets to the state and nation. An improved MPA system would help protect against habitat and ecosystem loss, conserve biological diversity, provide safe breeding grounds for fish and other marine species, improve research opportunities, create a reference point from which the rest of the ocean can be compared against, and may help to re-grow depleted fisheries.

=== MPA Network ===
The MLPA appointed the California Department of Fish and Wildlife (CDFW) with the task of developing and managing a network of MPAs. The CDFG determines the final location and size of each MPA. The goal is to establish a network of MPAs that work together. This network takes into account the movement of adult and larval fish and also focuses on deepwater habitats for the first time. A proportion of the MPA network is to be designated as no-take zones. No-take zones allow for a large area of safe breeding grounds and a sanctuary for large, female fish. Large female fish produce more viable offspring and are vital in a population. With this idea, the MPA network has the potential to boost fish populations in areas outside of MPAs. Fishery growth has been successful along the Great Barrier Reef Marine Park and the Florida Keys National Marine Sanctuary after reserves were established in these areas. The final decision of the size and location of the MPAs depends on the species and habitats affected, stakeholder and conservation goals, and how each individual MPA will function on its own and as part of the network.

Prior to the Marine Life Protection Act, insufficiently sized MPAs in California waters contributed to a lack of efficacy in protection. Under the Marine Life Protection Act, the implementation of 124 new MPAs resulted in an increase of 13% MPA coverage in state waters for a total of 67% in protected areas. Nearly 9.5% designated no-take areas within this network of MPAs were introduced in 2012.

=== MLPA Implementation ===
After its passage in 1999, the CDFG began to implement the MLPA. The first attempt involved a Master Plan Team which included primarily scientific experts and governmental agencies, with little input from local stakeholders. This plan failed once it was brought to the public for approval, mostly because stakeholders and other members of the public were excluded from the process. Commercial and recreational fishers showed the most resistance, stating that MPAs produce no benefits for fisheries and objecting to the size and location of the proposed MPAs. In 2002, the CDFG implemented the MLPA for a second time. This plan involved members from the Master Plan Team, as well as seven Working Stakeholder Groups, which included governmental agency officials, recreational and commercial fishing interests, recreational divers, ocean vessel representatives, environmental interests, charter boat operators, harbormasters, and scientists/educators. This attempt was more successful and gained public support, but the project lost funding in 2003 due to a poor fiscal year.

In 2004, the CDFG gained new funding from several organizations to initiate the Marine Life Protection Act Initiative. The Initiative divided the coast into sequential regions and assembled a Blue Ribbon Task Force on Marine Protected Areas, Science Advisory Team, and Regional Stakeholder Group to develop and evaluate the first set of MPAs in the Central Coast region. On April 13, 2007, after nearly three years of public meetings and proposal reviews, the Fish and Game Commission evaluated and voted on a final MPA proposal for the Central California coast. The commission voted on a plan to establish 29 MPAs covering approximately 204 square miles (18%) of state waters with 85 square miles (8%) designated as no-take state marine reserves. The network ranges from Pigeon Point in San Mateo County south to Point Conception in Santa Barbara County and contains multiple types of MPAs with varying degrees of protection.

The Central Coast plan has received high marks for scientific effectiveness. Local stakeholders developed a balanced network that protects the region's best habitat, including parts of the Big Sur Coast and Monterey Bay while allowing continued access to most recreational and commercial fishing grounds. California's Central Coast MPAs went into effect in September 2007 and scientific baseline data has been collected over the last two years.

The Central Coast was the first to be designated, first to be violated and first to be successfully prosecuted. The SMR in Morro Bay State Marine Recreational Management Area and Morro Bay State Marine Reserve is the recipient of two creeks that drain 75 square miles of the watershed, known as the Estero Bay Hydrologic Unit. One of these creeks (Chorro) hosts effluent from a habitual polluter upstream, the CMC (California Men's Colony State Prison). The SMR took effect in Sept 2007, and in Jan 2008, the CMC spilled sewage into Chorro Creek, which meandered into the State Marine Reserve portion of the Morro Bay Estuary. Working together, coastal activist Joey Racano, then-Gov Arnold Schwarzenegger and the Central Coast Regional Water Quality Control Board together successfully prosecuted the SMR violation by getting the ACL (Administrative Civil Liability) to reflect the violation was more than just another spill, but was a spill into an MPA (Marine Protected Area) into a no-take SMR. This set the precedent for all future violators, and for upstream violators (or violations from outside the SMR boundaries) as well as a precedent set for too much chlorine in the discharge. Due to the MPA violation, the CCRWQCB staff ordered the CMC to receive a higher fine than the original ACL had specified.

The North Central Coast plan, adopted by the Fish and Game Commission on August 5, 2009, also represented a compromise between different interest groups and protected iconic sites like the Farallon Islands, Point Reyes Headlands, and Bodega Head while leaving nearly 90 percent of coastal waters open for fishing. Regulations for the North Central Coast MPAs, which extend from Alder Creek, near Pt. Arena in Mendocino County, to Pigeon Point in San Mateo County, went into effect on May 1, 2010. The regulations established 21 marine protected areas (MPAs), three State Marine Recreational Management Areas, and six special closures, in total covering approximately 153 square miles (20.1%) of state waters in the north central coast study region. Approximately 86 square miles (11%) of the 153 square miles (400 km^{2}) are designated as "no take" state marine reserves, while different take allowances providing varying levels of protection are designated for the rest.

In 2008, South Coast Regional Stakeholders began a public planning process to design the part of the statewide MPA network that spans from Pt. Conception in Santa Barbara county to the U.S. border with Mexico. On Dec. 15, 2010, the CA Fish and Game Commission adopted regulations to create 36 new MPAs encompassing approximately 187 square miles (8 percent) of state waters in the study region. Approximately 116 square miles (4.9 percent) have been designated as no-take state marine reserves (82.5 square miles/3.5 percent) and no-take state marine conservation areas (33.5 square miles/1.4 percent), with the remainder designated as state marine conservation areas with different take allowances and varying levels of protection. Implementation of the new South Coast MPAs took place on January 1, 2012.

The North Coast region, which stretches from Point Arena to the Oregon border, concluded the stakeholder planning process in August 2010. Stakeholders developed a unified proposal for their regional MPA network supported by fishermen, conservationists, and tribal representatives. The unified plan was adopted by the Fish and Game Commission on June 6, 2012; and will be implemented in 2013.

=== The Science ===
An extensive body of peer-reviewed studies on marine protected areas have concluded that well-designed networks of protected waters are effective in improving ocean health and making ocean waters more resilient. Most recently, the February 2010 issue of the Proceedings of the National Academy of Sciences (PNAS) included several new studies that showed that scientifically-based MPA networks have a net positive impact on both ecosystem productivity and associated fisheries. One of the studies found that such well-designed networks can simultaneously improve the quality of ocean habitat, increase the size and abundance of sea life, and increase fishing yields and profits. Several studies have stressed the importance of location: The location of protected areas is important. In order to be effective, marine reserves must be placed in the areas where fish and shellfish feed and breed.

As a part of the revised MLPA Initiative, scientific analysis and consideration is offered by the CDFG appointed Science Advisory Team (SAT), consisting of a variety of experts in marine, biological, and physical sciences. The cooperation and inclusion of stakeholders as well as scientists in decision making has increased the success of California’s MPAs. Supporting evidence for the positive influence on marine life and ecosystems in California due to the implementation of the Marine Life Protection Act Initiative is provided by the example of the ecological response of protected areas studied in the Channel Islands off the coast of Southern California. Positive response is observed in the example of the increase in California Spiny Lobster biomass and size as a result of no-take designation areas within the Channel Islands MPA. Significant response was also observed in nearby unprotected areas as well, indicating the interconnectedness of marine ecosystems. The extension of MPAs into deeper marine topography accounts for migration to and from coastal regions as well as for species that inhabit different depths throughout their life cycles and increases the efficacy of protection in both cases.

=== Lawsuits ===
On January 27, 2011, a number of member organizations of the Partnership for Sustainable Oceans led by Robert C. Fletcher (a former California Department of Fish and Game Chief Deputy director) filed a lawsuit challenging closures of certain fishing areas under the California Fish and Game Commission (CGFC). The plaintiff's challenged the legality of the CGFC's ability to impose its own regulation and claimed that the commission had violated the California Administrative Procedure Act and the California Environmental Quality Act (CEQA).

As part of administrative state government process, the Game and Fish Commission is required by law to disclose to the public all matters concerning MLPA research, regulation and closures. The BRTF (Blue Ribbon Task Force) and MPT (Master Plan Team), who were charged with the task of conducting research and establishing a conservation plan, had been executively ordered not to disclose the information it had obtained and produced by order of California Resource Secretary Mike Chrisman. Documents obtained in the PRA lawsuit included an email dated April 7, 2007 and advised BRTF members to "give your own notes verbally and throw them away after." This constituted a breach of the California Public Records Act, which states that "the people have the right of access to information concerning the conduct of the people's business".

On March 10, 2011, a California Superior Court ruling found in favor of the plaintiffs, citing that the BRTF and MPT had failed to produce evidence that it complied with the California Public Records act while conducting research from April 2007 through November 2009. It cited that the practices used by the privately funded BRTF and MPT under the GFC did not comply with "open and transparent" processes as outlined in the Public Records Act and ordered the California Game and Fish Commission to pay all legal fees incurred by Mr. Fletcher and his team.

The Fletcher Court decision further declared that the BRTF and Master Science Team were "public bodies." According to the Court: "Based on the facts present here, they cannot be characterized as private contractors or consultants or truly independent advisory bodies, but are "State bodies" engaged in state governmental decision making." The Court arrived at this decision by applying the criteria of the California State University, Fresno Association, Inc. v. Superior Court (2001) case that whether a particular entity qualifies as a governmental agency depends on whether it is performing governmental actions. The Court further found that private individuals on the BRTF and Master Plan Team were not entitled to privacy rights over public records.

There is also a second relevant superior court case of Gurney v. California Department of Fish and Game et al. Superior Court of California in and For the County of Mendocino Case #SCUK-CVG-10-57448. Gurney had attempted to video tape a North Group Initiative Stakeholder Group (SG) meeting where the SG group was split in half to develop different marine reserves or arrays. He was forced to stop for disrupting the meeting. Gurney privately financed suing the Initiative and Fish and Wildlife in order to establish that the Bagley-Keene Open Meeting Act rules—which allow video taping—applied. While the Court could have decided the case on the narrow technical grounds that neither divided group constituted a majority of a public body and therefore there was no quorum, the court issued a more fundamental decision that the SG was not a public body so there were no rights to sue for violations of the California Public Meeting Laws. The court contrasted the SG with the clearly legislatively created and public meeting body the SAT or Master Planning Team.

There is a fascinating side decision in the Gurney case regarding the naming of Melissa Hansen-Miller an employee of the initiative as a party. The California deputy attorney argued in a motion to dismiss her as a named party of the initiative that:

The MLPA Initiative moreover is not an organization, agency, or association of any kind which may be sued in a court of law. While staffed by CNRA and DFG the "Initiative" is not incorporated. It has no officers, and it has no members or association.

The Court granted the motion to dismiss Melissa Hansen-Miller from the case on these grounds.

Despite this de minimis to nonexistent legal status, the 38 million budgeted and highly organized initiative created by Memorandum of Understanding between the Department of Fish and Game, the Resources Agency, and the Resource legacy foundation conducted the largest marine planning effort in California if not U.S. history from 2004 to 2011.

There were substantial controversies between Native Americans and the North Group Science Advisory Team (SAT). The SAT initiated a survey of Native American harvesting which was conducted prior to the issuance of an Institutional Review Board (IRB) permit or conditional exemption. The Tribes wanted to keep answers confidential and have greater Native American participation in the survey. The SAT agreed to keep the answers confidential and established the procedure to do so. The SAT eventually got the necessary I.R.B. permit exemption although there remained a controversy of co-mingling information gathered before the conditional exemption was issued. Native Americans wanted to have a qualified Native American appointed to the SAT. Their first nomination was rejected as unqualified. The second qualified nomination was not acted upon by the Director of Fish and Wildlife. The SAT was asked to treat Native American harvesting separately from state recreational harvesting and the SAT answered that was not legal. On February 11, 2010, meeting the SAT substantially changed the statewide definition of taking used in all other marine regions for the Levels Of Protection (LOP) model. It was changed to be the maximum amount allowed by state and federal law. This meant that million-plus recreational license holders were assumed to harvest the full limit every single day within each proposed North Group marine reserve. Under this assumption, Native American harvesting in thinly populated northern California, in a single reserve, for a single day, was greater than the annual harvest of all of Southern California. Native Americans erupted in a demonstration before the SAT at the June 29, 2010, SAT meeting demanding access to the SAT. Individual, Tribes, and North Coast Tribal Chairman's Association, followed up with requests to allow Tribal PH.D. and other Tribal scientists to get on the agenda and submit written peer-reviewed marine studies. These requests were denied by the SAT. There was a second demonstration on November 17, 2010, by scientists from the Tribes who professionally objected to not being allowed to present to the SAT. The scientists stated their Ph. D. or other educational qualifications and their area of marine research. Native Americans were never allowed to present on the last minute SAT take assumption changes to the Statewide Levels of Protection Model. The LOP model was never independently peer reviewed. The amended LOP model and the science behind it remain controversial to this day.
