= List of California Department of Fish and Wildlife protected areas =

Wildlife areas, ecological reserves, and marine protected areas

This is a list of California Department of Fish and Wildlife protected areas. The California Department of Fish and Wildlife (CDFW), through its seven regional divisions, manages 262 protected areas statewide. This agency was formerly known as the California Department of Fish and Game (CDFG).

== Types ==
The protected areas are broadly categorized as:

- Wildlife areas
- Ecological reserves
- Marine protected areas — under the 1999 Marine Life Protection Act

== List of CDFW protected areas ==
=== Ecological Reserves ===
Site	Designation	DFW region	Acres
Albany Mudflats	Ecological Reserve	Bay Delta	160
Alkali Sink	Ecological Reserve	Central	930
Allensworth	Ecological Reserve	Central	5,100
Atascadero Creek Marsh	Ecological Reserve	Bay Delta	
Bair Island	Ecological Reserve	Bay Delta	3,000
Baldwin Lake	Ecological Reserve	Inland Deserts	
Ballona Wetlands	Ecological Reserve	South Coast	
Batiquitos Lagoon	Ecological Reserve	South Coast	
Blue Sky	Ecological Reserve	South Coast	
Boden Canyon	Ecological Reserve	South Coast	
Boggs Lake	Ecological Reserve	North Central	
Bolsa Chica	Ecological Reserve	South Coast	
Bonny Doon	Ecological Reserve	Bay Delta	552
Buena Vista Lagoon	Ecological Reserve	South Coast	223
Butler Slough	Ecological Reserve	Northern	
Butte Creek	Ecological Reserve	North Central	93 acres Honey Run Unit, 287 acres Virgin Valley" and "Canyon" Units
Butte Creek House	Ecological Reserve	North Central	
Buttonwillow	Ecological Reserve	Central	
By Day Creek	Ecological Reserve	Inland Deserts	
Calhoun Cut	Ecological Reserve	North Central	
Canebrake	Ecological Reserve	Central	6,700
Carlsbad Highlands	Ecological Reserve	South Coast	
Carmel Bay	Ecological Reserve	Bay Delta	
Carrizo Canyon	Ecological Reserve	Inland Deserts	
Carrizo Plains	Ecological Reserve	Bay Delta	
China Point	Ecological Reserve	Northern	
Clover Creek	Ecological Reserve	Northern	
Coachella Valley	Ecological Reserve	Inland Deserts	
Coal Canyon	Ecological Reserve	South Coast	
Corte Madera Marsh	Ecological Reserve	Bay Delta	
Cosumnes River	Ecological Reserve	North Central	51,000+
Crestridge	Ecological Reserve	South Coast	
Dairy Mart Ponds	Ecological Reserve	South Coast	
Dales Lake	Ecological Reserve	Northern	
Del Mar Landing	Ecological Reserve	Bay Delta	
Eden Landing	Ecological Reserve	Bay Delta	5,040
Elkhorn Slough	Ecological Reserve	Central	1,700
Estelle Mountain	Ecological Reserve	Inland Deserts	
Fall River Mills	Ecological Reserve	Northern	
Fish Slough	Ecological Reserve	Inland Deserts	
Fremont Valley	Ecological Reserve	Central	
Goleta Slough	Ecological Reserve	South Coast	
Indian Joe Spring	Ecological Reserve	Inland Deserts	
Joshua Creek Canyon Ecological Reserve	Ecological Reserve	Monterey County	5,887.31
Kaweah	Ecological Reserve	Central	
Kerman	Ecological Reserve	Central	
King Clone	Ecological Reserve	Inland Deserts	
Laguna Laurel	Ecological Reserve	South Coast	
Loch Lomond Vernal Pool	Ecological Reserve	North Central	8.22
Lokern	Ecological Reserve	Central	
Magnesia Spring	Ecological Reserve	Inland Deserts	3,800
Marin Islands	Ecological Reserve	Bay Delta	
Mattole River	Ecological Reserve	Bay Delta	
McGinty Mountain	Ecological Reserve	South Coast	
Morro Dunes	Ecological Reserve	Bay Delta	
Morro Rock	Ecological Reserve	Bay Delta	
Napa River	Ecological Reserve	Bay Delta	
North Table Mountain	Ecological Reserve	North Central	3,315
Oasis Spring	Ecological Reserve	Inland Deserts	
Panoche Hills	Ecological Reserve	Central	
Peytonia Slough	Ecological Reserve	Bay Delta	
Piute Creek	Ecological Reserve	Inland Deserts	
Pleasant Valley	Ecological Reserve	Central	
Point Lobos	Ecological Reserve	Bay Delta	550 acres onshore; 775 offshore 775
Rancho Jamul	Ecological Reserve	South Coast	8,926
Redwood Shores	Ecological Reserve	Bay Delta	
River Springs Lakes	Ecological Reserve	Inland Deserts	
Saline Valley	Ecological Reserve	Inland Deserts	
San Dieguito Lagoon	Ecological Reserve	South Coast	
San Elijo Lagoon	Ecological Reserve	South Coast	
San Felipe Creek	Ecological Reserve	Inland Deserts	
San Joaquin River	Ecological Reserve	Central	
Santa Rosa Plateau	Ecological Reserve	Inland Deserts	8,400
Springville	Ecological Reserve	Central	
Stone Corral	Ecological Reserve	Central	
Sycamore Canyon	Ecological Reserve	Inland Deserts	
Sycuan Peak	Ecological Reserve	South Coast	
Thomes Creek	Ecological Reserve	Northern	
Tomales Bay	Ecological Reserve	Bay Delta	
Upper Newport Bay	Ecological Reserve	South Coast	1,000
Watsonville Slough	Ecological Reserve	Bay Delta	
West Mojave Desert	Ecological Reserve	Inland Deserts	
Woodbridge	Ecological Reserve	North Central	
Yaudanchi	Ecological Reserve	Central	

=== Marine Conservation Areas ===
Site	Designation	DFW region
Anacapa	State Marine Conservation Area	Marine
Año Nuevo *	State Marine Conservation Area	Marine
Atascadero Beach	State Marine Conservation Area	Marine
Big Creek *	State Marine Conservation Area	Marine
Cambria *	State Marine Conservation Area	Marine
Cardiff and San Elijo	State Marine Conservation Area	Marine
Carmel Bay	State Marine Conservation Area	Marine
Crystal Cove	State Marine Conservation Area	Marine
Doheny	State Marine Conservation Area	Marine
Duxbury Reef	State Marine Conservation Area	Marine
Edward F. Ricketts *	State Marine Conservation Area	Marine
Elkhorn Slough *	State Marine Conservation Area	Marine
Encinitas	State Marine Conservation Area	Marine
Estero de Limantour	State Marine Conservation Area	Marine
Farallon Islands	State Marine Conservation Area	Marine
Farnsworth Bank	State Marine Conservation Area	Marine
Fort Ross	State Marine Conservation Area	Marine
Gerstle Cove	State Marine Conservation Area	Marine
Greyhound Rock *	State Marine Conservation Area	Marine
Julia Pfeiffer Burns	State Marine Conservation Area	Marine
La Jolla	State Marine Conservation Area	Marine
Lovers Cove (Catalina Island)	State Marine Conservation Area	Marine
MacKerricher	State Marine Conservation Area	Marine
Manchester and Arena Rock	State Marine Conservation Area	Marine
Mia J. Tegner	State Marine Conservation Area	Marine
Morro Beach	State Marine Conservation Area	Marine
Pacific Grove Marine Gardens	State Marine Conservation Area	Marine
Painted Cave	State Marine Conservation Area	Marine
Piedras Blancas *	State Marine Conservation Area	Marine
Pismo	State Marine Conservation Area	Marine
Pismo-Oceano Beach	State Marine Conservation Area	Marine
Point Buchon *	State Marine Conservation Area	Marine
Point Cabrillo	State Marine Conservation Area	Marine
Point Lobos	State Marine Conservation Area	Marine
Point Reyes Headlands	State Marine Conservation Area	Marine
Point Sur *	State Marine Conservation Area	Marine
Portuguese Ledge *	State Marine Conservation Area	Marine
Pyramid Point	State Marine Conservation Area	Marine
Refugio	State Marine Conservation Area	Marine
Robert W. Crown	State Marine Conservation Area	Marine
Russian Gulch	State Marine Conservation Area	Marine
Salt Point	State Marine Conservation Area	Marine
San Diego-Scripps	State Marine Conservation Area	Marine
Sonoma Coast	State Marine Conservation Area	Marine
Soquel Canyon *	State Marine Conservation Area	Marine
Van Damme	State Marine Conservation Area	Marine
White Rock (Cambria) *	State Marine Conservation Area	Marine
Abalone Cove	State Marine Park	Marine
Albany Mudflats	State Marine Park	Marine
Bair Island	State Marine Park	Marine
Batiquitos Lagoon	State Marine Park	Marine
Bolsa Chica	State Marine Park	Marine
Buena Vista Lagoon	State Marine Park	Marine
Corte Madera Marsh	State Marine Park	Marine
Dana Point	State Marine Park	Marine
Del Mar Landing	State Marine Park	Marine
Doheny	State Marine Park	Marine
Fagan Marsh	State Marine Park	Marine
Goleta Slough	State Marine Park	Marine
Irvine Coast	State Marine Park	Marine
James V. Fitzgerald	State Marine Park	Marine
Laguna Beach	State Marine Park	Marine
Marin Islands	State Marine Park	Marine
Niguel	State Marine Park	Marine
Peytonia Slough	State Marine Park	Marine
Point Fermin	State Marine Park	Marine
Redwood Shores	State Marine Park	Marine
Robert E. Badham	State Marine Park	Marine
San Dieguito Lagoon	State Marine Park	Marine
San Elijo Lagoon	State Marine Park	Marine
South Laguna Beach	State Marine Park	Marine
Tomales Bay	State Marine Park	Marine
Upper Newport Bay	State Marine Park	Marine
Morro Bay *	State Marine Recreational Management Area	Marine
Agua Hedionda Lagoon	State Marine Reserve	Marine
Anacapa	State Marine Reserve	Marine
Asilomar *	State Marine Reserve	Marine
Big Creek	State Marine Reserve	Marine
Big Sycamore Canyon	State Marine Reserve	Marine
Bodega	State Marine Reserve	Marine
Carmel Pinnacles *	State Marine Reserve	Marine
Carrington Point	State Marine Reserve	Marine
Catalina Marine Science Center	State Marine Reserve	Marine
Elkhorn Slough	State Marine Reserve	Marine
Gull Island	State Marine Reserve	Marine
Harris Point	State Marine Reserve	Marine
Heisler Park	State Marine Reserve	Marine
Hopkins	State Marine Reserve	Marine
Judith Rock	State Marine Reserve	Marine
Lovers Point *	State Marine Reserve	Marine
Moro Cojo Slough *	State Marine Reserve	Marine
Morro Bay *	State Marine Reserve	Marine
Natural Bridges *	State Marine Reserve	Marine
Piedras Blancas *	State Marine Reserve	Marine
Point Buchon *	State Marine Reserve	Marine
Point Lobos	State Marine Reserve	Marine
Point Sur *	State Marine Reserve	Marine
Punta Gorda	State Marine Reserve	Marine
Richardson Rock	State Marine Reserve	Marine
Santa Barbara Island	State Marine Reserve	Marine
Scorpion	State Marine Reserve	Marine
Skunk Point	State Marine Reserve	Marine
South Point	State Marine Reserve	Marine
Vandenberg	State Marine Reserve	Marine

=== Wildlife and Wilderness Areas ===
Site	Designation	DFW region
Antelope Valley	Wildlife Area	North Central
Ash Creek	Wildlife Area	Northern
Bass Hill	Wildlife Area	Northern
Battle Creek	Wildlife Area	Northern
Big Lagoon	Wildlife Area	Northern
Big Sandy	Wildlife Area	Central
Biscar	Wildlife Area	Northern
Butte Valley	Wildlife Area	Northern
Buttermilk Country	Wildlife Area	Inland Deserts
Cache Creek	Wildlife Area	North Central
Camp Cady	Wildlife Area	Inland Deserts
Cantara/Ney Springs	Wildlife Area	Northern
Cedar Roughs	Wildlife Area	Bay Delta
Cinder Flats	Wildlife Area	Northern
Collins Eddy	Wildlife Area	North Central
Colusa Bypass	Wildlife Area	North Central
Coon Hollow	Wildlife Area	North Central
Cottonwood Creek	Wildlife Area	Central
Crescent City Marsh	Wildlife Area	Northern
Crocker Meadows	Wildlife Area	North Central
Daugherty Hill	Wildlife Area	North Central
Decker Island	Wildlife Area	Bay Delta
Doyle	Wildlife Area	Northern
Dutch Flat	Wildlife Area	Northern
Eastlker River	Wildlife Area	Inland Deserts
Eel River	Wildlife Area	Northern
Elk Creek Wetlands	Wildlife Area	Northern
Elk River	Wildlife Area	Northern
Fay Slough	Wildlife Area	Northern
Feather River	Wildlife Area	North Central
Fitzhugh Creek	Wildlife Area	Northern
Fremont Weir	Wildlife Area	North Central
Grass Lake	Wildlife Area	Northern
Gray Lodge	Wildlife Area	North Central
Green Creek	Wildlife Area	Inland Deserts
Grizzly Island	Wildlife Area	Bay Delta
Hallelujah Junction	Wildlife Area	North Central
Heenan Lake	Wildlife Area	North Central
Hill Slough	Wildlife Area	Bay Delta
Hollenbeck Canyon	Wildlife Area	South Coast
Honey Lake	Wildlife Area	Northern
Hope Valley	Wildlife Area	North Central
Horseshoe Ranch	Wildlife Area	Northern
Imperial	Wildlife Area	Inland Deserts
Indian Valley	Wildlife Area	North Central
Kelso Peak and Old Dad Mountains	Wildlife Area	Inland Deserts
Kinsman Flat	Wildlife Area	Central
Knoxville	Wildlife Area	Bay Delta
Laguna	Wildlife Area	Bay Delta
Lake Berryessa	Wildlife Area	Bay Delta
Lake Earl	Wildlife Area	Northern
Lake Sonoma	Wildlife Area	Bay Delta
Little Panoche Reservoir	Wildlife Area	Central
Los Banos	Wildlife Area	Central
Lower Sherman Island	Wildlife Area	Bay Delta
Mad River Slough	Wildlife Area	Northern
Marble Mountains	Wildlife Area	Inland Deserts
Mendota	Wildlife Area	Central
Merrill's Landing	Wildlife Area	Northern
Miner Slough	Wildlife Area	Bay Delta
Monache Meadows	Wildlife Area	Central
Morro Bay	Wildlife Area	Central
Moss Landing	Wildlife Area	Central
Mouth of Cottonwood Creek	Wildlife Area	Northern
Napa-Sonoma Marshes	Wildlife Area	Bay Delta
North Grasslands	Wildlife Area	Central
O'Neill Forebay	Wildlife Area	Central
Oroville	Wildlife Area	North Central
Petaluma Marsh	Wildlife Area	Bay Delta
Pickel Meadow	Wildlife Area	Inland Deserts
Pine Creek	Wildlife Area	Northern
Point Edith	Wildlife Area	Bay Delta
Putah Creek	Wildlife Area	Bay Delta
Rector Reservoir	Wildlife Area	Bay Delta
Red Lake	Wildlife Area	North Central
Rhode Island	Wildlife Area	Bay Delta
Sacramento River	Wildlife Area	North Central
San Felipe Valley	Wildlife Area	South Coast
San Jacinto	Wildlife Area	Inland Deserts
San Luis Obispo	Wildlife Area	Central
San Luis Reservoir	Wildlife Area	Central
San Pablo Bay	Wildlife Area	Bay Delta
Santa Rosa	Wildlife Area	Inland Deserts
Shasta Valley	Wildlife Area	Northern
Silver Creek	Wildlife Area	Northern
Slinkard/Little Antelope	Wildlife Area	Inland Deserts
Smithneck Creek	Wildlife Area	North Central
South Fork	Wildlife Area	Central
Spenceville	Wildlife Area	North Central
Surprise Valley	Wildlife Area	Northern
Sutter Bypass	Wildlife Area	North Central
Tehama	Wildlife Area	Northern
Truckee River	Wildlife Area	North Central
Upper Butte Basin	Wildlife Area	North Central
Volta	Wildlife Area	Central
Warner Valley	Wildlife Area	North Central
Waukell Creek	Wildlife Area	Northern
West Hilmar	Wildlife Area	Central
Westlker River	Wildlife Area	Inland Deserts
White Slough	Wildlife Area	Bay Delta
Willow Creek	Wildlife Area	Northern
Yolo Bypass	Wildlife Area	Bay Delta

* Indicates protected area status that came into effect on September 21, 2007.

== See also ==
- List of marine protected areas of California
