= Magnesia Spring Ecological Reserve =

Protected area of California, US

- IUCN category V (protected landscape/seascape)
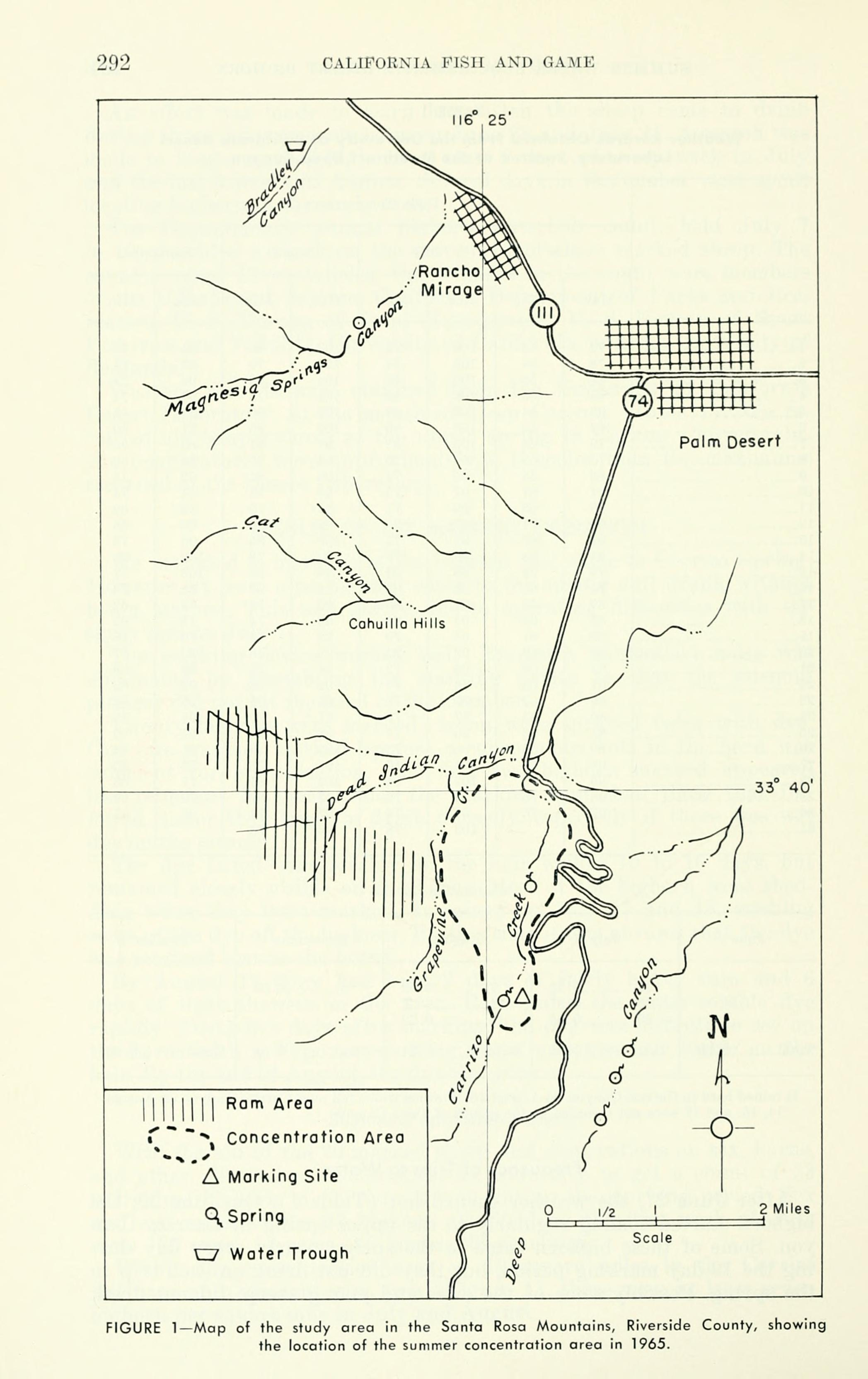
- Interactive map of Magnesia Spring Ecological Reserve
- Nearest city: Rancho Mirage, California
- Coordinates: 33.7247°N 116.4364°W
- Area: 3,800 acres (1,500 ha)
- Established: 1975
- Governing body: California Department of Fish and Wildlife

Magnesia Spring Ecological Reserve is a California Department of Fish and Wildlife–protected area of the inland desert region of California, United States. The canyon, one of the natural attractions of the greater Palm Springs area of the Coachella Valley, is known for its "colorful layered rock walls and palm tree oases". The reserve was established in 1975, in part because the spring is an important water source for desert bighorn sheep.

Magnesia Spring Canyon is part of the Santa Rosa Mountains National Scenic Area along with the Santa Rosa Mountains Wildlife Area and Carrizo Canyon Ecological Reserve.

== Geography ==
The reserve is drained in part by West Magnesia Spring Canyon Creek, a tributary of the Whitewater River. Magnesia Spring lies within the Southern Mojave–Salton Sea water resource subregion, specifically the Indio subbasin. The spring itself is perennial. According to a U.S. government geologist, Magnesia Spring is a "small amount of water that effervesces with carbon dioxide and is also locally believed to contain a notable amount of magnesium. As the spring is about 2 miles from the main road along the west side of the desert and is reached only by a dim trail, it has not been often visited."

== Flora and fauna ==
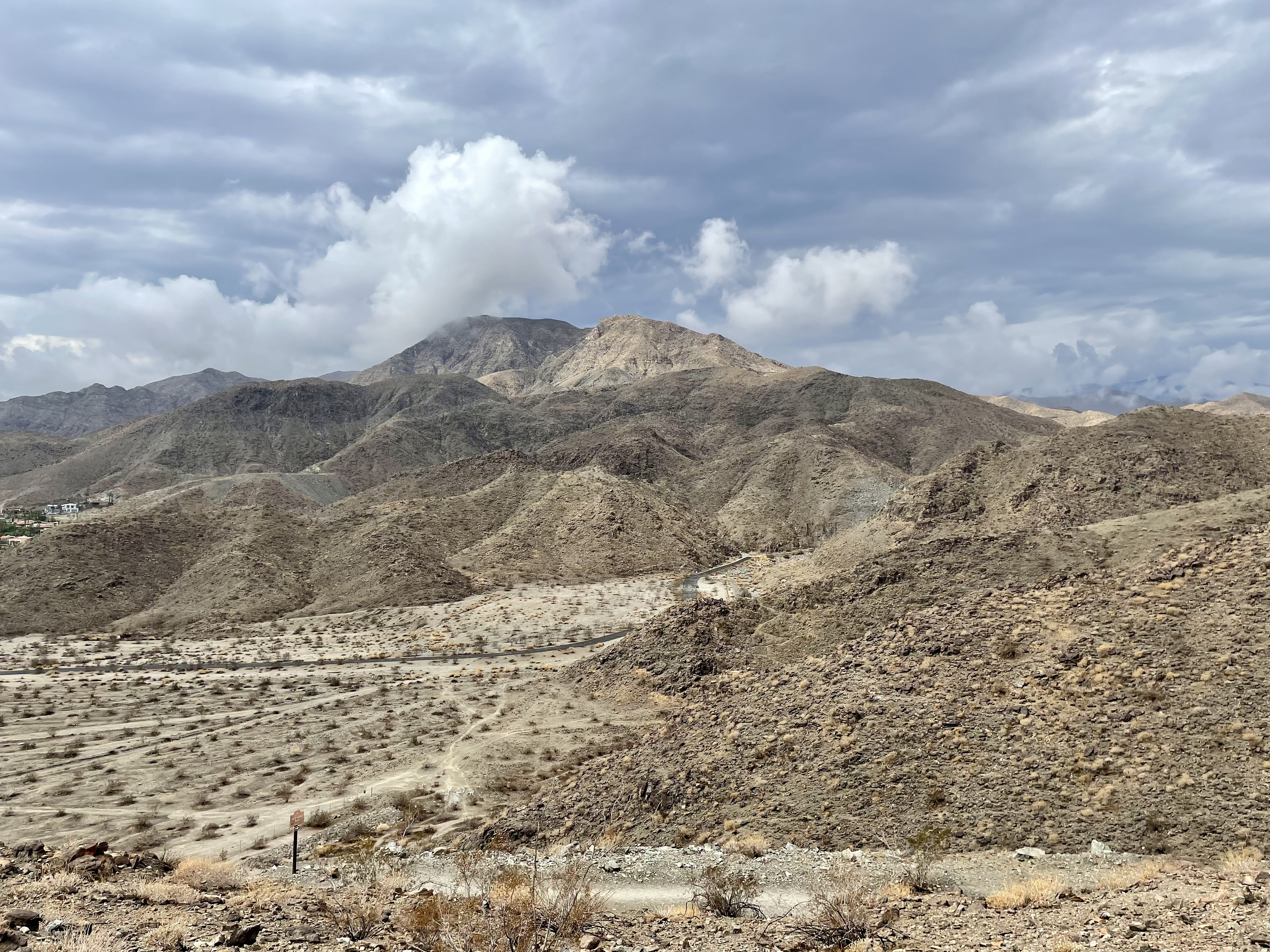
View of the Santa Rosa Mountains from Rancho Mirage

The area is dominated by creosote, cacti, and Encelia farinosa (California brittlebrush). The Bureau of Land Management deems the canyon "vital" habitat for bighorn sheep. The canyon also supports several raptor species and their small mammalian prey.

== History ==
The canyon is archaeologically significant and bedrock mortars, potsherds, and olla caves have all been found in the area. A 1920 book devoted to marketing the Palm Springs area to newcomers described the canyon as a worthwhile day trip:

Magnesia Spring Cañon opens to the southwest upon the main valley road near Frye's Well, about twelve miles from Palm Springs (being the next cañon to the northwest of Deep Cañon.) It is quite easy of access, the approach being sandy instead of bouldery, but automobiles may find difficulty after leaving the main road (at a point opposite Frye's old house.) At the narrows, about two miles from the mouth, there are fine cliffs; also a little water, not of the best quality, yet drinkable; and a rock-bound pool large enough for a miniature swim. In the upper cañon there are a number of palms. This cañon makes a pleasant objective for a picnic, or for a one or two days' camping-trip.

Visitors to Magnesia Springs canyon in 1928 found "a little stream emerging from a rock amphitheater, where it had tumbled over a 50-foot water fall. High on the wall above was a single palm growing out of the solid rock." D-Day, a sickly bighorn lamb rescued on June 6, 1982, was rehabilitated, fathered four lambs of his own while in captivity, and was released into the wild at Magnesia Spring in 1985.

== See also ==
- Tahquitz Canyon
- San Jacinto Wildlife Area
- List of California Department of Fish and Wildlife protected areas
