= Spenceville, California =

Spenceville
- Former settlement
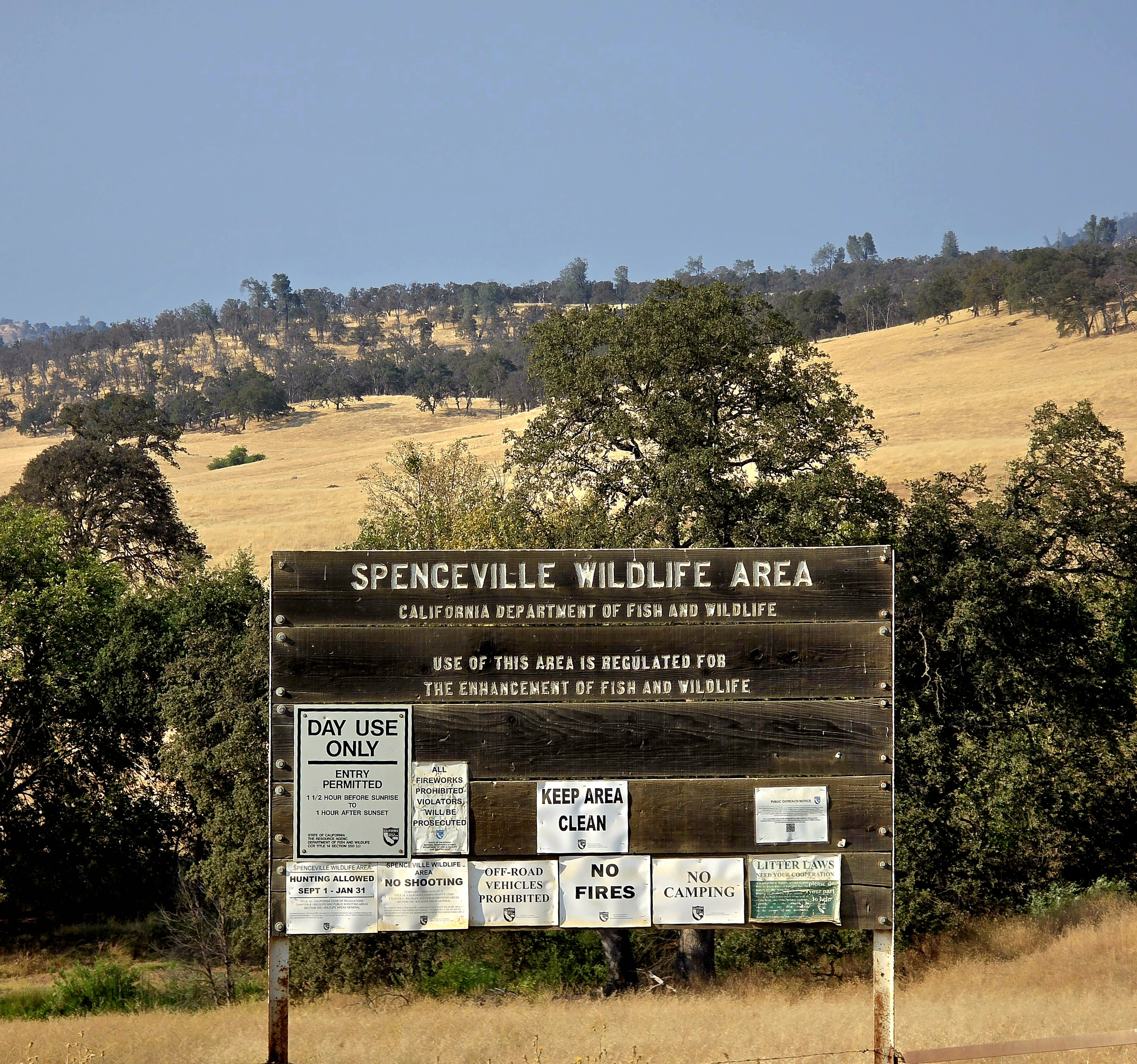
- Spenceville Wildlife Area sign near the former town site

- Location in California
- Coordinates: 39°06′53″N 121°16′06″W
- Country: United States
- State: California
- County: Nevada County
- Time zone: UTC-8 (Pacific (PST))
  - Summer (DST): UTC-7 (PDT)

Spenceville was a ranching, farming and mining community located in the southwestern part of Nevada County, California, on Spenceville Road just east of Waldo Road, about 17 miles (27 km) from Grass Valley. Its elevation was about 400 feet (120 m). The former townsite is now part of the Spenceville Wildlife Area.

== Early history ==
The area was long occupied by Nisenan Indians, and evidence of their habitation, such as grinding rocks, can be found in the area. White settlers and prospectors begin to arrive in the 1840s. The Nisenan were removed from the area by a series on treaties beginning in 1850, which the Congress never ratified.

Spenceville was never a major gold producing area, in part because the very rich auriferous channel that runs down the San Juan Ridge turns west a few miles north of Spenceville, towards Smartsville and Timbuctoo. The early settlers were farmers and ranchers. In the early 1860s, copper ore was found while digging a well on Purtyman's Ranch. The Well Lead (or Lode), later known as the Well Copper Mine, and its surrounding ranch, soon became the town of Spenceville, named for Edward Spence, a druggist and property owner in Nevada City with interests in the Well Copper Mine. Spence also donated the lumber for a new school house built in 1868.

== Copper mining ==
Copper mining at Spenceville expanded with the discovery of the Last Chance Mine, so called because James Downey had just about given up mining when he found a promising spot and proclaimed "this is the last chance—if I don't strike it here I'll give it up". Still, copper mining initially was not very profitable. Much of the ore was low grade and the early processes for extracting the copper from the ore were not very efficient. Generally ore had to be transported to a distant processing facility such as a smelter. There are even reports of copper ore being sent to Wales for processing. A fall in the price of copper following the Civil War caused a slump in the Spenceville copper mines.

In the mid-1870s, a number of the copper mines around Spenceville were consolidated into the San Francisco Copper Company. The Company substantially improved the roasting and leaching method for processing the copper and operated successfully for a number of years. In 1880, the engineering works, located above the mine, caved in. The mine continued to operate until 1887, falling victim to declining copper prices. In 1890, the Imperial Paint and Copper Company acquired the property. It did not mine but worked the refuse from earlier mining to manufacture a brown paint which was touted as fire and water proof and "superior to any of the metallic paints imported from the East or from Europe." It was soon discovered that during rain, the sulphur in the paint produced sulphuric acid which ate into the heads of the nails holding down wood shingles and siding. In 1897, the property was acquired by the Spence Mineral Company for the purpose of manufacturing sulphuric acid. A fire in 1915 ended that enterprise.

World War I saw an increase in demand for copper and a revival of some of the Spenceville copper mines. Once the war ended in 1918, copper mining around Spenceville was largely shut down. Over $1 million of copper had been mined. The dark side of copper mining was that it created a lot of pollution and environmental contamination. Contemporary news articles report on the fumes from the copper smelter killing the greenery, including trees, in the area.

== The town's heyday ==
During the 1870s, the town had a post office, three general stores, a hotel and was home to about four hundred people. A school was established; it had 48 students in 1867. A new schoolhouse was built in 1868 on land where the Spenceville Copper Mine buildings were later built. The schoolhouse was then moved further up the road. Spenceville also had a Methodist Church and a Templar Lodge, organized in 1865. A Sunday school had 42 pupils in 1864. The town had a popular baseball team, the White Stockings. A Spenceville election district was established in 1862. 50 people voted in the 1864 presidential election, 33 for Lincoln. The election district was discontinued as copper mining declined but reestablished in 1879. Spenceville was connected by stage to Wheatland, Smartsville and Grass Valley. In the early 1900s, there was considerable talk about a railroad being built to connect points in the Sacramento Valley with Grass Valley and Nevada City, running through Spenceville. It was promoted in part as expediting the shipment of copper ore from Spenceville, but the railroad never materialized.

== Ranching and farming ==
Apart from mining, ranching and farming were prominent. As one historian noted, "Citrus fruits and all kinds of deciduous fruits grow here to perfection." Just west of Spenceville, enterprising black farmers grew cabbages, which provided vitamin C for miners to treat scurvy, giving rise to the town of Cabbage Patch, later Waldo. Sheep and cattle were pastured, wherever alfalfa and other grains were not grown.

== The Kneebones and Bitners ==
One of the prominent Spenceville families was the Kneebones. Joseph Kneebone, Sr. came from Cornwall, England, in 1867, and purchased a ranch near Spenceville. He started a successful teaming business transporting merchandise from Wheatland to North San Juan and as far east as Virginia City. He and his wife Mary had seven children. In a family cemetery overlooking the Kneebone Ranch are buried five family members, including Joseph Sr. and Jr.. murdered about 20 years apart.

Another prominent family was the Bitners. Cyrus and Mary Bitner, and their two daughters, moved to Spenceville from Iowa in 1873. A Civil War veteran, Captain Bitner owned interests in a number of the copper mines around Spenceville as well as in gold mines throughout Nevada County. He served as Spenceville's justice of the peace.

In June 2025, the Nevada County Board of Supervisors designated the Kneebone Ranch and Cemetery as Nevada County Historical Landmark NEV-25-06, recognizing the Kneebone family's 19th-century teaming and ranching activities in the Spenceville area.

== Modern times ==
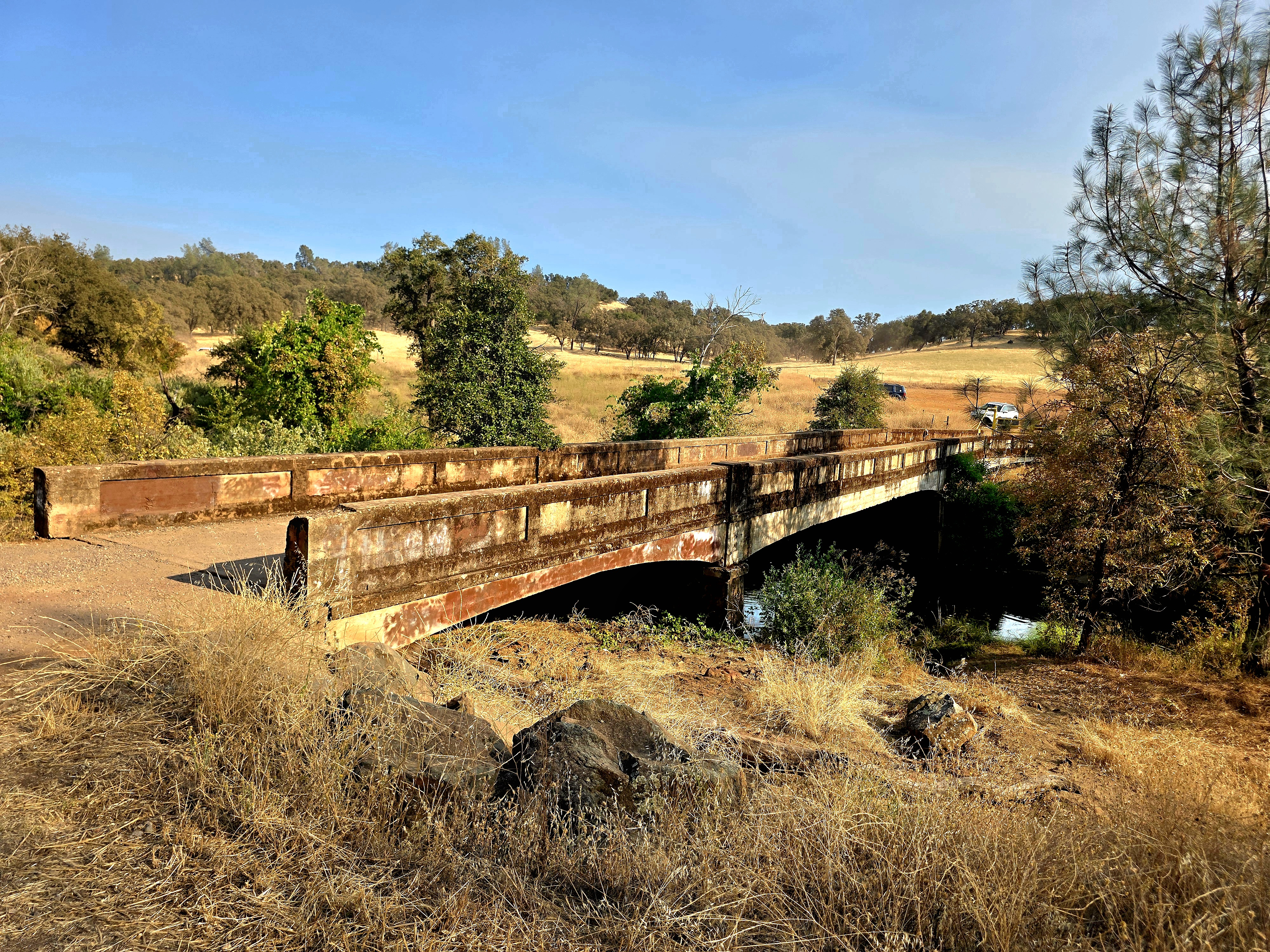
Bridge over Little Dry Creek at former community of Spenceville

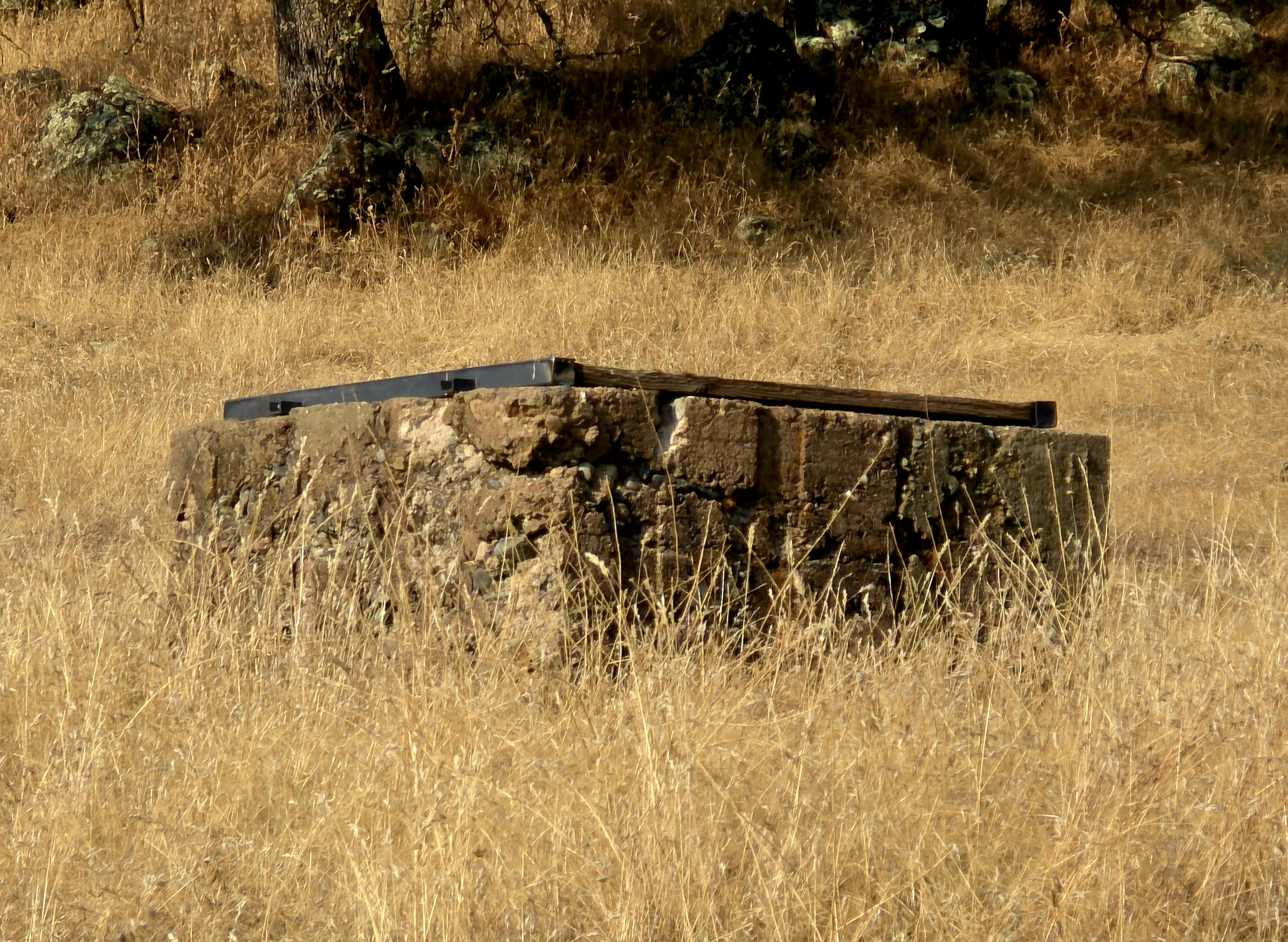
Spenceville structure remains

With the collapse of copper mining following World War I, Spenceville began a rapid decline. The school district lapsed in 1920. The post office closed in 1932. During World War II, the United States acquired by eminent domain much of the area around Spenceville and established a training facility. The town site, renamed Spenceburg, was used to simulate a German town. In 1964, the United States sold part of the land, and retained the part that became Beale Air Force Base. California acquired some of the land and created the Spenceville Wildlife Area. A lengthy and expensive effort to clean up the environmental contamination was completed by 2013. The Spenceville Wildlife Area has become a popular site for hiking and recreation. There are few traces left of the old town and mine.

== See also ==
- Spenceville Wildlife Area
