= North Table Mountain Ecological Reserve =

Nature reserve in northern California

- IUCN category IV (habitat/species management area)
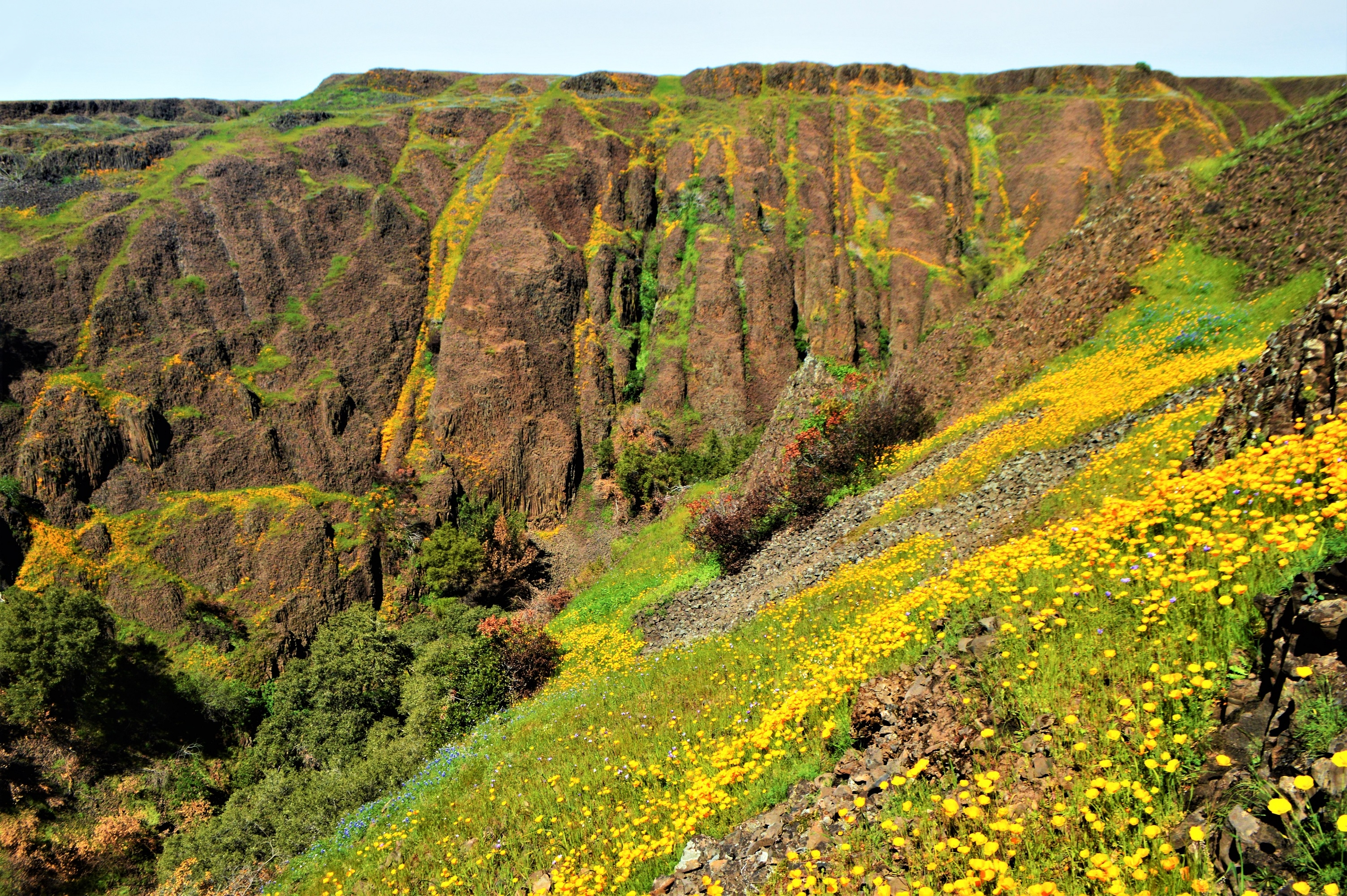

- Location within California Location within the United States
- Location: Butte County, northern California
- Nearest city: Oroville
- Coordinates: 39°38′10″N 121°33′00″W
- Area: 3,315 acres (13.42 km^{2})
- Established: August 23, 1993
- Governing body: California Department of Fish and Wildlife

The North Table Mountain Ecological Reserve is a nature reserve of 3,315 acres (13.42 km^{2}) located three miles (5 km) north of Oroville, in Butte County, northern California. The land was acquired by the state in October, 1993.

== Ecology ==
The reserve protects and preserves the rare Northern Basalt Flow Vernal Pools, a vernal pools habitat type that supports sensitive plants and animals that are either locally endemic, or endemic to California. The Northern Basalt Flow Vernal Pools habitat is found in only four localities within the state.

Time and erosion have split the volcanic plateau of Table Mountain into two sections, north and south. There are smaller ravines as well that support various types of trees and woodlands. The top expanse has grasslands with lichen-covered rocks. The winter/spring rains recharge the vernal pools and create waterfalls and wildflower displays.

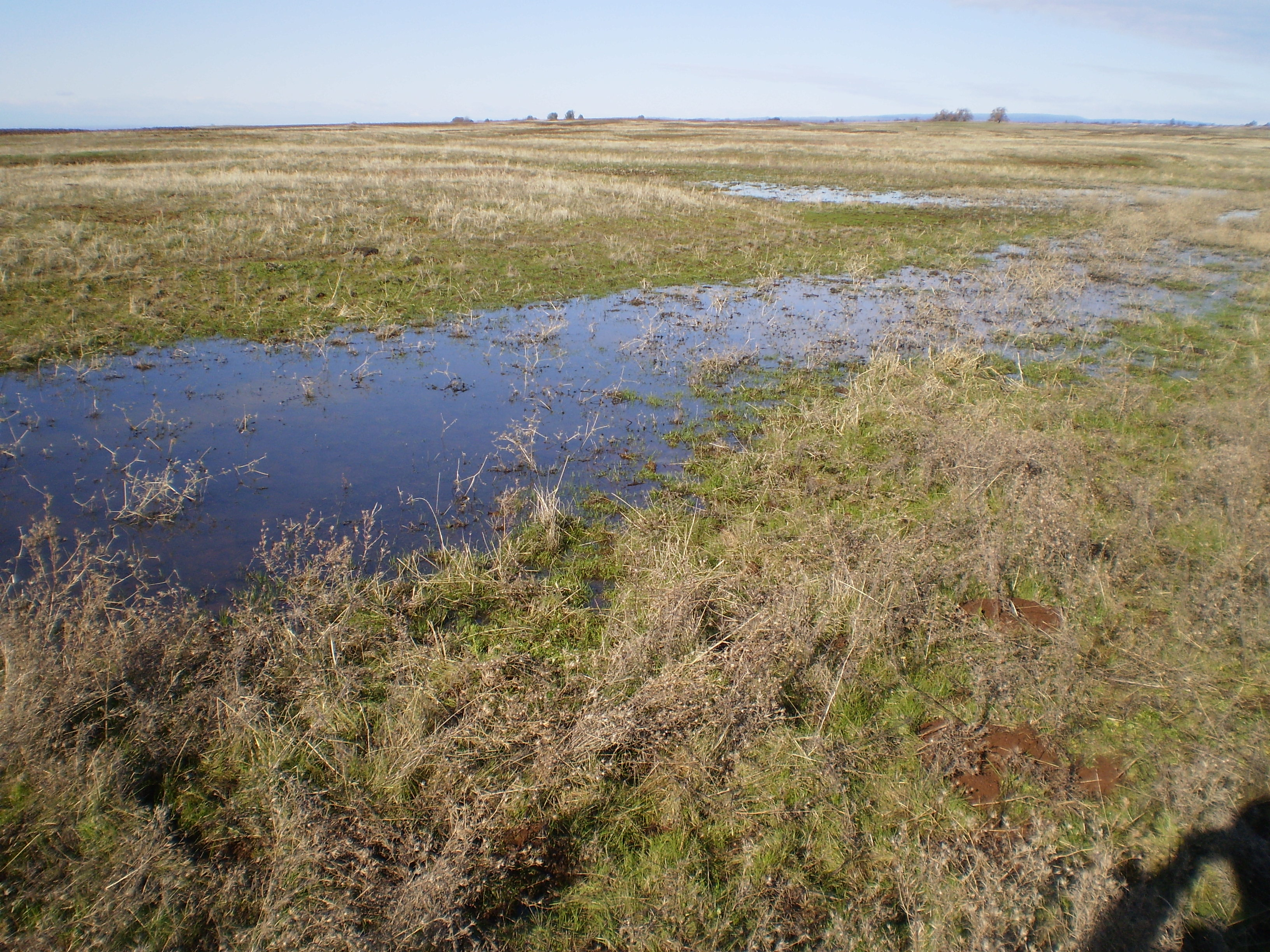
North Table Mountain Ecological Reserve

=== Biota ===
Sensitive plant and animal species that occur on the preserve include:

- Limnanthes floccosa ssp. californica — Butte County meadowfoam
- Juncus leiospermus var. leiospermus — Red Bluff dwarf rush
- Phrynosoma coronatumfrontale — California horned lizard.

Trees in the ravine habitats include native oaks, madrones, California buckeyes, and California bays.

Birds seen include golden eagle, turkey vulture and peregrine falcon, to the small canyon wren and meadowlark.

== Hunting management ==
In 2003, the California Department of Fish and Wildlife (CDFW) added North Table Mountain Ecological Reserve to the list of reserves under Title 14, California Code of Regulations, with special regulations that prohibit horses and bicycles from entering the reserve, but allows the department to issue livestock grazing permits, and also allows deer and upland game hunting with seasonal restrictions.

Since hunting is not normally permitted on ecological reserves, the special regulations are necessary so that DFG can determine when this public use is appropriate and will cause no impacts to protected species and habitat.

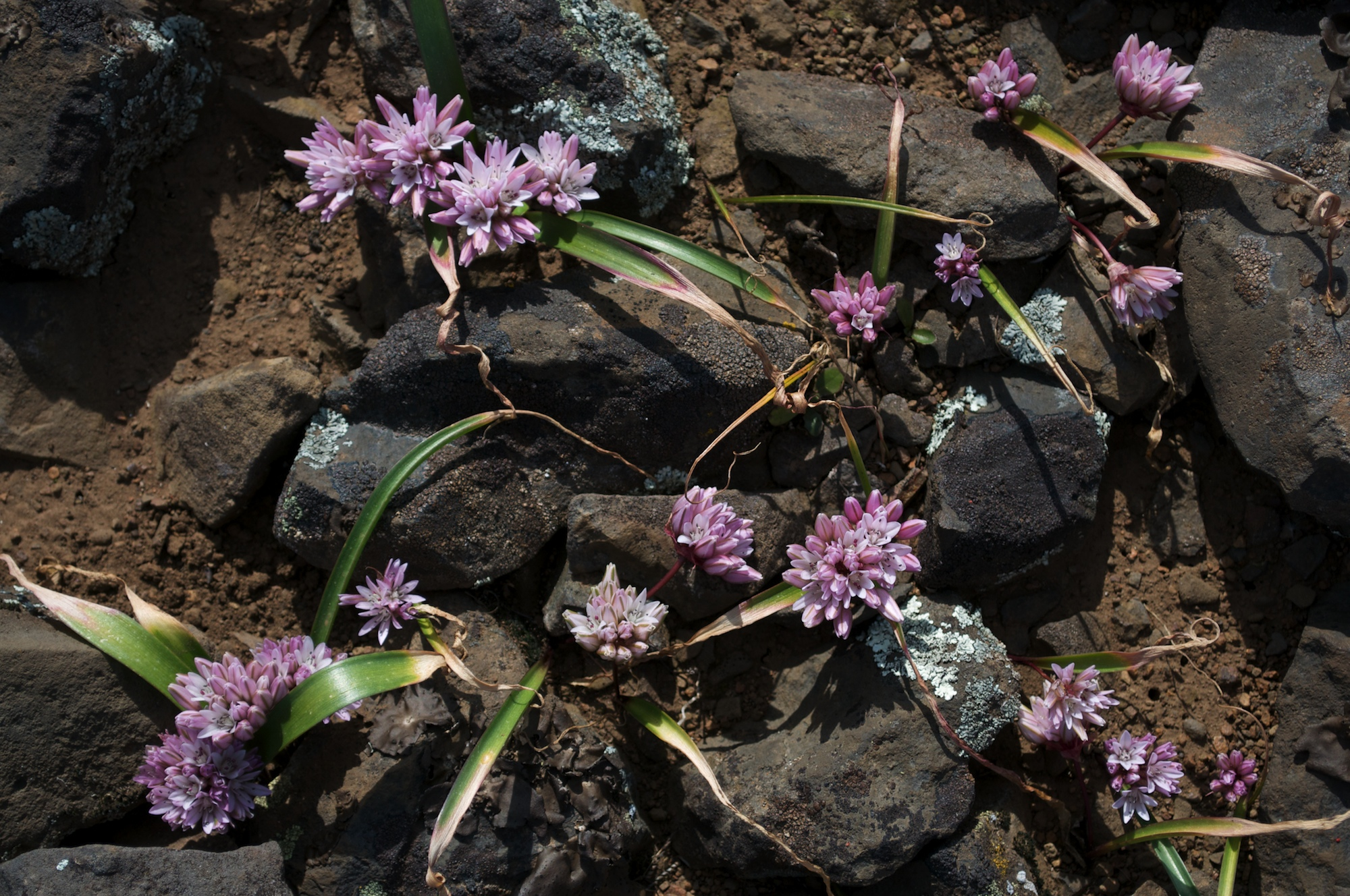
Allium cratericola blooming in the preserve.

== See also ==
- Vernal pool
- List of California Department of Fish and Game protected areas
- Natural history of the Central Valley of California
