= Butte Creek Ecological Reserve =

Protected area in California, USA

Butte Creek Ecological Preserve and Butte Creek Canyon Ecological Reserve
- IUCN category Ia (strict nature reserve)
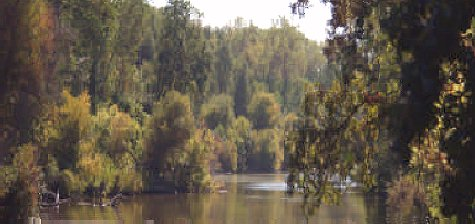
- Lower Butte Creek

- Location within California
- Location: Butte County, eastern Sacramento Valley
- Nearest city: Chico, California
- Coordinates: 40°05′16″N 121°24′57″W
- Area: 378 acres (0.591 sq mi)
- Governing body: California Department of Fish and Game / California State University, Chico Research Foundation

The Butte Creek Ecological Preserve and Butte Creek Canyon Ecological Reserve consist of 2 distinct management units, the Preserve, aka the "Honey Run Unit" 93 acres (0.38 km^{2}) owned and managed by the Chico State Research Foundation, and the "Virgin Valley" and "Canyon" Units 287 acres (1.16 km^{2}), owned and managed by the California Department of Fish and Wildlife. The units are located east of Chico along Butte Creek in northern California. This stretch of Butte Creek is spawning habitat for the largest population of Central Valley spring-run Chinook salmon, an evolutionarily significant unit that is listed as threatened under the Endangered Species Act. Fall-run Chinook salmon and steelhead trout also spawn in the creek.

The California Department of Fish and Wildlife considers the Butte Creek Canyon Ecological Reserve valuable in terms of providing wildlife habitat and protection of critical shaded riverine and aquatic resources.

The Butte Creek population of Central Valley spring-run Chinook salmon is the largest and one of the few remaining self-sustaining populations in the Central Valley, and is listed as threatened under both the state and federal endangered species acts. The reserves protect habitat for other species such as bald eagle, Swainson's hawk, beaver and the western pond turtle.

At the headwaters of Butte Creek is a separate nature reserve called the Butte Creek House Ecological Reserve is managed by the California Department of Fish and Wildlife (CDFW).

== Reserve units detail ==
=== Butte Creek Canyon Unit ===
This unit is located two miles (3 km) southeast of the City of Chico and is 255 acres (1.03 km^{2}) in size. It is managed by CDFW. This unit has a high amount of non-native grasses (over 40 per cent) and several sensitive or rare plants, including California black walnut (Juglans hindsii) and shield-bracted monkey flower (Mimulus glaucescens).

=== Virgin Valley Unit ===
This unit is 30 acres (120,000 m^{2}) in size and is also managed by CDFW. It is one half mile downstream from the Butte Creek canyon mouth on an alluvial apron. This unit contains forests of valley oak (Quercus lobata) growing on streamside terraces and on the alluvial aggregate.

=== Honey Run Unit ===
This unit is managed by Chico State University Research Foundation in cooperation with other agencies and is located within the Butte Creek canyon proper. It is 93 acres (380,000 m^{2}) in size.

The area of Butte Creek had been used in dredge mining from the 1800s to about 1950, and mining for sand and gravel from the 1950s to the 1970s. In 1980, a cluster development project of 75 condominiums was approved for the site by the Butte County Planning Commission and the Board of Supervisors. The project was stopped by concerned local citizens with a successful ballot initiative that overturned the Butte County decision.

The flood of 1986, which caused more than $13 million damage in Butte County, washed out the two bridge crossings on Butte Creek and helped start the preservation sequence of events. The bridges connected to the haul road that went from the gravel mining sites to Baldwin Construction's plant. Soon after the historic flood, the mining company sold its properties, with some parcels being bought by the California Department of Fish and Game, and one parcel (the Honey Run unit) being bought by John McAmis. McAmis contracted for a subdivision of single family homes, which was voted down by the Planning Commission, but a subsequent development plan was submitted and approved. After construction began on the property, local concerns were again raised which eventually led to McAmis willingly selling the property to Chico State University, Research Foundation.

In 1998, CSU, Chico Research Foundation bought the 93-acre (380,000 m^{2}) parcel from McAmis with support from CSU's Office of Watershed Projects, and funds from National Fish and Wildlife Foundation, Wildlife Conservation Board, CALFED and US Fish and Wildlife Service.

== Butte Creek House Ecological Reserve ==
The Butte Creek House Ecological Reserve is located at the headwaters of Butte Creek. It is 110 acres (0.45 km^{2}) of wetland meadow and forest near the base of Snow Mountain. The site was purchased in 1986 to preserve and restore the area as a part of the Federal Energy Regulatory Commission (FERC) Project 803, the De Sable-Centerville Hydroelectric Project. This reserve is located near montane chaparral, a type of plant community that includes greenleaf and pinemat manzanitas (Arctostaphylos patula, A. nevadensis), bitter cherry (Prunus emarginata) and bush chinquapin (Chrysolepis sempervirens) that grow at elevations from 2,000 feet (610 m) up to 9,000 feet (2,700 m). Forested areas include pure stands of lodgepole pine (Pinus contorta) and red fir (Abies magnifica).

== Restoration ==
The restoration efforts of the Butte Creek watershed by environmental groups, together with private landowners and state and federal agencies is showing results. "The restoration there I think has clearly had a measurable response", said Rob Titus, a senior Department of Fish and Game environmental scientist.

The fish count of Chinook salmon in 1987 was 14. The number counted in 1998 was 20,000.

During the period 1994 through 1997, several agricultural structures were removed, fish screens were installed and a new fish ladder was also installed. In addition, a minimum streamflow rate of 40 cubic feet per second (1.1 m^{3}/s) is maintained from October 1 to June 30.

"The spring run in Butte Creek is doing exceptionally well. "For the fish, it's a success story...", according to the California Department of Fish and Game's Harry Morse.

Other restoration work has been the removal of invasive plant species including star thistle, scotch broom and Himalayan blackberry. Non-native plants can displace the native species, which may decrease biodiversity and cause a loss of habitat that provide nest sites and food sources. The riparian or streamside plant areas along Butte Creek are the most vulnerable to invasive non-native plants.

== See also ==
- California State Reserves
- List of California Department of Fish and Game protected areas
- Floods in the United States during the 1980s
