= Allensworth Ecological Reserve =

- Park
- Location within California Location within the United States
- Coordinates: 35°51′45″N 119°18′16″W
- Country: United States
- State: California
- County: Tulare
- Time zone: Pacific (PST)

Allensworth Ecological Reserve is a park in Tulare County, California.

The reserve is 5,100 acres and contains valley saltbush scrub and valley sink scrub habitats. The animals at the park include ground squirrels and coast horned lizards, while the plants at the park include iodine bush, goldenbush, Atriplex, and San Joaquin saltbush.

In 1983, the property was designated as an ecological reserve by the Fish and Game Commission. The land used to be made for farming, non-toxic waste disposal, grazing and subdivision for conceptual development.

The reserve may take part in a fox kit relocation effort.
