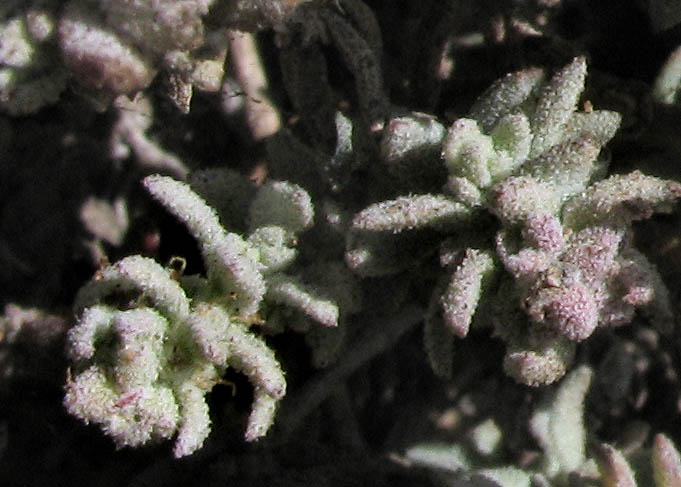

Scientific classification
- Kingdom: Plantae
- Clade: Tracheophytes
- Clade: Angiosperms
- Clade: Eudicots
- Order: Caryophyllales
- Family: Amaranthaceae
- Genus: Extriplex
- Species: E. californica

Binomial name
- Extriplex californica (Moq.) E.H.Zacharias

Synonyms
- Atriplex californica Moq.

= Extriplex californica =

Species of aquatic plant

Extriplex californica is a plant species known by the common name California saltbush or California orache. Formerly, it was included in genus Atriplex. It is native to coastal California and Baja California, where it grows in areas with saline soils, such as beaches and salt marshes.

== Description ==
Extriplex californica is a perennial herb growing from a fleshy caudex and taproot. Many stems spread to a maximum width of about 80 centimeters (32 in.) and 30 centimeters (12 in.) in height. The scaly gray-green leaves are lance-shaped to oval and less than 3 centimeters (1 in.) long.

The plant may be monoecious or dioecious, with some plants having both male and female flower types, and others having just one. Both types of inflorescence are rough clusters of tiny flowers.

== Systematics ==
The first publication of this taxon was in 1849 by Alfred Moquin-Tandon (in: De Candolle: Prodromus Systematis Naturalis Regni Vegetabilis 13(2): 98) as Atriplex californica Moq. In 2010, after phylogenetic research, Elizabeth H. Zacharias classified it in a new genus Extriplex, as Extriplex californica (Moq.) E.H.Zacharias.

Extriplex californica belongs to the tribe Atripliceae in the subfamily Chenopodioideae of Amaranthaceae.
