= Mystic Lake (California) =

Lake in California, United States

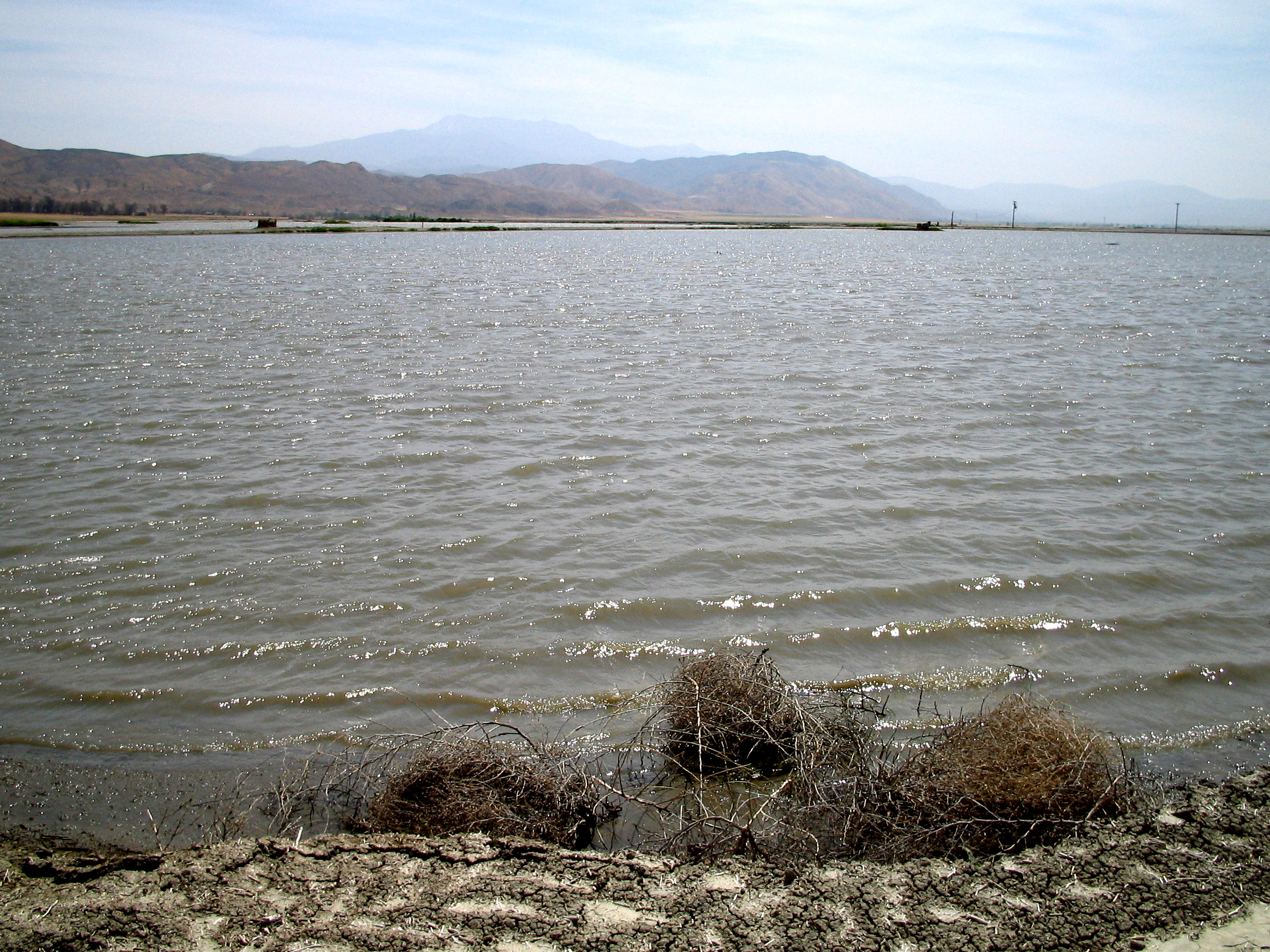

- Location within southern California Location within California Location within the United States
- Location: Riverside County, California
- Coordinates: 33°52′45″N 117°05′01″W
- Type: Seasonal
- Primary inflows: San Jacinto River
- Primary outflows: San Jacinto River
- Basin countries: United States

Mystic Lake is a seasonal lake in the San Jacinto Valley of western Riverside County, California. The lake's size can vary widely each year. The lake can persist from one year to the next, and at other times it completely dissipates during the dry season. The Mystic Lake area attracts one of the most diverse populations of birds in the United States, with over 200 species identified.

The lake is located east of the Lake Perris reservoir and the town of Lakeview, between the cities of Moreno Valley, to the north, and San Jacinto, to the south. The town of Lakeview received its name for its proximity to Mystic Lake.

== Description ==
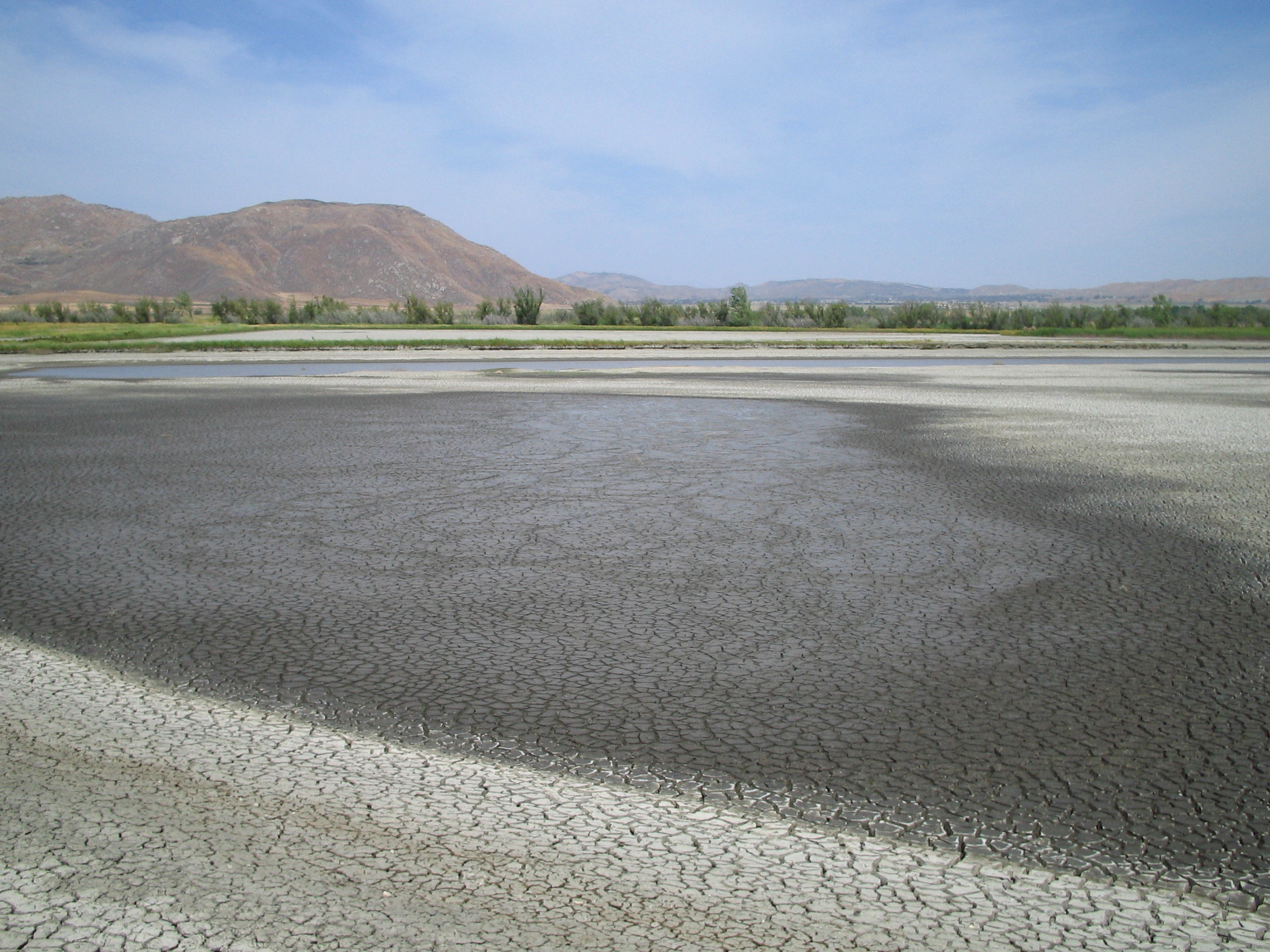
Mystic Lake receding during dry times

The lake persists from one year to the next, and at other times it completely dissipates during the dry season. The lake lies within the outlet area of the San Jacinto River and is typically full only during late winter and spring when the river is flowing. In recent years, the lake has decreased from thousands of acres to under 200 acres (0.81 km^{2}). If dry conditions persist, experts speculate that it will dry up altogether, becoming an ephemeral lake.

Because the San Jacinto basin is actively and rapidly subsiding (on a geologic time-scale), the USGS estimates that the potential size of the lake (the rapidly expanding closed depression) will continue to grow.

== San Jacinto Wildlife Area ==
The lake is adjacent to the 9,000-acre (3,600 ha) San Jacinto Wildlife Area, which is owned and managed by the California Department of Fish and Wildlife and open to the public. It features restored wetlands and wildlife habitat. Mystic Lake is a high priority acquisition area for the department to add to the Wildlife Area. It is a popular destination for bird-watchers and hunters. The developer of an 8,725-unit housing development is required to create an environmental stewardship program to provide community education and funding to the local agencies that manage the wildlife area to offset the impact of the development and its influx of residents.

== Juan Bautista de Anza Anza Trail ==
The Anza Trail passes by the lake, which was described by Juan Bautista de Anza in 1774 as "several leagues in circumference and as full of white geese as water." Anza named it Laguna de Bucareli, after Antonio María de Bucareli y Ursúa, the viceroy of New Spain. Much later, it became known as Mystic Lake.

== See also ==
- Juan Bautista de Anza National Historic Trail - National Park Service
- List of lakes in California
