= Eryngium constancei =

Conservation status
- Critically Imperiled (NatureServe)

Scientific classification
- Kingdom: Plantae
- Clade: Tracheophytes
- Clade: Angiosperms
- Clade: Eudicots
- Clade: Asterids
- Order: Apiales
- Family: Apiaceae
- Genus: Eryngium
- Species: E. constancei

Binomial name
- Eryngium constancei Y.Sheikh

Species of flowering plant in the celery family

Eryngium constancei is a species of flowering plant in the family Apiaceae known by the common name Loch Lomond button celery, or Loch Lomond coyote thistle. It is endemic to California, where it is known from only three occurrences north of the San Francisco Bay Area. One of the populations is at the Loch Lomond Vernal Pool Ecological Reserve at Loch Lomond in Lake County. The plant appears mainly in vernal pools. It is endangered on the state and federal levels.

== Description ==
This is a hairy, somewhat fleshy, perennial herb growing branching stems 20 to 30 centimeters (8 to 12 in) in height. Dark green, narrowly spade-shaped leaves grow on long petioles and may grow erect with the stems or lie flat along the ground. They may have smooth to toothed to sharply serrated edges.

Flower heads are less than a centimeter wide with a few longer, straight, sharp bracts around the base. The tiny flowers packed into the rounded head are generally white. This plant is threatened by destruction of its fragile vernal pool habitat by a number of causes, including sediment-rich runoff into the pools from logging activity, erosion, development, and off-road vehicles.
