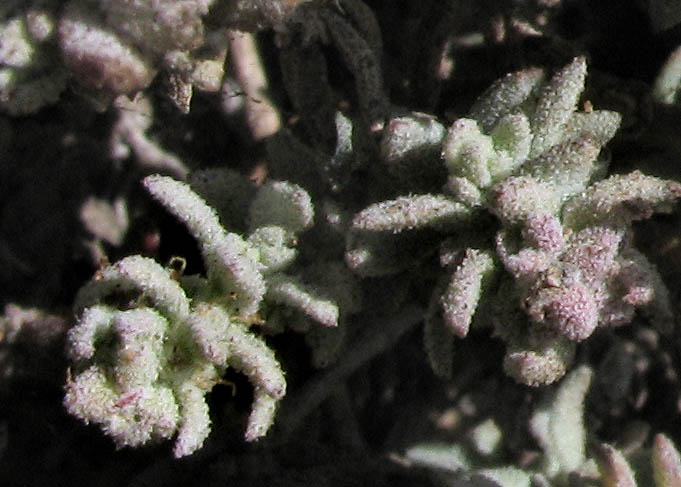
- Extriplex californica

Scientific classification
- Kingdom: Plantae
- Clade: Tracheophytes
- Clade: Angiosperms
- Clade: Eudicots
- Order: Caryophyllales
- Family: Amaranthaceae
- Subfamily: Chenopodioideae
- Tribe: Atripliceae
- Genus: Extriplex; E. H. Zacharias (2010)

Species
- Extriplex californica (Moq.) E.H.Zacharias; Extriplex joaquinana (A.Nelson) E.H.Zacharias

Synonyms
- Atriplex [unranked] Californicae Standl.; Atriplex subsect. Californicae (Standl.) S. L. Welsh; Phyllotheca Nutt. ex G.L.Chu & S.C.Sand. (2017), nom. superfl.

= Extriplex =

Genus of flowering plants

Extriplex is a plant genus in the subfamily Chenopodioideae of the family Amaranthaceae. It was described in 2010 and comprises two species, that were formerly included in genus Atriplex. They are restricted to the California Floristic Province.

== Description ==
The species of Extriplex are annuals or perennial herbs up to 1 m high, growing erect or spreading to decumbent. Young plant parts are farinose, older ones glabrescent or scurfy. The sparsely or much branched stems are striate when young, later stramineous. The green to grayish leaves are alternate, the lowest sometimes nearly opposite, petiolated or not. Their leaf blades are 4–70 mm long and 2–40 mm wide, deltoid to ovate-rhombic (to subhastate) or lanceolate to elliptic, with irregularly sinuate-dentate or entire margins. The leaf anatomy is of the "normal" (non-Kranz) type of C3-plants.

The plants are monoecious. The inflorescences stand axillary or form dense or interrupted spikes or panicles of male and/or female flowers at the tips of the branches. Male flowers (with a bracteole) consist of 4 rounded-triangular perianth lobes, ca. 1 mm long, with cucullate tips, and 4 non-exserting stamens inserting on a disc. Female flowers are sitting within 2 opposite bracteoles, without perianth, consisting just of an ovary with 2 filiform, exserted stigmas.

In fruit, the bracteoles enclosing the fruit become accrescent, 3–4.5 × 2–3 mm, free or connate to the lower half. Their shape can be ovate, nearly round, or deltate with entire margins and acute to acuminate apices. Their surface is densely scurfy, smooth or ribbed. The subglobose or laterally compressed fruit (utricle) is not spongy, and does not fall at maturity. The membranous pericarp is free or slightly adheres to the seed. The vertically orientated seed has a black to dark-brown, smooth and shiny, hard seed coat. The annular embryo surrounds the copious farinaceous perisperm.

The flowering time is April to November.

The chromosome numbers are n = 9 (haploid) and 2n = 18 (diploid).

== Distribution ==
The genus Extriplex occurs only in the California Floristic Province and in the coastal desert of Baja California. It is known from the Central Valley and the valleys of the inner coast ranges, and from slightly north of San Francisco to Cedros Island, Baja California, where is grows on sandy coasts, in shrubland and salt marshes.

The two species differ in their habitats: Extriplex californica can be found in monotypic stands in coastal habitats (like sea bluffs, sandy coasts, crevices in sea cliffs, coastal strands, coastal salt marsh, coastal sage scrub), often on sandy soils. Extriplex joaquinana grows in inland alkali sink scrub or in alkaline grasslands.

== Systematics ==
The genus Extriplex has been first described in 2010 by Elizabeth H. Zacharias (In: A Molecular Phylogeny of North American Atripliceae (Chenopodiaceae), with Implications for Floral and Photosynthetic Pathway Evolution. In: Systematic Botany 35 (4), p. 839-857). It was established to separate two species from genus Atriplex, that revealed to be phylogenetically distinct. The genus name was derived from the Latin prefix "ex" (= on the outside) plus the genus name Atriplex. The type species is Extriplex joaquinana.

Extriplex belongs to the tribe Atripliceae in the subfamily Chenopodioideae of the family Amaranthaceae.

The genus comprises two species:

- Extriplex californica (Moq.) E.H.Zacharias (Syn.: Atriplex californica Moq.) - California saltbush, California orach
- Extriplex joaquinana (A.Nelson) E.H.Zacharias (Syn.: Atriplex joaquinana A.Nelson) - San Joaquin saltbush, San Joaquin orach
