= Loch Lomond Vernal Pool Ecological Reserve =

Nature reserve in California, U.S.

- IUCN category Ia (strict nature reserve)
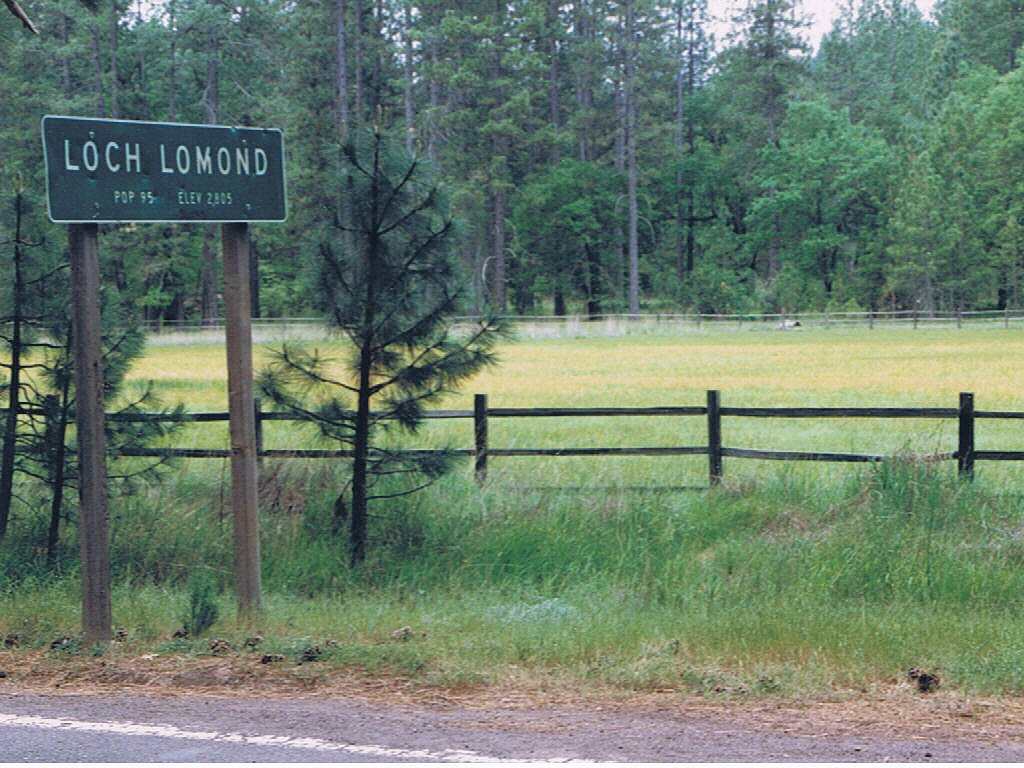
- Interactive map of Loch Lomond Vernal Pool; Ecological Reserve
- Location: Southern Lake County, California
- Nearest city: Lower Lake, California
- Coordinates: 38°51′56″N 122°43′12″W
- Area: 8 acres (32,000 m^{2})
- Established: 1988
- Governing body: California Department of Fish and Game

The Loch Lomond Vernal Pool Ecological Reserve is a nature reserve of 8.22 acres (33,300 m^{2}) in the community of Loch Lomond in Lake County, California. It is one of 119 ecological reserves managed by the California Department of Fish and Game (CDFG). The ecological reserve system was authorized by the state legislature in 1968 for the purpose of conservation and protection of rare plants, animals and habitats.

The vernal pool provides habitat for the rare and endangered Loch Lomond button celery (Eryngium constancei) (also called coyote-thistle and Constance's coyote-thistle). The button celery was first collected in the vernal pool in 1941, and not until the late 1990s was there another discovery at two other locations in Lake County and one location in Sonoma County.

The southern portion of Lake County is in the Mayacamas Mountains of the California Coast Ranges. Nearby Cobb Mountain (4,722 ft) is the highest peak. Although extensively logged in the past, this area still has Ponderosa pine, sugar pine, and Douglas fir, as well as black oak, with an underbrush of manzanita, ground rose, coffeeberry, and California lilac.

== Background ==
The Loch Lomond button celery was listed as endangered under the federal Endangered Species Act in 1985 as an emergency measure due to the threat of habitat destruction from proposed dredging and filling of the vernal pool. The land was purchased by the CDFG on March 28, 1988, for $46,000 with funds provided by the State Public Works Board and the California Wildlife Conservation Board. A post and rail fence was installed by CDGF to limit access.

Historically, the area was used as a recreation field for baseball games, horseback riding, ice-skating, volleyball and cycling and was adjacent to the Loch Lomond Lodge, a popular resort until destroyed by fire on August 14, 1967.

== Loch Lomond button celery ==
In 1941, Robert Hoover collected the first specimen of button celery, although the plant is named for botanist Lincoln Constance who, together with M.Yusuf Sheikh, collected samples from the vernal pool in 1973. Sheikh continued to search other areas for the button celery as part of his doctoral thesis, but found no other populations. In 1984, California state botanists also conducted a search for other populations with no success.

The emergency listing in the Federal Register by the US Fish and Wildlife Service (USFWS) occurred in August, 1985 (50 FR 31187) to prevent the possible extinction of the species. (At the time, the Reserve had the only known population. Since the 1990s, three more populations have been found.) The emergency listing expired on March 29, 1986, and a new proposed rule was submitted by USFWS on March 26 which included public notification and request for comments. A Final Rule was issued and the button celery was federally listed as Endangered on January 22, 1987.

The landowner was planning construction of a pool or lake at the site and excavation had already begun, so the disturbed area was graded and reseeded with button celery. Other threats included off-highway vehicles, people treading through the meadow, and illegal dumping.

During the rainy season, off-road vehicles are still a problem, and the Department of Fish and Game was surveying the property for installation of new fencing in 2009.

== Other rare plants ==
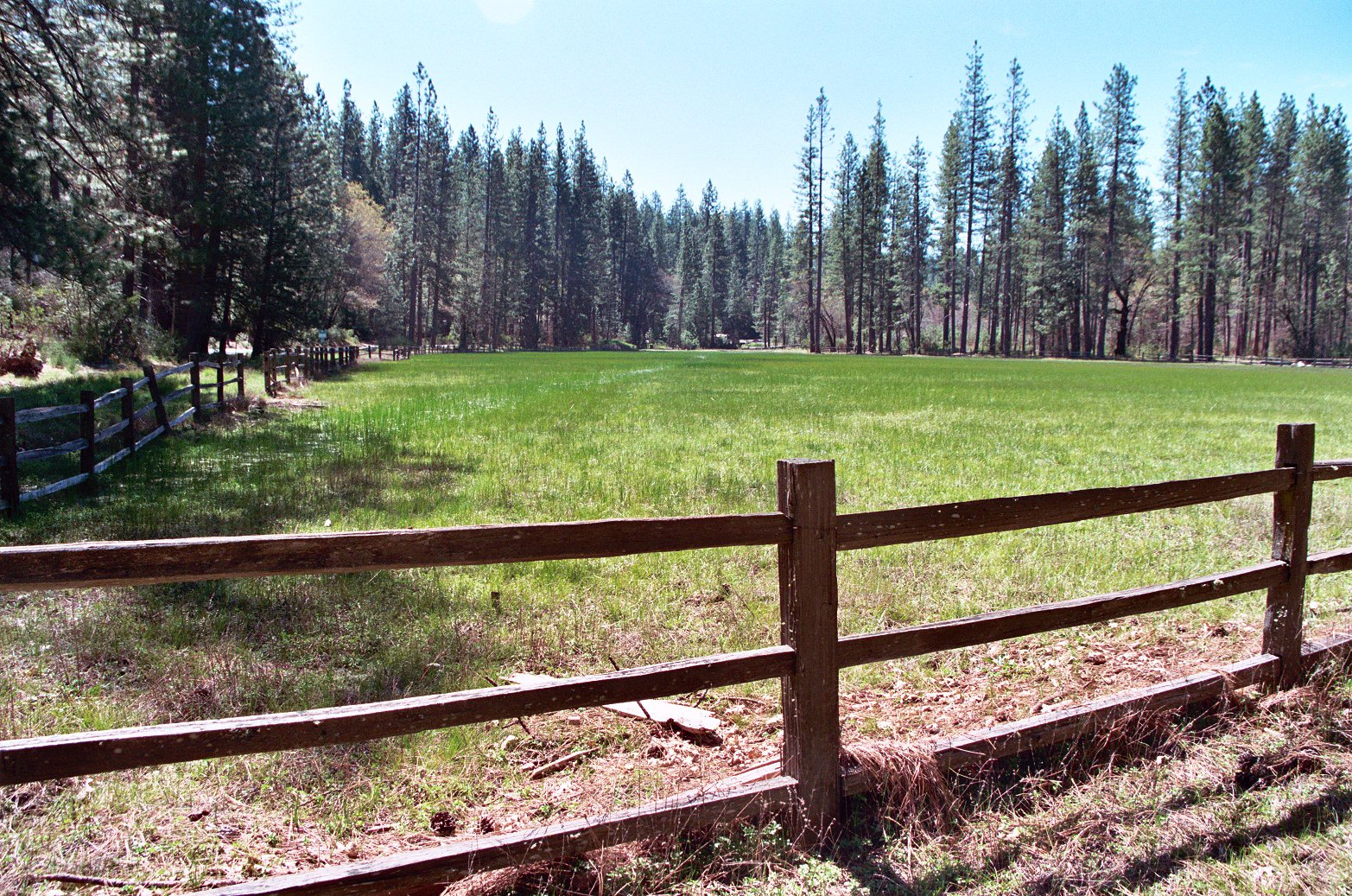
Vernal pool in the spring of 2008

- Many-flowered navarretia (Navarretia leucocephala ssp. plieantha)

The many-flowered navarretia is state (1979) and federal (1997) listed as endangered. It grows in wetland habitats near Ponderosa pine woodlands. An annual wildflower of the Phlox family (Polemoniaceae) that has only been found in the California counties of Lake, Sonoma and Napa. The plant form is a prostrate mat, flowers are clusters of white or blue with the bloom period in May through June. Identification is difficult as the many-flowered navarretia closely resembles the few-flowered navarretia and Baker's navarrettia and will hybridize with few-flowered navarretia.

- Few-flowered navarretia (Navarretia leucocephala ssp. pauciflora)

The few-flowered navarretia is state (1990) and federal (1997) listed as endangered. Very similar to many-flowered navarretia, differences include smaller white or blue flowers and the plant stems are white with purple streaks. The species account from US Fish and Wildlife Service, Sacramento reports that only Napa County has a population of few-flowered navarretia remaining. Historically, there were populations at the Loch Lomond reserve, Boggs Lake reserve, and in Sonoma County.

== See also ==
- List of California Department of Fish and Game protected areas
- Lincoln Constance-Guggenheim Fellowship award
