= Antelope Valley Wildlife Area =

Wildlife reserve in Loyalton, California

- Location within California
- Interactive map of Antelope Valley Wildlife Area
- Type: Protected area
- Location: Loyalton, California
- Coordinates: 39.6508°N 120.3105°W
- Area: 5,700 acres (8.9 sq mi)
- Established: c. 1980

The Antelope Valley Wildlife Area is a protected area located in Loyalton, California. It consists of approximately 5,700 acres (8.9 sq mi) of montane forests in the Great Basin. The Antelope Valley and Merry-Go-Round units are also included in this area.

== History ==
The valley that is included in the park has historically been used for livestock grazing and small-scale logging, being documented as early as 1922. In 1980, the land was purchased by the Wildlife Conservation Board to preserve the land, which was critical to the local deer herd. It was designated as a wildlife area by the California Department of Fish and Wildlife later that year.

== Geography ==
The park contains some of the channels which lead to the Middle Fork Feather River. Sagebrush dominates the terrain with rabbit brush and bitter brush occurring at lower elevations. It peaks with an elevation of 2,060 ft (630 m).

== Recreation ==
The Antelope Valley Wildlife Area offers many outdoor activities. Visitors can take part in hiking, camping, wildlife viewing, hunting, fishing, paddling, and golfing. Several species are commonly hunted in the Area, including rabbit, deer, wild turkey, doves, quail, squirrels, and grouse.
