= Alkali Sink Ecological Reserve =

Protected area in California, US

- IUCN category V (protected landscape/seascape)
- Location within California Location within the United States
- Location: Fresno County, California
- Nearest city: Mendota, California
- Coordinates: 36.72408°N 120.28373°W
- Governing body: California Department of Fish and Wildlife

The Alkali Sink Ecological Reserve is a protected conservation area spanning approximately 930 acres in the Central Valley of California. The reserve contains a variety of habitats, such as alkali sink scrub and annual grasslands, and serves as an essential refuge for numerous migratory birds, waterfowl, and endangered species. Established in 1979 by the Fish and Game Commission, the reserve aims to preserve the remaining Alkali Sink Scrub habitat, which has been largely extirpated due to agricultural expansion, urbanization, and infrastructure development.

== Habitats and vegetation ==
The Alkali Sink Ecological Reserve is characterized by its alkali sink communities, dominated by annual forb and grass vegetation, as well as salt basin and high marsh. Prominent plant species include alkali heath (Frankenia salina), iodinebush (Allenrolfea occidentalis), saltgrass (Distichlis spicata), and pickleweed (Salicornia virginica). These communities typically occur in areas with highly alkaline soils, which have been largely displaced from the Central Valley.

== Wildlife ==
The reserve provides critical habitat for several endangered species, such as the federally and state-endangered Fresno kangaroo rat (Dipodomys nitratoides exilis) and the palmate-bracted bird's-beak (Cordylanthus palmatus). The reserve is also an important area for migratory birds, including sandhill cranes, northern harriers, Swainson's hawks, mountain plovers, burrowing owls, and tricolored blackbirds. Additionally, raptors forage for rodents, rabbits, hares, small birds, and reptiles in the reserve.

=== Fresno kangaroo rat ===
The Fresno kangaroo rat, last captured within the boundaries of the reserve in 1992, has narrow habitat requirements and occupies alkali desert scrub communities between 200 and 300 feet (61 and 91 m) above mean sea level. The reserve serves as a crucial habitat for this endangered species.

=== Palmate-bracted bird's-beak ===
The palmate-bracted bird's-beak is known to exist in only eight localities, mostly in the Sacramento and Livermore valleys. The population within the Alkali Sink Ecological Reserve is considered critical to the species' recovery, as it incorporates unique genetic information not found elsewhere.

== Historical use and management ==
Prior to its acquisition as a reserve, the area was heavily grazed by livestock and managed as private waterfowl hunting clubs. However, there was minimal development of waterfowl hunting ponds, as members primarily hunted over flooded vernal pools.

== Relationship to adjacent areas ==
The Alkali Sink Ecological Reserve may provide suitable adjacent habitat for sensitive species located within the Mendota Wildlife Area (MWA). The reserve is not hydrologically connected to the Fresno Slough and is not directly impacted by the construction of the proposed groundwater recharge basin in the area.
