= Ash Creek Wildlife Area =

Wildlife area in California, United States

- IUCN category V (protected landscape/seascape)
- Location within California Location within the United States
- Location: Big Valley, California, United States
- Nearest city: Bieber, California
- Coordinates: 41°10′22″N 121°03′41″W
- Area: 14,400 acres (5,800 ha)
- Elevation: 4,157 ft (1,267 m)
- Established: 1986
- Governing body: California Department of Fish and Wildlife
- Website: Ash Creek Wildlife Area

Ash Creek Wildlife Area is a protected area managed by California Department of Fish and Wildlife. It is located in Lassen and Modoc Counties of northeastern California, about 5 miles (9 kilometers) northeast of Bieber. It was created in 1986 to provide habitats for local species.
