= Extriplex joaquinana =

Scientific classification
- Kingdom: Plantae
- Clade: Tracheophytes
- Clade: Angiosperms
- Clade: Eudicots
- Order: Caryophyllales
- Family: Amaranthaceae
- Genus: Extriplex
- Species: E. joaquinana

Binomial name
- Extriplex joaquinana (A.Nelson) E.H.Zacharias

Synonyms
- Atriplex joaquinana A.Nelson

Species of flowering plant

Extriplex joaquinana is a species known by the common name San Joaquin saltbush. It was formerly included in genus Atriplex.

== Distribution ==
It is endemic to California, where it grows in alkaline soils in the Sacramento-San Joaquin River Delta and adjacent parts of the Central Valley and eastern Central Coast Ranges.

== Description ==
This is an annual herb growing erect to a maximum height near one meter. The leaves are 1 to 7 centimeters in length, often scaly, green to gray-green in color, and oval to triangular in shape. The leaves are mostly located lower on the erect plant; those further up the stem are reduced in size. The inflorescences of male flowers are dense, heavy spikes, and the female flowers are held in smaller clusters.

== Systematics ==
The first publication of this taxon was in 1904 by Aven Nelson as Atriplex joaquinana A.Nelson (in: Proceedings of the Biological Society of Washington 17(12): 99). (It has sometimes been wrongly spelled Atriplex joaquiniana). In 2010, after phylogenetic research, Elizabeth H. Zacharias classified it in a new genus Extriplex, as Extriplex joaquinana (A.Nelson) E.H.Zacharias. Extriplex joaquinana belongs to the tribe Atripliceae in the subfamily Chenopodioideae of Amaranthaceae.
