= Spenceville Wildlife Area =

Wildlife preserve managed by the California Department of Fish and Wildlife

- IUCN category IV (habitat/species management area)
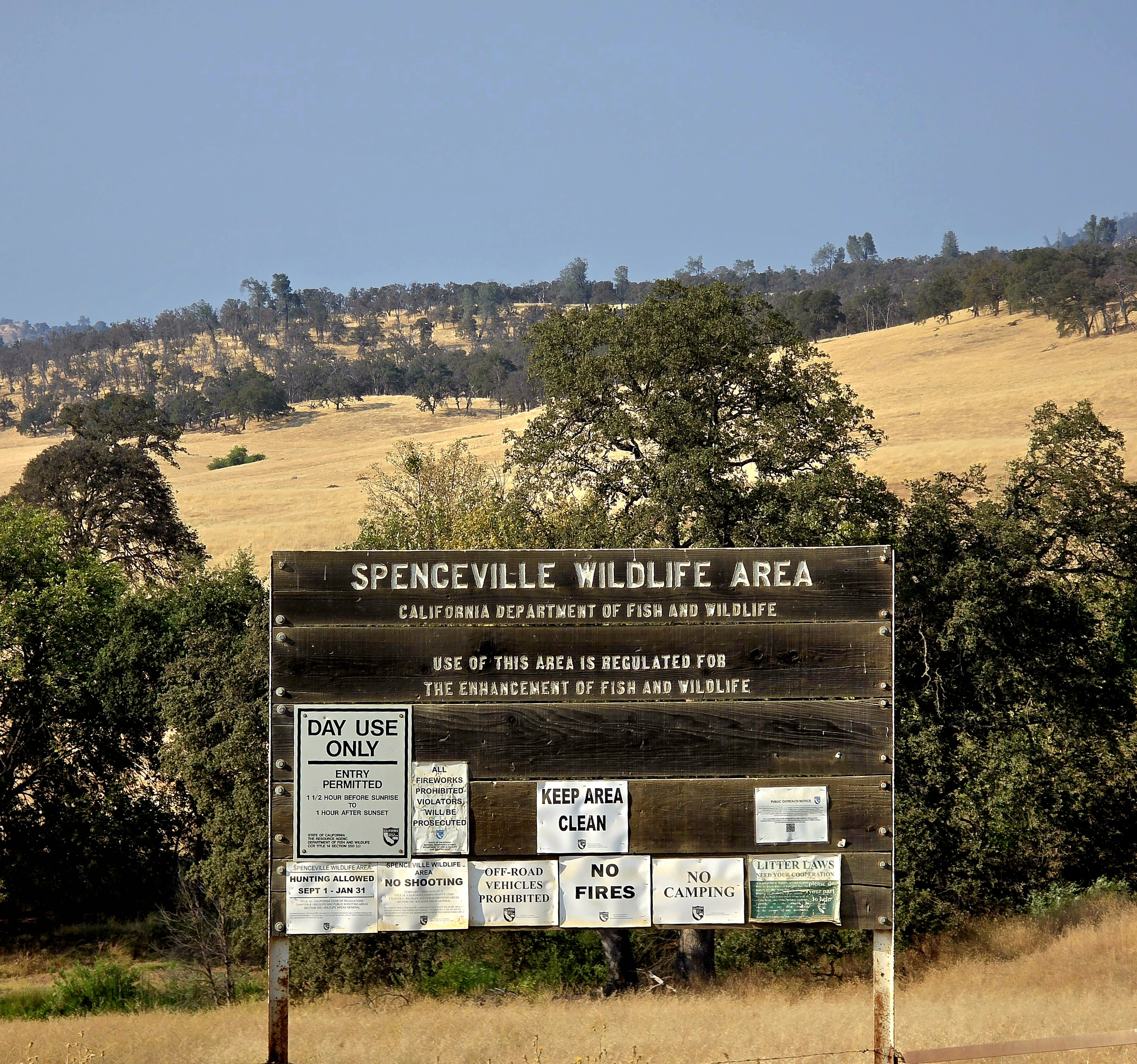
- Spenceville Wildlife Area sign
- Interactive map of Spenceville Wildlife Area
- Nearest city: Marysville, California
- Coordinates: 39°08′40″N 121°19′0″W
- Area: 11,448 acres (46.33 km^{2})
- Established: 1968
- Governing body: California Department of Fish and Wildlife

The Spenceville Wildlife Area is an 11,448-acre (46.33 km^{2}) wildlife preserve managed by the California Department of Fish and Wildlife. It is located in the Sierra Nevada Foothills, within Nevada County and Yuba County of northern California.

== History ==
The Spenceville Wildlife Area contains the site of the former town of Spenceville, California, a 19th century ranching, farming and copper mining community. Early settlers were ranchers and farmers; in the early 1860s copper ore was discovered on Purtyman’s Ranch and the Well Lead (Well Copper) Mine and surrounding ranch became the town of Spenceville. Copper mining expanded with the Last Chance Mine, and by the mid‑1870s the town had a post office, three general stores, a hotel, a school, a Methodist church and a Templar lodge, with about four hundred residents. Mining declined after World War I and Spenceville was abandoned; during World War II the U.S. military acquired much of the area for training. Following the war, part of the land became Beale Air Force Base and part became the Spenceville Wildlife Area; major cleanup of mine waste was completed in 2013.

In June 2025 the Nevada County Board of Supervisors designated Kneebone Ranch and Cemetery within the wildlife area as County Historical Landmark NEV 25‑06, recognizing the Kneebone family’s 20‑mule freight‑wagon business and burial site.

== Geography ==
The preserve is approximately 18 miles (29 km) east of the town of Marysville and Beale Air Force Base in the eastern Sacramento Valley. The elevation of the area varies from 200–1,200 feet (61–366 m).

== Natural history ==
Spenceville is a foothill oak woodland of Blue oak (Quercus douglasii) and Foothill gray pine (Pinus sabiniana), and a grassland habitat. It is notable for many species of native birds and wildflowers, including the California endemic Yellow mariposa lily (Calochortus luteus).

The geology of the Spenceville area is part of the Smartville Block formed during the Middle Jurassic epoch 200 million years ago. The Smartville Block is a part of the California Mother Lode for gold, and consequently Spenceville has had its share of mining activity. Cleanup from copper and zinc mining continues to this day.

The area was originally home to the Maidu and Nisenan Native Americans and evidence of their grinding holes and lodge pits still exist.

== Recreation ==
Spenceville hosts a variety of activities: hiking, biking, hunting, hunting dog field trials, target shooting, camping, equestrian trail riding, birding, and primitive camping. A popular trail leads to a double waterfall called Fairy Falls (a.k.a. Beale Falls, Shingle Falls, or Dry Creek Falls). There can be a high level of rattlesnakes seasonally.

== Conservation ==
The Spenceville Wildlife Area may be environmentally impacted by the Waldo Dam Project proposed by the Yuba County Water Agency, and by housing development proposed between Beale Air Force Base and the wildlife area.

== See also ==
- California oak woodlands
- Natural history of the California chaparral and woodlands
- Flora of the Sierra Nevada (United States)
