= Point Buchon State Marine Reserve and Marine Conservation Area =

Two adjoining marine protected areas

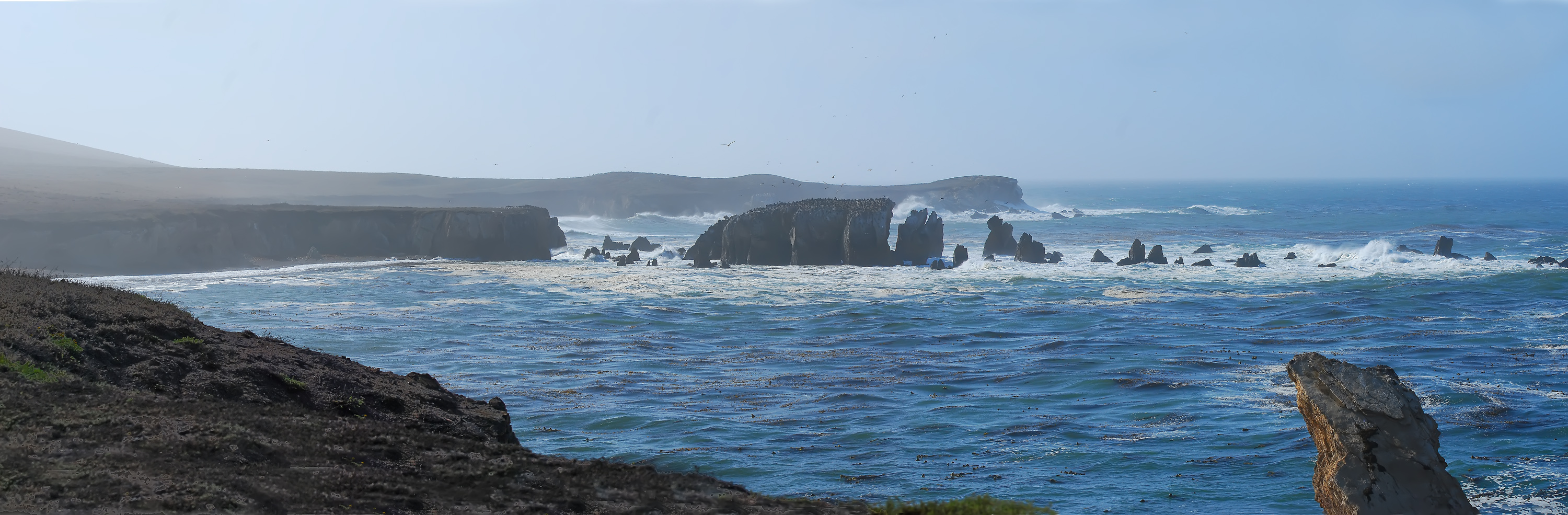
Reserve viewed from Point Buchon Trail

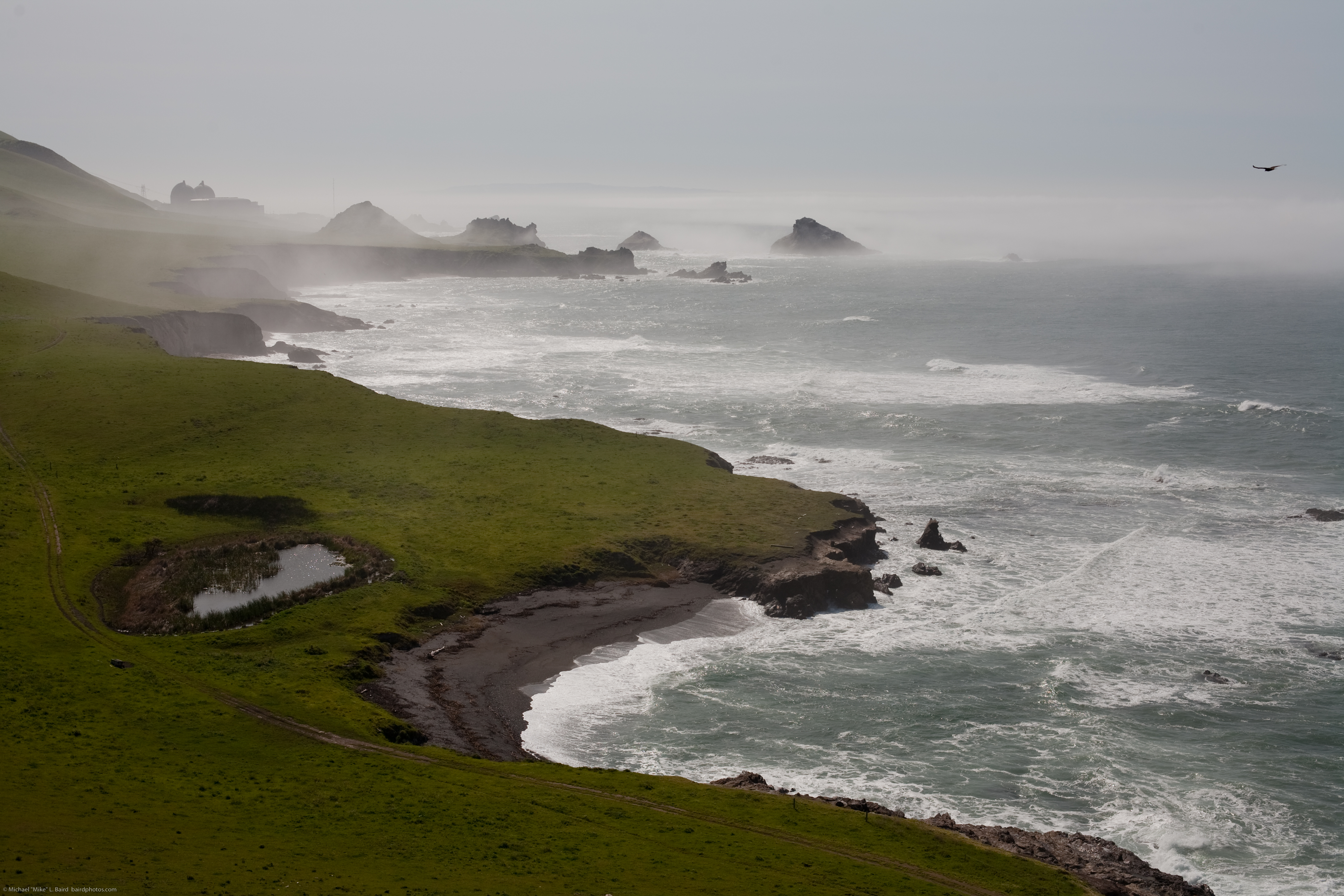
Another view from Point Buchon trail, Diablo Canyon Power Plant in background

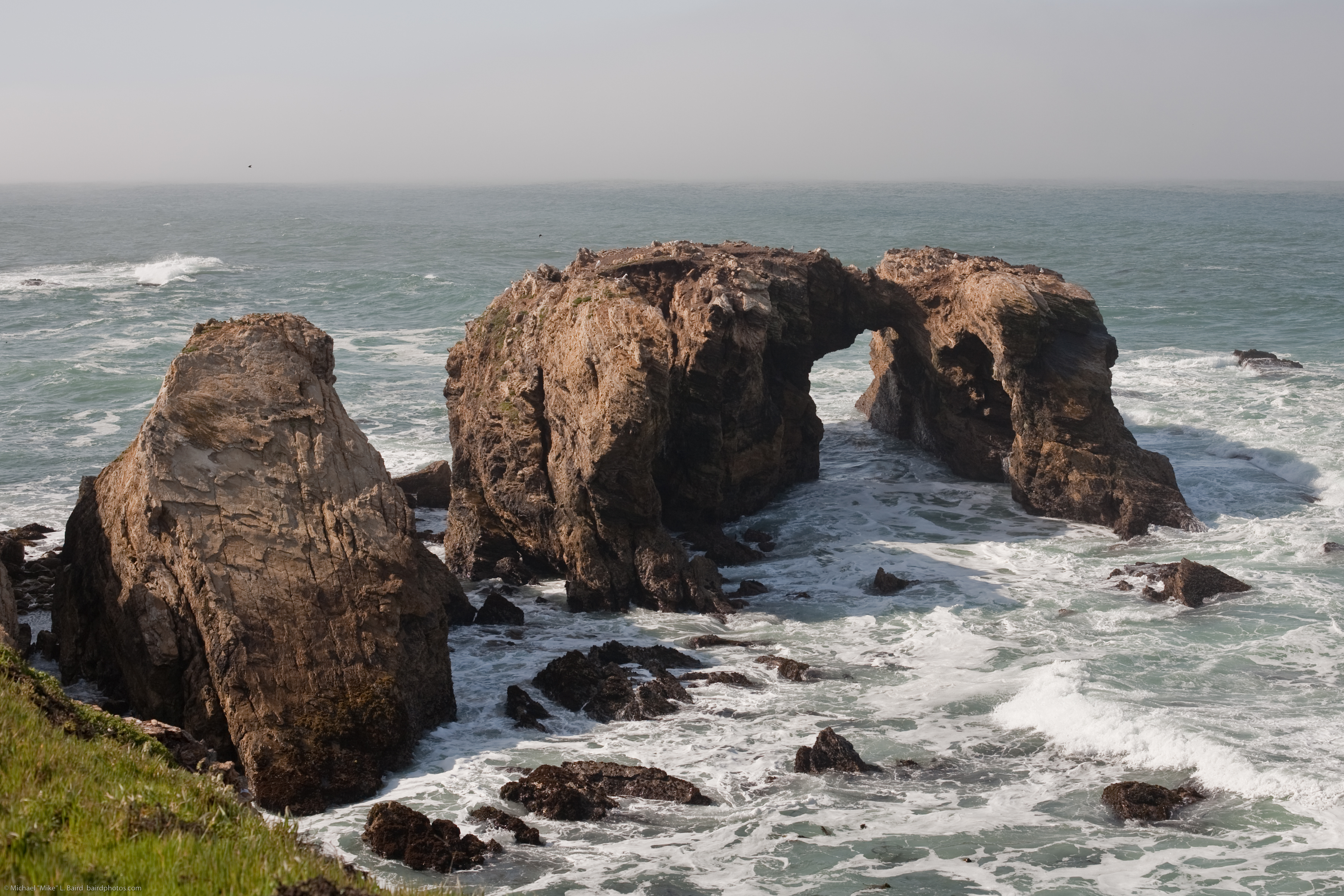
Arches and sea stacks of Miguelito shale, Point Buchon

Point Buchon State Marine Reserve (SMR) and Point Buchon State Marine Conservation Area (SMCA) are two adjoining marine protected areas that lie offshore Point Buchon in San Luis Obispo County on California's central coast. The combined area of these marine protected areas is 18.21 square miles (47.2 km^{2}). The SMR protects all marine life within its boundaries. Fishing and take of any living marine resources is prohibited. Within the SMCA fishing and take of all living marine resources is prohibited except the commercial and recreational take of salmon and albacore.

== History ==
Point Buchon SMR and Point Buchon SMCA were established in September 2007 by the California Department of Fish & Game. They are two of 29 marine protected areas adopted during the first phase of the Marine Life Protection Act Initiative. The Marine Life Protection Act Initiative (or MLPAI) is a collaborative public process to create a statewide network of marine protected areas along the California coastline.

Point Buchon was named after El Buchon, the Chumash chief who ruled the area when the Portola expedition passed this way in 1769. El Buchon had a large neck goiter, buchon in 18th century Spanish.

== Geography and natural features ==
These two marine protected areas adjoin each other off the coast of San Luis Obispo County.

The Point Buchon SMR is bounded by the mean high tide line and straight lines connecting the following points in the order listed:

35° 15.25' N. lat. 120° 54.00' W. long.;

35° 15.25' N. lat. 120° 56.00' W. long.;

35° 11.00' N. lat. 120° 52.40' W. long.; and

35° 13.30' N. lat. 120° 52.40' W. long.

The Point Buchon SMCA is bounded by straight lines connecting the following points in the order listed except where noted:

35° 15.25' N. lat. 120° 56.00' W. long.;

35° 15.25' N. lat. 120° 57.80' W. long.; thence southward along the three nautical mile offshore boundary to

35° 11.00' N. lat. 120° 55.20' W. long.;

35° 11.00' N. lat. 120° 52.40' W. long.; and

35° 15.25' N. lat. 120° 56.00' W. long.

== Habitat and wildlife ==
Point Buchon is an area with documented high diversity and abundance of fish and seabirds, remarkably clear water, underwater pinnacles, and some of the shallowest coldwater corals in the Central Coast. The exceptionally high quality habitats found at Point Buchon support diverse assemblages of nearshore and deep rocky reef fish species, as well as intertidal invertebrates, seabird colonies and marine mammals.

== Point Buchon trail ==
This 3.4 mile trail is on private land, owned by PG&E, and was opened to the public in 2007. Access is limited: see the PG&E trails website for details. Access is from the trailhead parking lot at the south end of Montana de Oro State Park.

== Recreation and nearby attractions ==
Nearby Montana de Oro State Park features hiking, biking and equestrian trails. In addition to a campground, there are primitive and equestrian campsites.

California's marine protected areas encourage recreational and educational uses of the ocean. Activities such as kayaking, diving, snorkeling, and swimming are allowed unless otherwise restricted.

== Scientific monitoring ==
As specified by the Marine Life Protection Act, select marine protected areas along California's central coast are being monitored by scientists to track their effectiveness and learn more about ocean health. Similar studies in marine protected areas located off of the Santa Barbara Channel Islands have already detected gradual improvements in fish size and number.

Local scientific and educational institutions involved in the monitoring include Stanford University's Hopkins Marine Station, University of California Santa Cruz, Moss Landing Marine Laboratories and Cal Poly San Luis Obispo. Research methods include hook-and-line sampling, intertidal and scuba diver surveys, and the use of Remote Operated Vehicle (ROV) submarines.
