= Collins Eddy Wildlife Area =

Wildlife area in California, United States

- IUCN category V (protected landscape/seascape)
- Location within California Location within the United States
- Location: Sutter County, California, United States
- Nearest city: Robbins, California
- Coordinates: 38°53′20″N 121°48′14″W
- Governing body: California Department of Fish and Wildlife

Collins Eddy Wildlife Area is a protected area managed by California Department of Fish and Wildlife. It is located in Sutter and Yolo Counties on the northern part of California, about 6 miles (9.7 kilometers) northwest of Robbins. Firearms and bows are not allowed in the area, and only water birds, coots, moorhens and Upland birds are allowed to be hunted.
