= Albany Mudflats Ecological Reserve =

Ecological reserve in San Francisco, California

- Map of Albany Mudflats Ecological Reserve

Ecology
- Biome: Tidal wetlands
- Animals: Shorebirds, Herons, Egrets

Geography
- Country: United States
- State: California
- Coordinates: 37.8930° N, 122.3120° W
- Climate type: Humid

Conservation
- Conservation status: Vulnerable

The Albany Mudflats Ecological Reserve is a 160-acre nature reserve in the San Francisco East Bay in Albany, California. It encompasses the Albany Mudflats State Marine Park and belongs to the greater McLaughlin Eastshore State Park.

== History ==
The property was leased to the California Department of Fish and Wildlife (CDFW) from the California State Lands Commission in 1982, as a means to preserve local endangered marine wildlife. Four years later, the Fish and Game Commission designated the territory as an ecological reserve.

The mudflats were incorporated into the Albany Beach restoration project that began in 2011 to remove pollution and reinstate endemic flora and fauna. The region is currently under the control of the East Bay Regional Park District (EBRPD). A legal description of the boundaries of each ecological reserve is on file at the department's headquarters (1416 Ninth Street, Sacramento).

== Wildlife ==
The reserve is home to a range of biodiversity. Particularly during the winter, the Albany Mudflats are inhabited by shorebirds, many of them migratory, like the Western Sandpiper, Marbled Godwit, and Semipalmated Plover. Egrets, ducks, and geese are commonly seen in the region, as well as land birds, such as sparrows, swallows, and the California Towhee.

Shorebirds acquire a large proportion of their nutrients from intertidal zones and mudflats. Thus, there have been ongoing efforts to restore and protect species endemic to the Albany Mudflats, such as eelgrass and native oysters, to support the shorebirds and prevent erosion.

== Regulations ==
As a subregion of the Albany Mudflats Ecological Reserve, the Albany Mudflats State Marine Park is demarcated by the average height of the water at high tide. Due to its distinction as a state park, visitors are not permitted to enter the water in any capacity. However, fishing and hiking along the shoreline are permitted. These restrictions of public entry have been imposed because ecological reserves intend to protect terrestrial and aquatic organisms from pollution and disturbances that may increase their susceptibility to extirpation or extinction.

The ecosystems fostered in the Albany Mudflats are prioritized. Restoration efforts such as the Albany Beach Habitat Restoration and Public Access Project aim to preserve and improve beach and dune habitat, as well as expand public access.
