= Anacapa State Marine Conservation Area =

Coordinates: 34.0042°N 119.3997°W

Anacapa Island State Marine Conservation Area
MPA Size:	7.30 square miles
Shoreline Span:	2.2 miles
Depth Range:	0–490 ft.
Habitat Composition:	Rock: 0.14 square miles Sand/Mud: 6.8 square miles

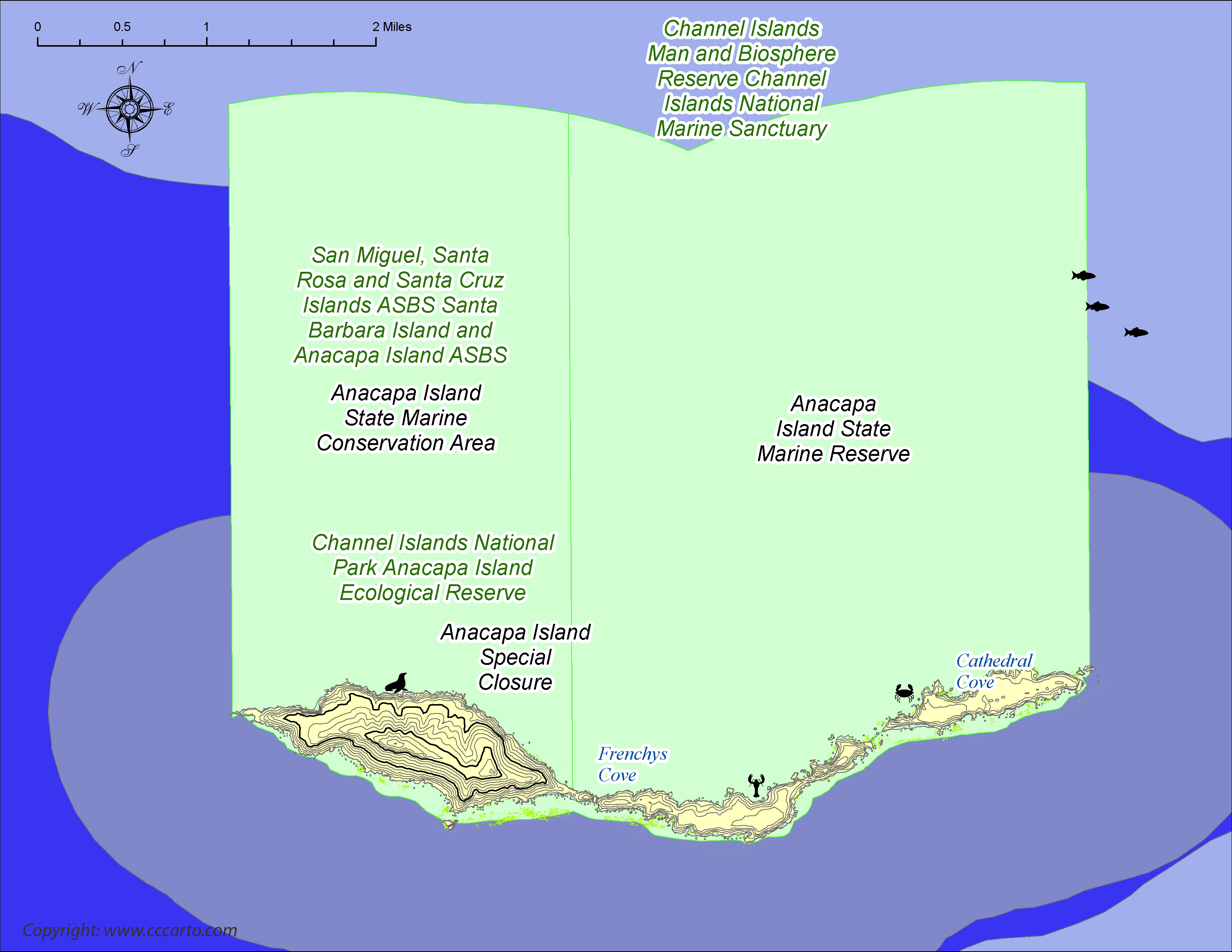

Anacapa State Marine Conservation Area was established in 2003. It was established as one of thirteen Channel Islands Marine Protected Areas in 2003, and "re-established as part of the statewide MPA Network in 2012." It shares a border on its northern side with the Federal Anacapa Island Marine Conservation Area. On its eastern side it shares a border with the Anacapa Island State Marine Reserve.

== Amenities ==
Anacapa Island has no food, water, services, or accommodations on the island. All amenities would have to be brought by the visitor. There is no fishing permitted in the marine reserve. The only visitor center on the island can be found in "one of the historic Coast Guard buildings."

== Wildlife ==
Wildlife that can be found on or around the island include, but is not limited to: cormorants, pigeon guillemots, western gulls, brown pelicans, seals, and sea lions.

== Recreation ==
Recreational activities that can be found on the island include: Diving, Wreck Diving, Snorkeling, Wildlife Tours, Kayaking, Bird Watching, and Hiking.
