= Pyramid Point State Marine Conservation Area =

Marine protected area on California's coast

Coordinates: 41°58′40″N 124°13′40″W

- Interactive map of Pyramid Point State Marine Conservation Area
- Location: Del Norte County, California
- Designation: State Marine Conservation Area
- Authorized: June 2012
- Created: December 19, 2012
- Governing body: California Fish and Game Commission

Pyramid Point State Marine Conservation Area is an offshore marine protected area located one mile south of the Oregon border in Del Norte County, California.

This area protects ocean waters within three miles of the shoreline of the Oregon border, south to roughly three-tenths of a mile north of Prince Island. Within Pyramid Point, fishing and take of all living marine resources is prohibited except for the recreational take of surf smelt by dip net or Hawaiian type throw net.

== History ==
In June 2012, the California Fish and Game Commission voted unanimously 3-to-0 to designate waters in Pyramid Point, along with critical ocean habits in northern California, as Marine Protected Areas. The vote marked the completion of the United States' first state network of underwater parks, protecting California coastal areas and important wildlife and habitats, which help the state's tourism industry, hotels and restaurant that depend on healthy fish populations and beautiful coasts to attract guests. According to the National Ocean Economics Program, California's coast and ocean generate $22 billion in revenue and sustain 350,000 jobs each year. The Pyramid Point Marine Conservation Area will be implemented on December 19, 2012, according to the California Department of Fish and Game.

== Geography ==
The California Department of Fish and Game said future marine protected area “is bounded by straight lines connecting the following points in the order listed: 42° 00.000' N. lat. 124° 12.735' W. long.; 42° 00.000' N. lat. 124° 19.814' W. long.; thence southward along the three nautical mile offshore boundary to 41° 57.500' N. lat. 124° 17.101' W. long.; and 41° 57.500' N. lat. 124° 12.423' W. long.

== Habitat and wildlife ==
Pyramid Point will support Aleutian cackling geese and other breeding birds, including some of California's only breeding fork-tailed storm petrels and tufted puffin. The area is also home to breeding grounds for great blue heron, the black-crowned night-heron and the farthest north group of snowy egret in the western United States. In addition, the area provides feeding ground for sea lions, dolphins and other large sea animals, and shelter for nearshore rockfish.

== Recreation and nearby attractions ==
Pyramid Point is connected to the Pelican State Beach, which is undeveloped and is immediately south of the Oregon border. Kite flying, shore angling and beach combing are popular activities at the park.
