= San Jacinto Wildlife Area =

Wildlife preserve in California, US

- IUCN category V (protected landscape/seascape)
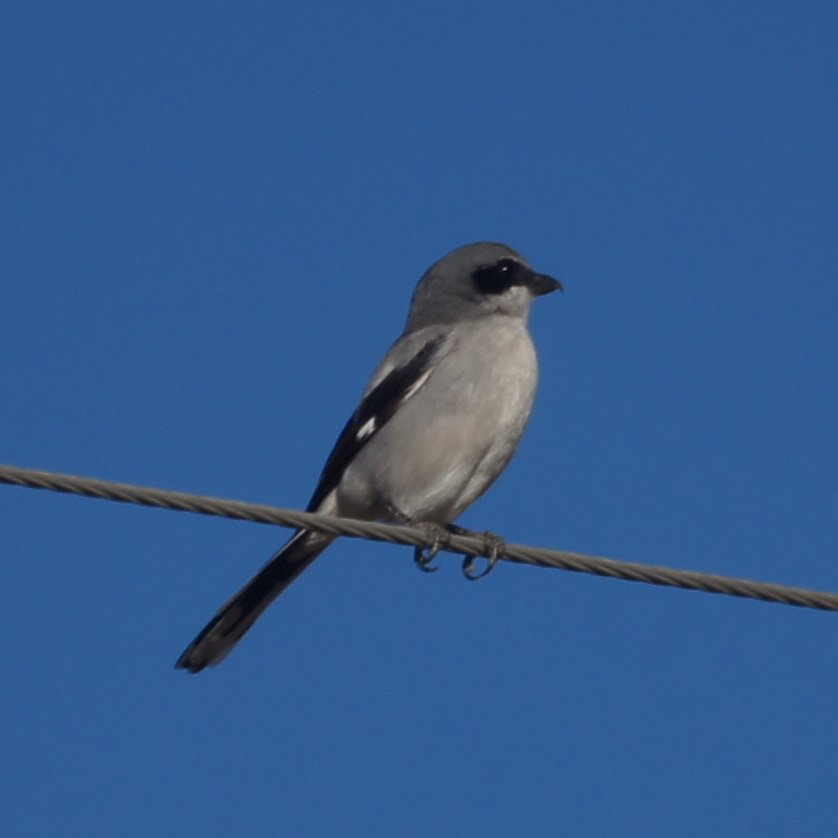
- Loggerhead shrike at San Jacinto WA, 2012

- Location within California Location within the United States
- Nearest city: Perris, California
- Coordinates: 33.8705°N 117.121°W
- Area: 20,126 acres (8,145 ha; 31.447 mi^{2})
- Established: 1982
- Governing body: California Department of Fish and Wildlife

The San Jacinto Wildlife Area (WA) is a 20,126-acre (8,145 ha; 31.447 mi^{2}) wildlife preserve in the Inland Empire region of California in the United States managed by the California Department of Fish and Wildlife. San Jacinto WA is made of up two discontinuous areas, one east of California State Route 79 called the Potrero Unit, and one between Gilman Springs Road (near the base of the San Jacinto Mountains) and Lake Perris State Recreation Area (which includes Mystic Lake). San Jacinto WA is part of an Audubon Society-designated Important Bird Area (IBA) of Global Concern. Over 300 species of birds have been observed at San Jacinto WA.

The Wildlife Area includes a constructed freshwater marsh that filters reclaimed water. Duck hunting (with a hunting license) has been permitted at San Jacinto annually since about 1993.

== See also ==
- Santa Rosa and San Jacinto Mountains National Monument
- San Timoteo Canyon
