= Filly =

Young female horse

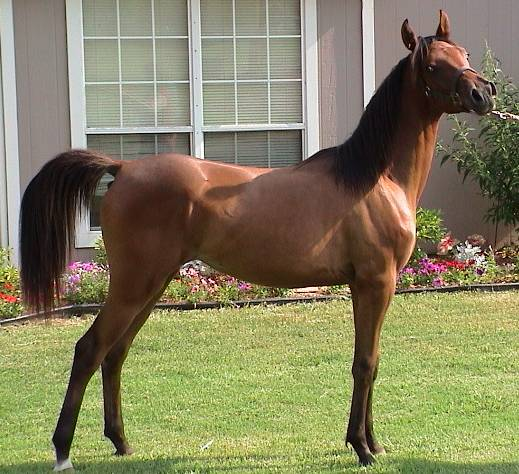
A yearling Arabian filly

A filly is a female horse that is too young to be called a mare. In most cases, a filly is a female horse under four years old. In some nations, such as the United Kingdom and the United States, the world of horse racing sets the cutoff age for fillies as five years old. Fillies are sexually mature by two and are sometimes bred at that age, but generally, they should not be bred until they themselves have stopped growing, usually by four or five. The equivalent term for a male is a colt. When horses of either sex are less than one year, they are referred to as foals.

== See also ==
- Filly Triple Crown
- Weanling
