= Piedras Blancas Light Station =

Lighthouse in California, United States

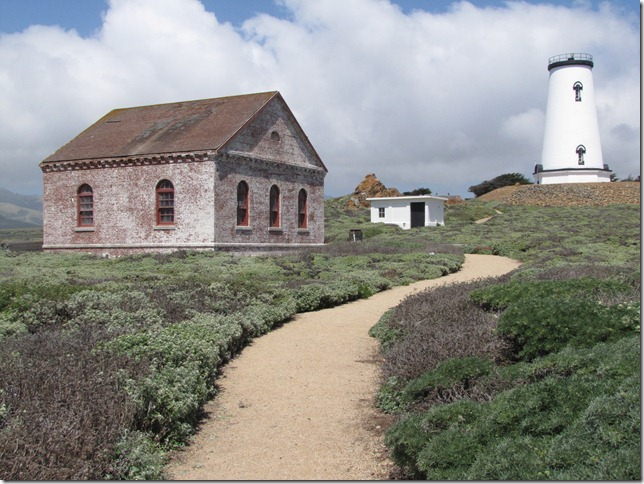
- Location: Point Piedras Blancas; San Simeon; California; United States
- Coordinates: 35°39′56.3″N 121°17′03.6″W

Tower
- Constructed: 1875
- Foundation: masonry basement
- Construction: brick tower
- Automated: 1975
- Height: 70 feet (21 m)
- Shape: conical tower
- Markings: white tower, black trim
- Heritage: National Register of Historic Places listed place

Light
- Focal height: 142 feet (43 m)
- Lens: First order Fresnel lens made by Henri Lapaute (original), VRB-25 (current)
- Range: 21 nmi (39 km; 24 mi)
- Characteristic: Fl W 10s.
- Piedras Blancas Light Station
- U.S. National Register of Historic Places
- U.S. Historic district
- Nearest city: San Simeon, California
- Area: 20 acres (8.1 ha)
- Architectural style: Classical Revival, Gothic, Romanesque
- MPS: Light Stations of California MPS
- NRHP reference No.: 91001095
- Added to NRHP: September 03, 1991

Piedras Blancas Light Station is located at Point Piedras Blancas, about 5.5 miles (9 km) west by northwest of San Simeon, California. It was added to the California Coastal National Monument in 2017.

== History and management ==
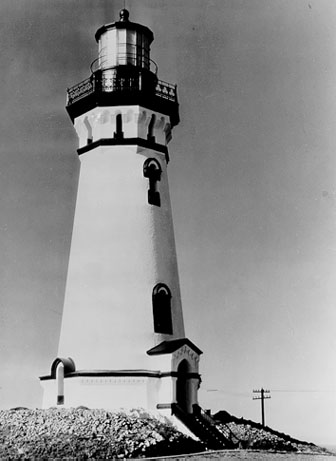
Piedras Blancas lighthouse (circa 1930) prior to removal of upper three levels.

The first-order Fresnel lens at Piedras Blancas was first illuminated on February 15, 1875. The Piedras Blancas lighthouse was originally 100 feet (30 m) high to the top of the ventilator ball, but earthquakes damaged the structure over the years. On December 31, 1948, final damage from an earthquake centered 6 miles (9.7 km) off the point led to the decision to remove the upper three floors: the fourth landing, watch room, and lantern. Missing the ornate upper floors, the truncated lighthouse now stands about 70 feet (20 m) tall. The lens was moved and is on display in the nearby community of Cambria.

A sound signal was added in 1906.

In 1939, management was transferred from the United States Lighthouse Service to the United States Coast Guard. In 1975, the light was automated, the sound signal removed, and the light station was unmanned. A group of biologists with the U.S. Fish and Wildlife Service received permission to establish a biological research station in 1977. In 2001, the Bureau of Land Management (BLM) assumed management of the site and was tasked to offer structured public access, allow site-specific research to continue, and restore the light station to its period of greatest historical significance (1875 to 1940). The Piedras Blancas Light Station Association is a non-profit partner of the BLM, helping to raise funds for restoration and maintenance.

The lighthouse continues to serve as an aid to navigation. A Vega VRB-25 produces a flash every 10 seconds. The light station is managed as a historic park and wildlife sanctuary.

The Piedras Blancas Historic Light Station was designated as an Outstanding Natural Area in 2008.

== Access ==
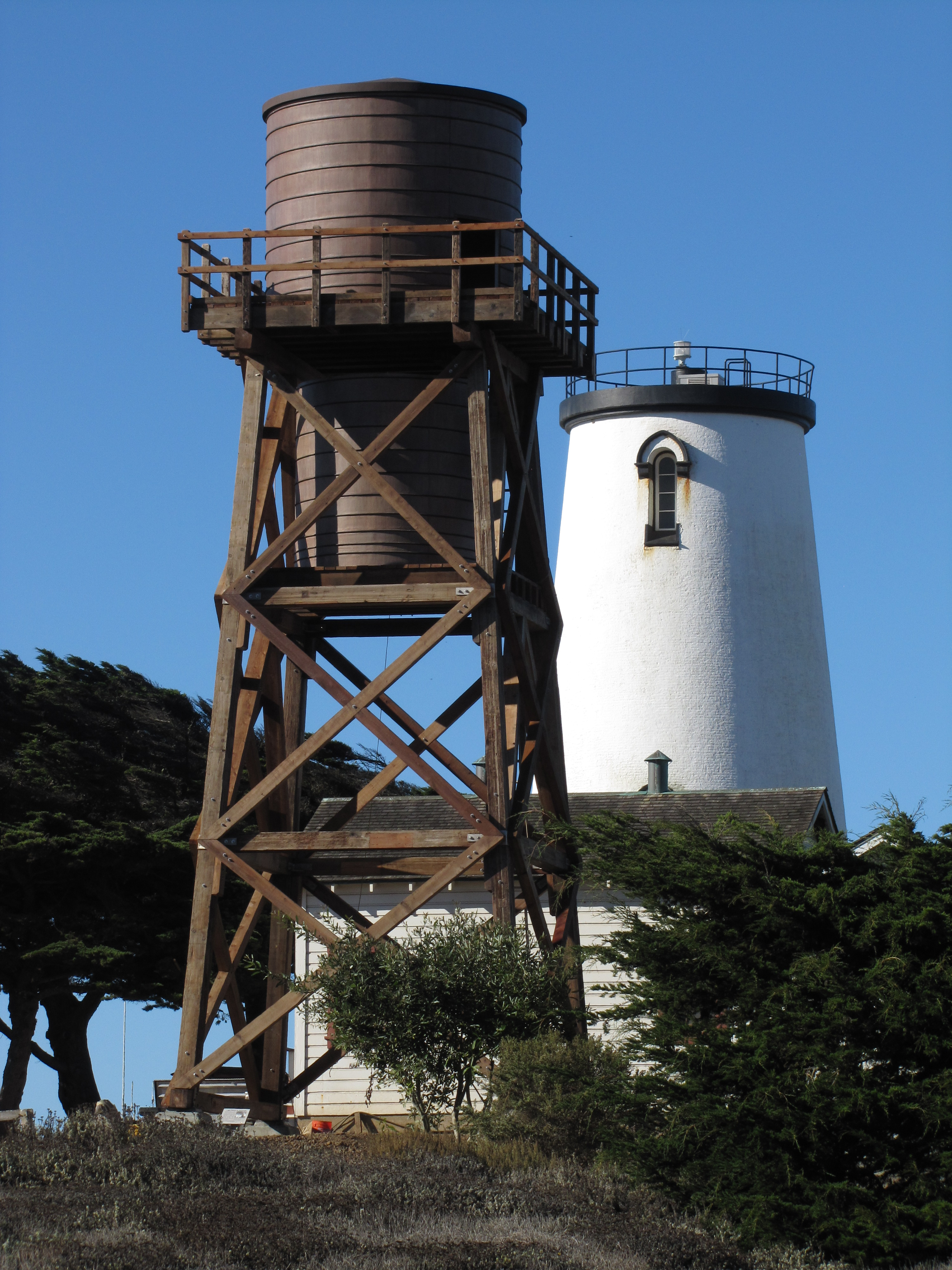
In 2013, a replica 50 foot water tower was completed to hold public safety communications equipment.

Access to the 19-acre (7.7 ha) site is by guided tours. The tour lasts two hours and includes the historic lighthouse and support buildings, wildlife viewing, and spectacular scenery along an easy half-mile interpretive trail.

== Elephant seal rookery and marine protected areas ==
The largest elephant seal rookery on the West Coast is located about a mile south of the lighthouse along California Highway One. A few animals began using the rookery in 1990. A large parking area and boardwalk offer easy access to view the elephant seals. Docents from Friends of the Elephant Seal provide insight as to what the visitor is viewing. Open year-round.

Piedras Blancas State Marine Reserve and Marine Conservation Area are marine protected areas offshore from Piedras Blancas Light Station. Like underwater parks, these marine protected areas help conserve ocean wildlife and marine ecosystems.

== In popular culture ==
The 1959 movie The Monster of Piedras Blancas was not shot at Point Piedras Blancas. The lighthouse locations in the movie were filmed at the Point Conception Light lighthouse near Lompoc, and the town is the seaside town of Cayucos, about 30 miles south of Piedras Blancas.

== Gallery ==
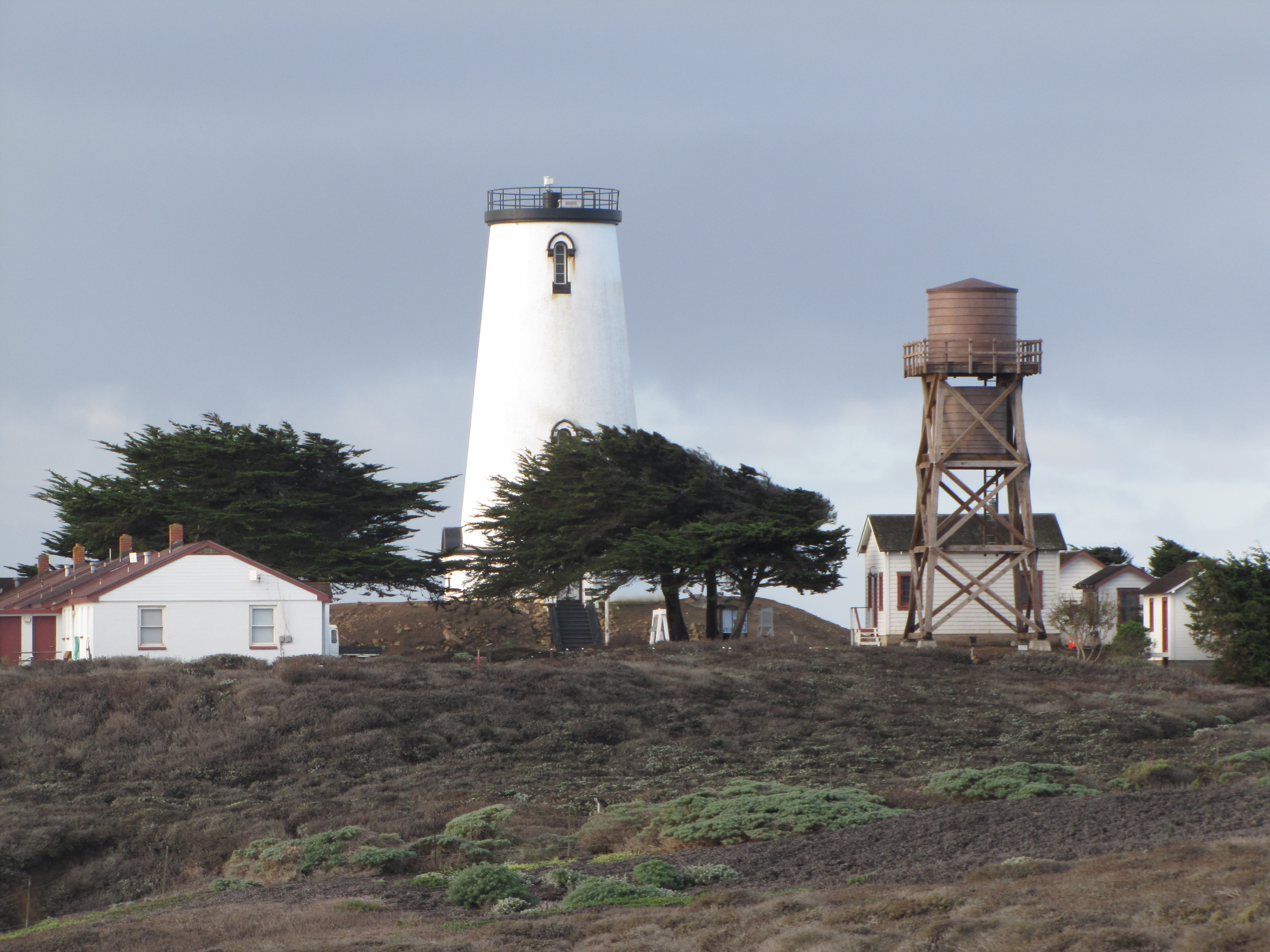
Piedras Blancas, 2014.

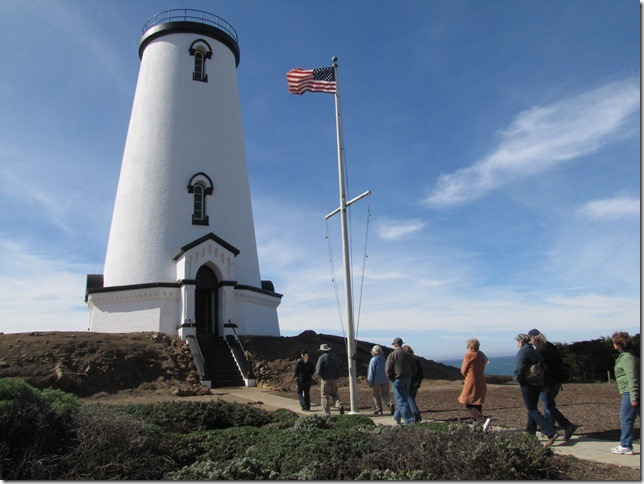
Tours of the Piedras Blancas Light Station are offered regularly.

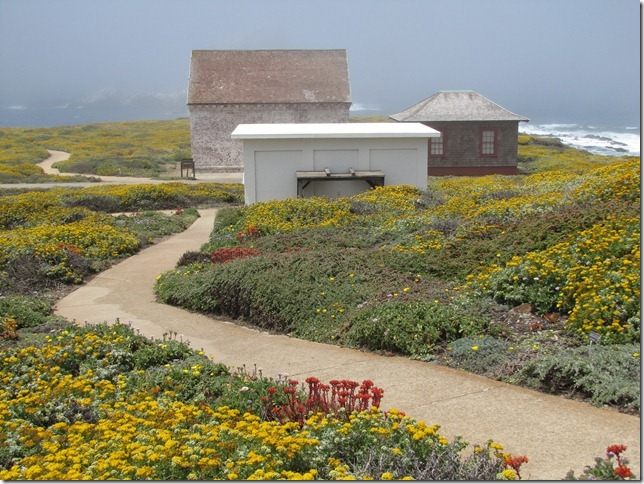
Native plants ablaze with color in early summer.

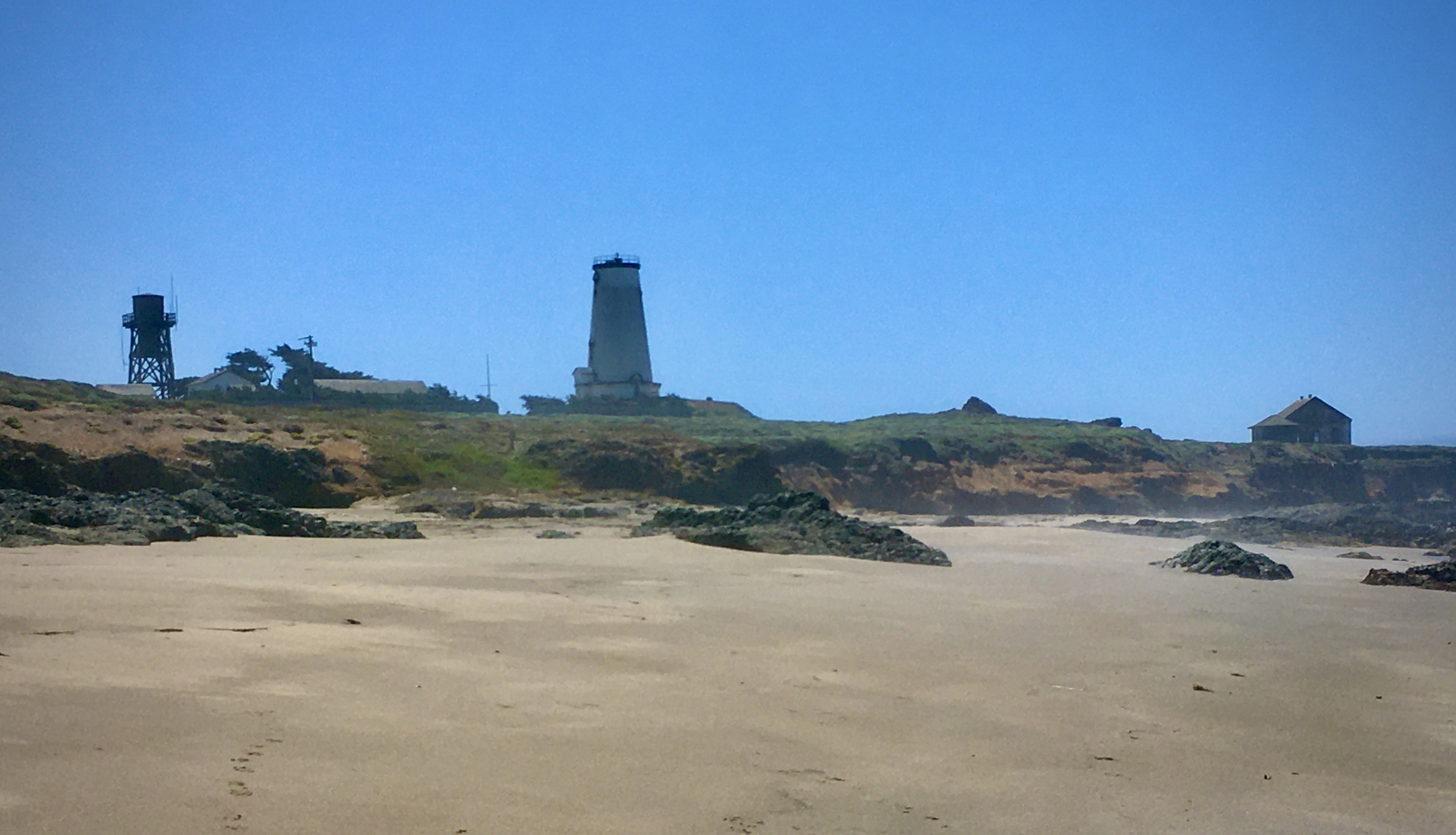
Piedras Blancas Light Station viewed from the beach below, May 2020

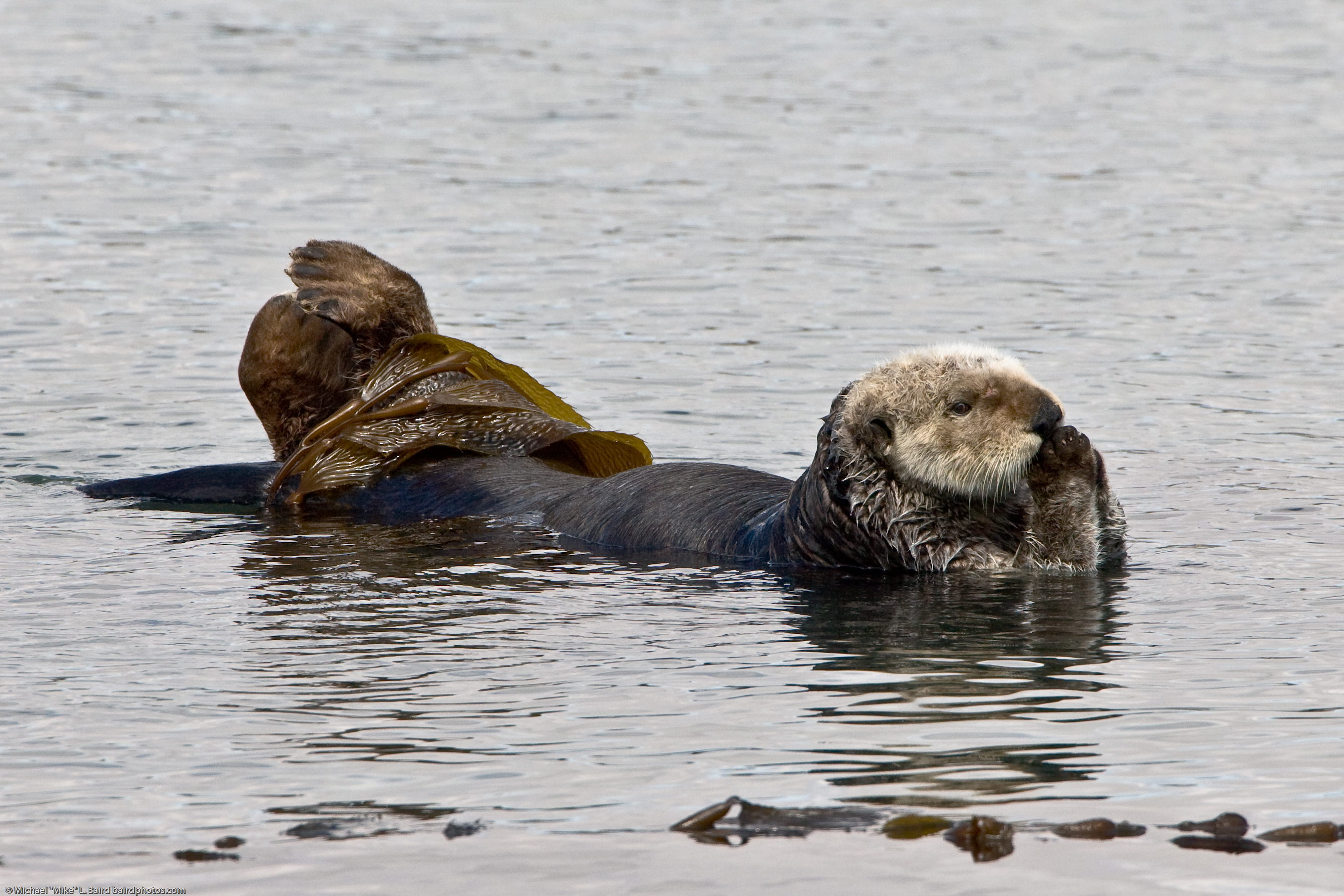
Sea otters rest and feed in the waters surrounding Piedras Blancas.
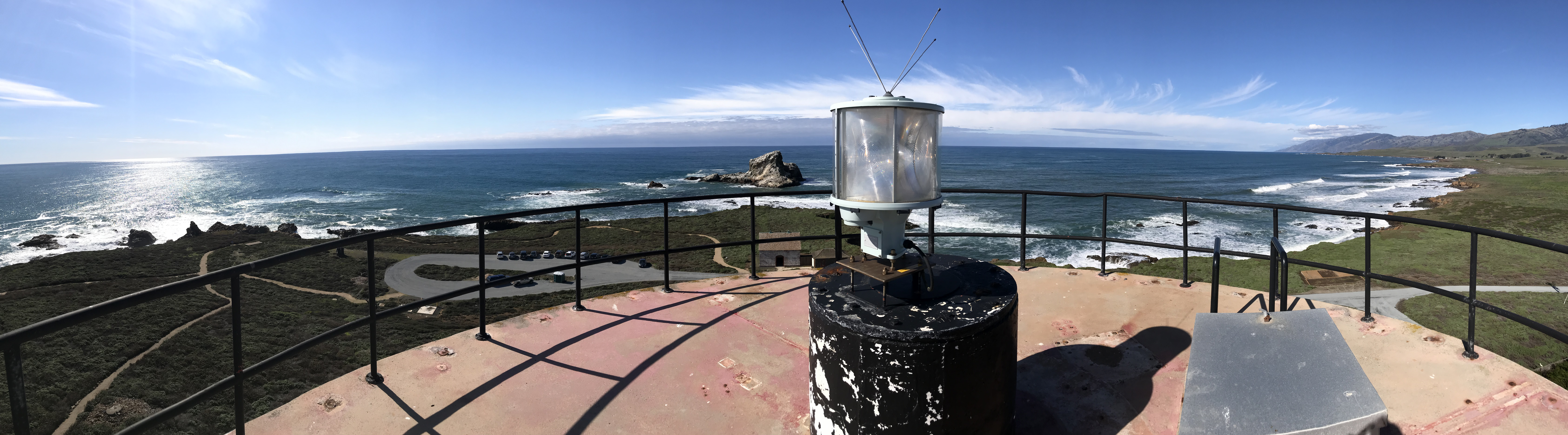
Panoramic view from the top of the lighthouse, 2019. The lighthouse lost its original top in a major earthquake in 1948.

== See also ==
- List of lighthouses in the United States
- Rancho Piedra Blanca, old Mexican land grant that included Point Piedras Blancas
- Piedras Blancas Motel, vintage roadside motel near the lighthouse
