= Piedras Blancas State Marine Reserve and Marine Conservation Area =

Marine protected areas in California

Coordinates: 35°41′05″N 121°19′35″W

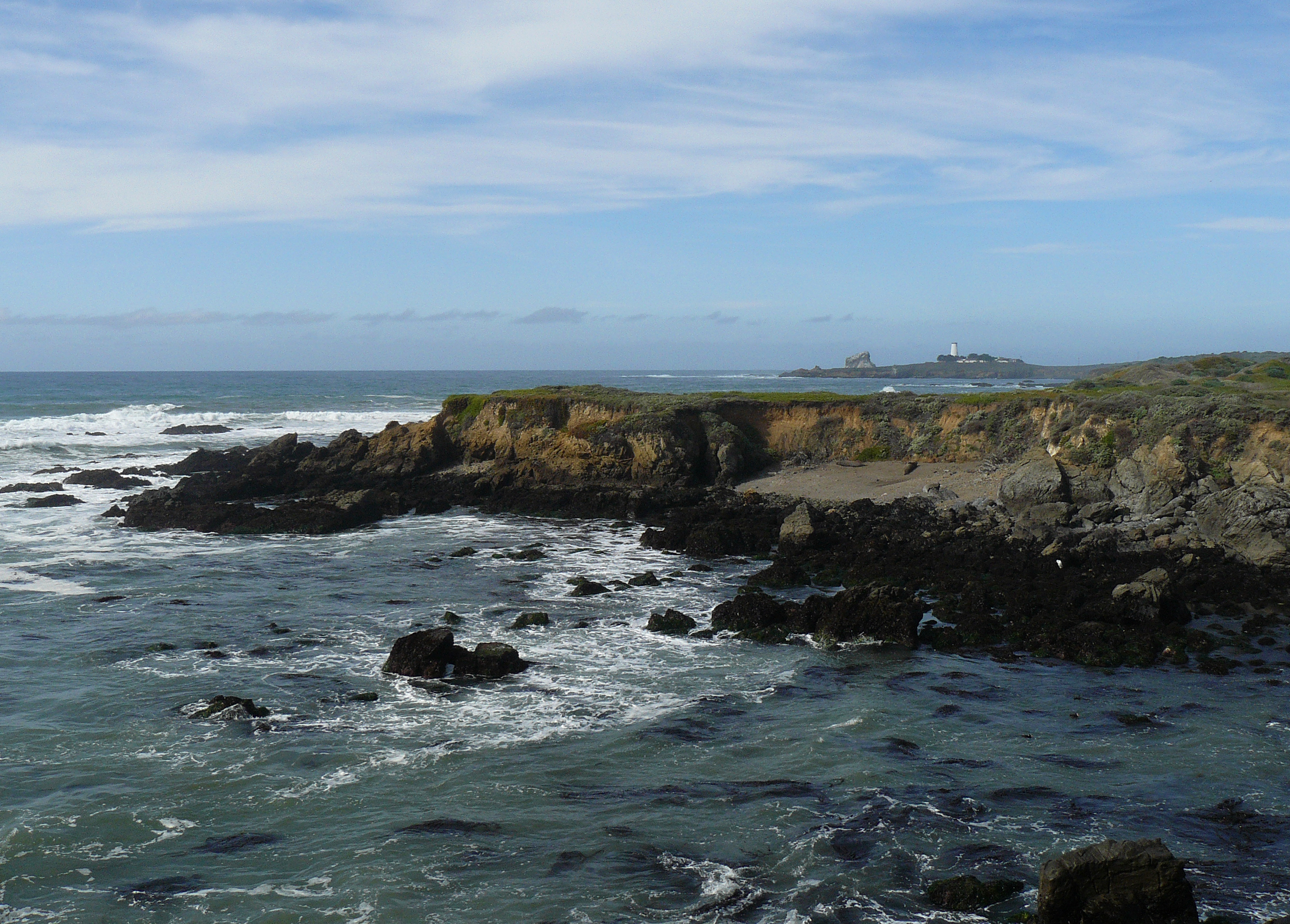
Coastline of the Piedras Blancas SMCA. Piedras Blancas Light Station is in the background.

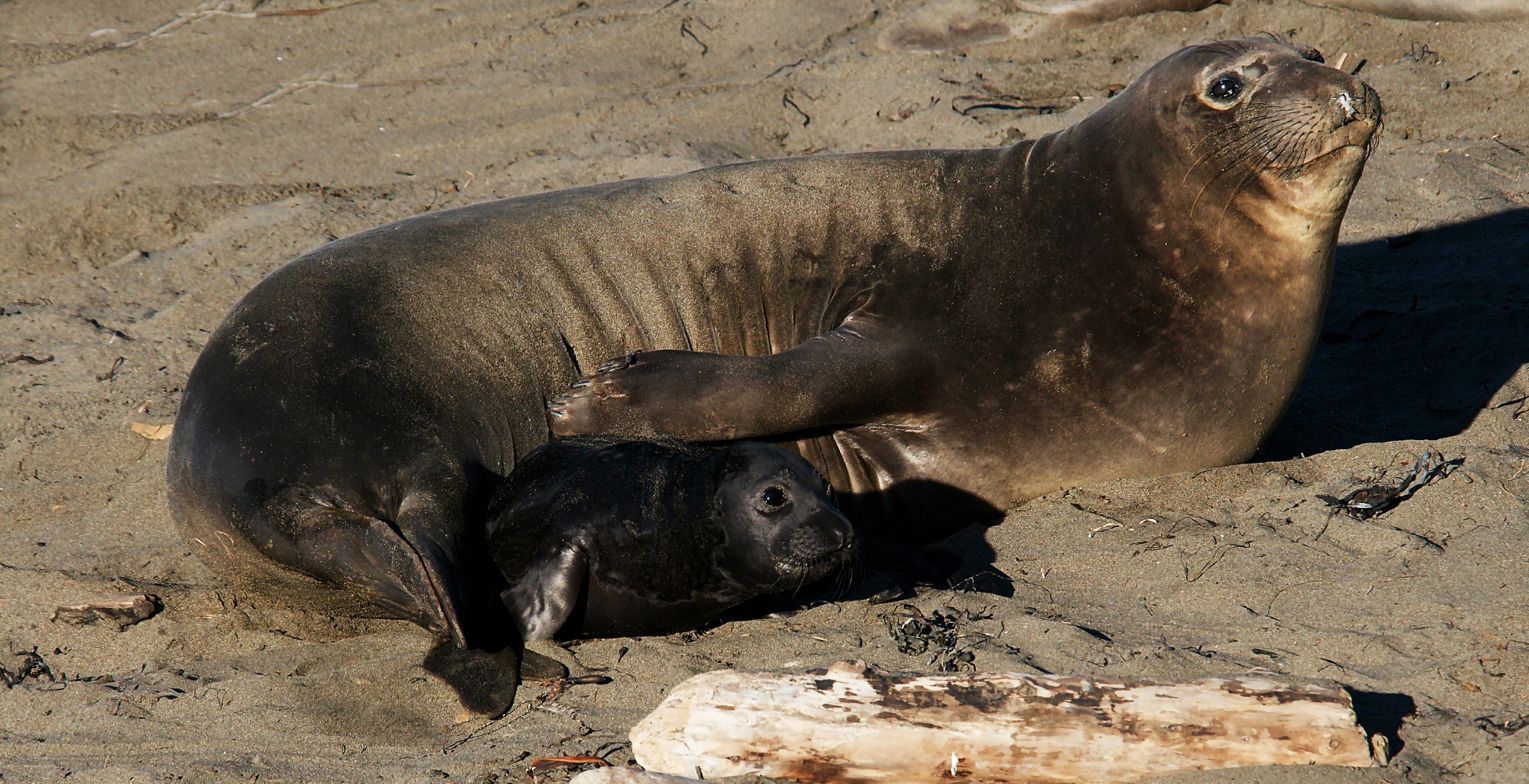
Elephant seal mother and pup, Piedras Blancas rookery 2009

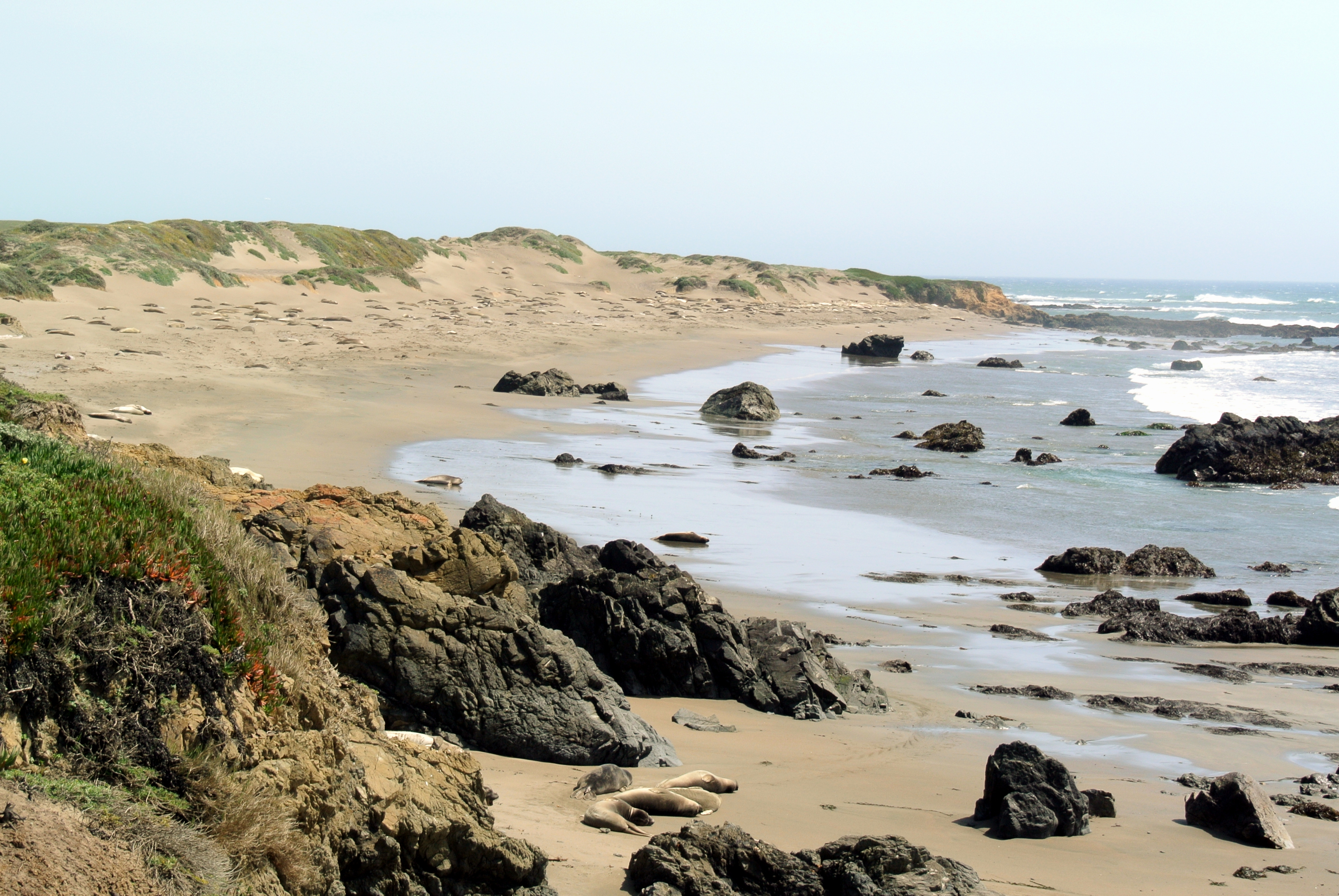
Piedras Blancas SMCA and seal colony

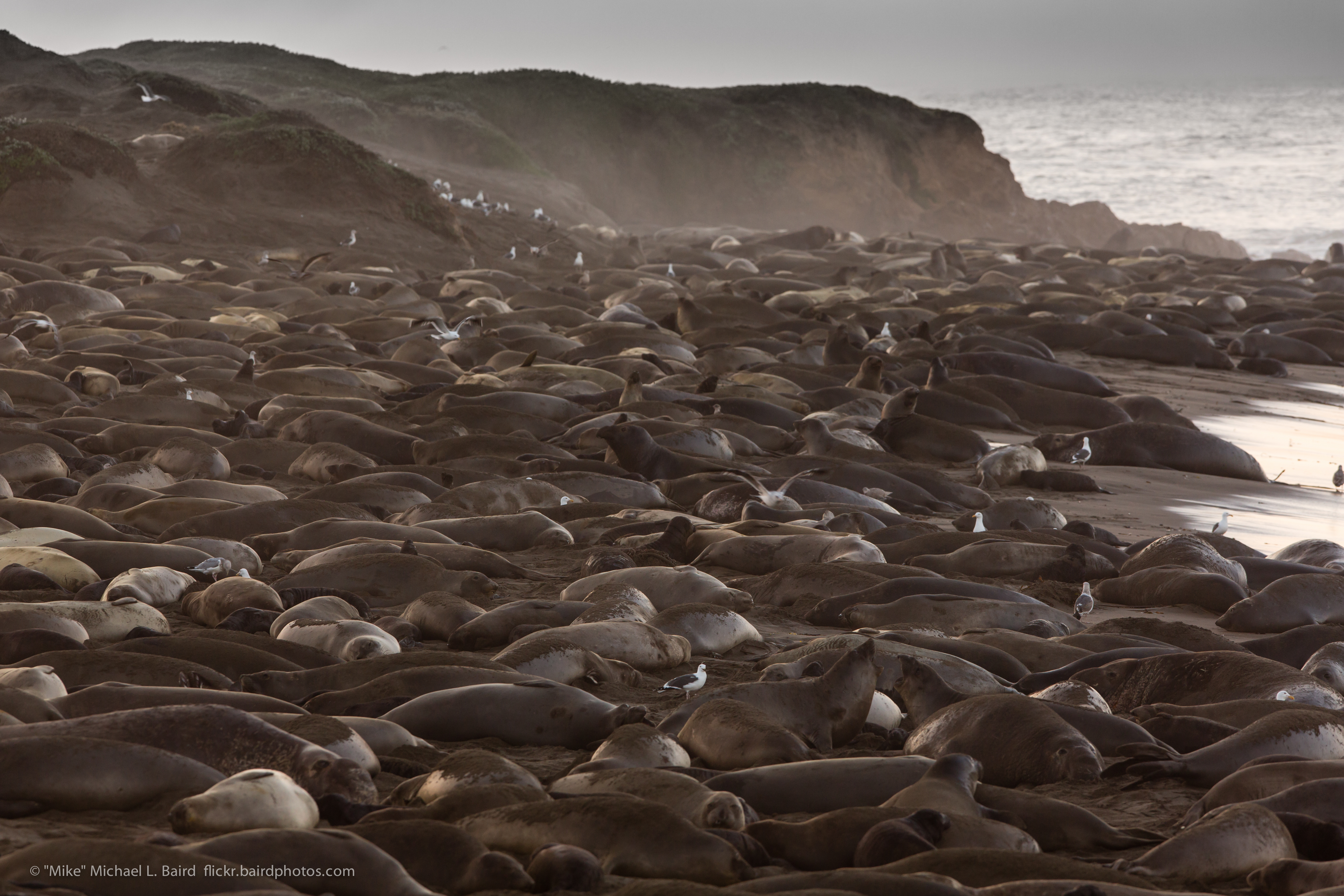
Piedras Blancas Elephant Seal rookery, January 2013

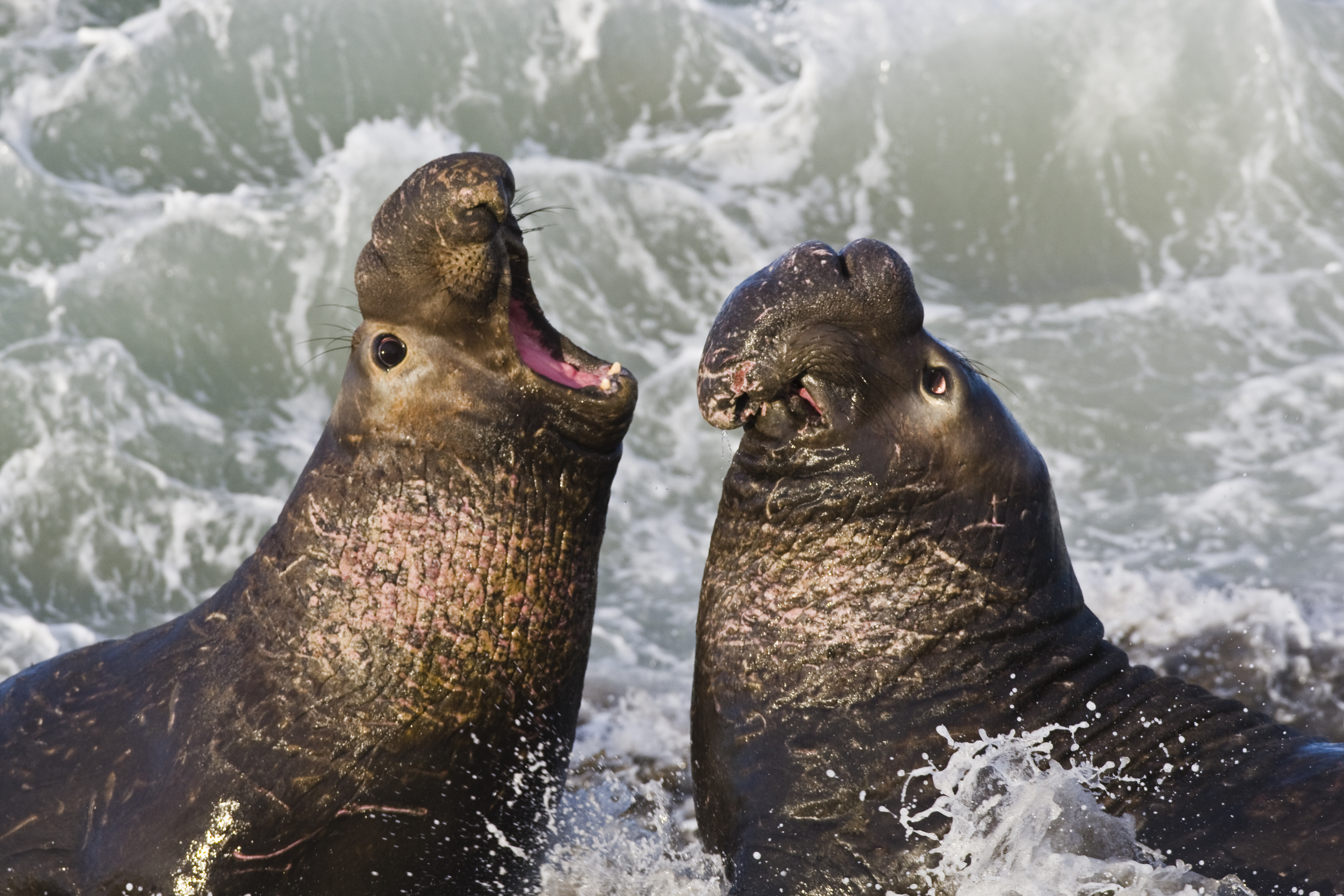
Elephant seals

Piedras Blancas State Marine Reserve (SMR) and Piedras Blancas State Marine Conservation Area (SMCA) are two adjoining marine protected areas that lie offshore of San Luis Obispo County on California's central coast. The combined area of these marine protected areas is 19.68 square miles (51.0 km^{2}). The SMR protects all marine life within its boundaries. Fishing and take of all living marine resources is prohibited. Within the SMCA fishing and take of all living marine resources is prohibited except the commercial and recreational take of salmon and albacore.

== History ==
Piedras Blancas SMR and Piedras Blancas SMCA were established in September 2007 by the California Department of Fish & Game. They are two of 29 marine protected areas adopted during the first phase of the Marine Life Protection Act Initiative. The Marine Life Protection Act Initiative (or MLPAI) is a collaborative public process to create a statewide network of marine protected areas along the California coastline.

== Habitat and wildlife ==
The Piedras Blancas marine protected areas encompass a rich nearshore, including extensive tidepools, two species of kelp, and both sandy and cobble beaches. Offshore, a high relief deepwater rocky structure attracts large forage fish populations and provides shelter for rockfish. These habitats support a particularly high diversity of birds and marine mammals including California sea lions, elephant seals, harbor seals, northern fur seals and sea otters. Historically this area was one of the most productive abalone beds in California. Many migratory whales most notably gray whales pass and rest through the area in annual seasons, and there had been a sighting of a North Pacific right whale, the most rare of large whales in the world in 1995.

The Piedras Blancas elephant seal rookery is located along California State Route 1 north of the towns of Cambria and San Simeon. Northern elephant seals, which range through the western Pacific Ocean from the Alaskan sea to the waters south of Baja California, were hunted to near extinction in the late 19th century for the sake of their blubber. A resurgent local population began scouting new beaches in the 1970s after rookeries on the California Channel Islands got crowded. A colony of 25 elephant seals established a rookery at Piedras Blancas and San Simeon beaches in 1990 and the elephant seal community has been growing steadily since that time. The first Piedras Blancas pup was born in 1992. The elephant seals use the beaches for mating beginning in December, and as a nursery for their pups through February or March, when the adults leave to begin migrating north. The pups "graduate" from the beach and take off hunting on their own by May. Subpopulations come back for a few weeks each in April through August, for a molting interlude. They do not eat while they molt, shedding fur and skin, and they leave after three or four weeks with a silvery new coat.

Elephant seals generally return to mate and molt on the beach where they were born, all other factors being equal. The average winter population as of 2000 was 4,000 individuals. By 2020, the local beaches hosted 15,000–25,000 elephant seals a year, with as many as 5,000 pups born annually. The elephant seal has a very specific hunting niche (prey are mostly deepwater species that live below the continental shelf, similar to the hunting habits of sperm whales), so that now they themselves are not being hunted by man, Northern elephant seals seem to be thriving, despite their lack of genetic diversity due to the population bottleneck that left them with a three-digit population at one time. Mature male elephant seals can weigh up to 4,500 pounds (2,000 kg), and all sizes and shapes of elephant seals will bite if they are annoyed.

== Geography and natural features ==
These two marine protected areas adjoin each other off the coast of San Luis Obispo County.

The Piedras Blancas SMR is bounded by the mean high tide line and straight lines connecting the following points in the order listed:

35° 42.85' N. lat. 121° 18.95' W. long.;

35° 42.85' N. lat. 121° 21.00' W. long.;

35° 39.15' N. lat. 121° 18.50' W. long.; and

35° 39.15' N. lat. 121° 14.45' W. long.

The Piedras Blancas SMCA is bounded by the mean high tide line and straight lines connecting the following points in the order listed except where noted:

35° 42.85' N. lat. 121° 21.00' W. long.;

35° 42.85' N. lat. 121° 22.85' W. long.; thence southward along the

three nautical mile offshore boundary to

35° 39.15' N. lat. 121° 20.90' W. long.;

35° 39.15' N. lat. 121° 18.50' W. long.; and

35° 42.85' N. lat. 121° 21.00' W. long.

== Recreation and nearby attractions ==
Hearst Castle, former home of William Randolph Hearst, is at nearby Hearst San Simeon State Historic Monument and offers visitor tours.

The Piedras Blancas Light Station is an Outstanding Natural Area, managed by the Bureau of Land Management. The lighthouse was built in 1875 and a Victorian dwelling was later completed. Tours are offered to the public.

Piedreas Blancas is an important elephant seal rookery. Friends of the Elephant Seal is a non-profit organization dedicated to educating people about elephant seals and other marine life.

California's marine protected areas encourage recreational and educational uses of the ocean. Activities such as kayaking, diving, snorkeling, and swimming are allowed unless otherwise restricted.

== Scientific monitoring ==
As specified by the Marine Life Protection Act, select marine protected areas along California's central coast are being monitored by scientists to track their effectiveness and learn more about ocean health. Similar studies in marine protected areas located off of the Santa Barbara Channel Islands have already detected gradual improvements in fish size and number.

Local scientific and educational institutions involved in the monitoring include Stanford University's Hopkins Marine Station, University of California Santa Cruz, Moss Landing Marine Laboratories and Cal Poly San Luis Obispo. Research methods include hook-and-line sampling, intertidal and scuba diver surveys, and the use of Remote Operated Vehicle (ROV) submarines.
