= Weanling =

Young animal just weaned from its mother

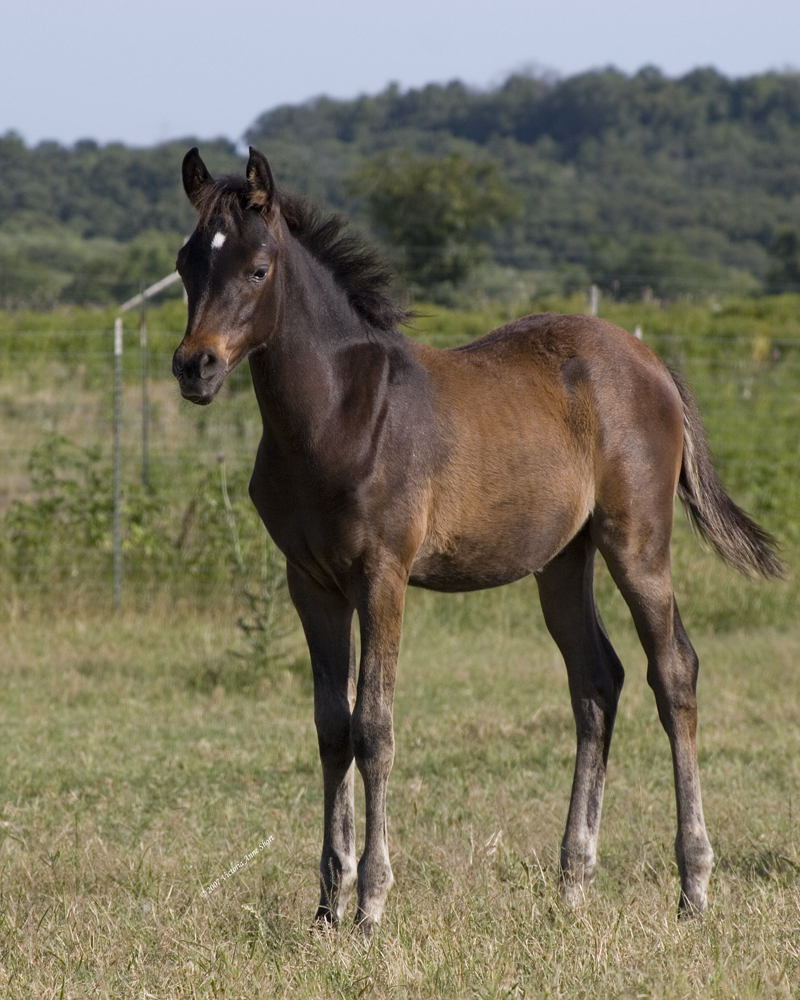
A weanling horse

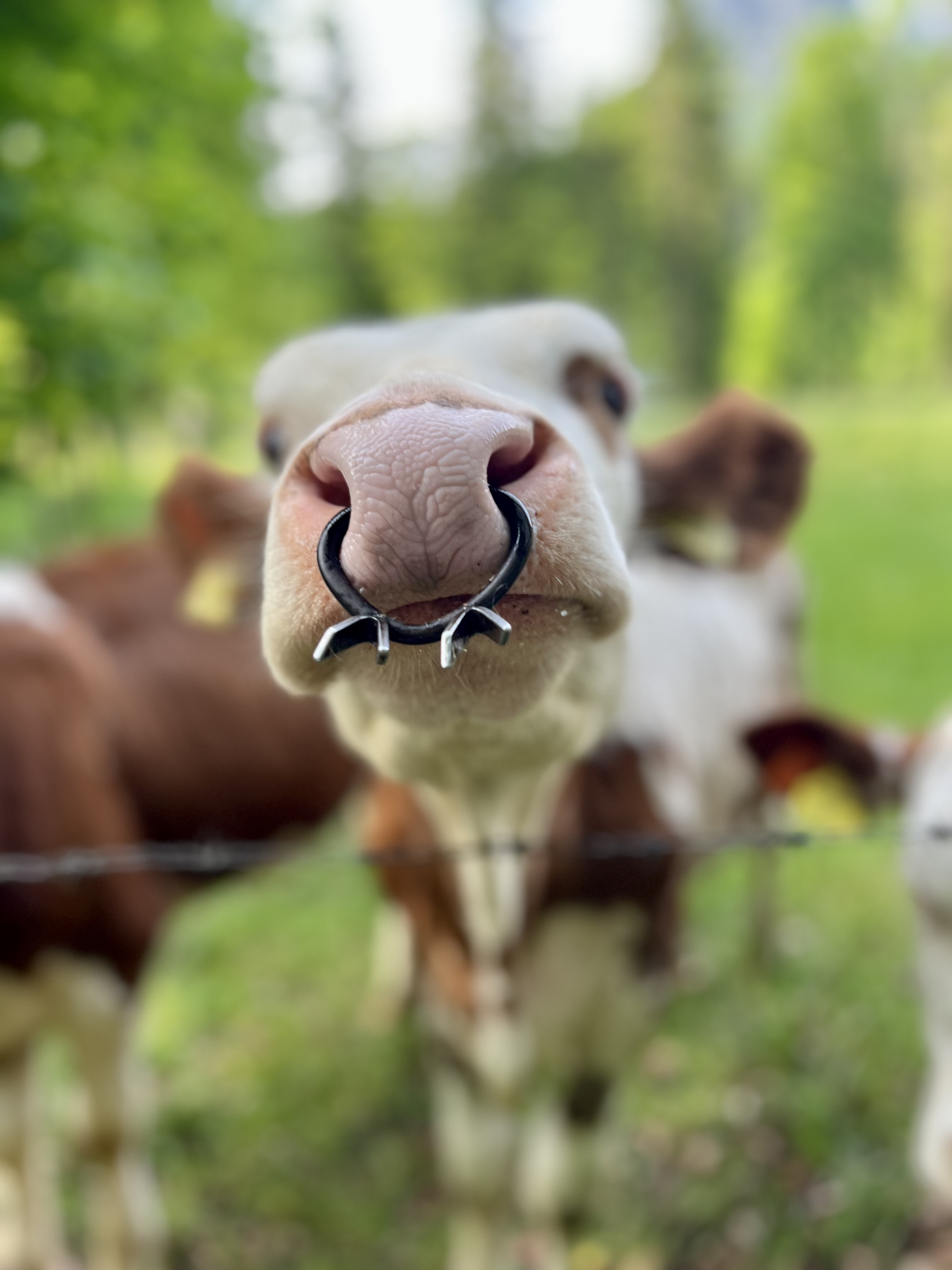
Weaner ring on a calf

A weanling or weaner is an animal that has been weaned, eats solid food independently, and no longer relies on its mother's milk for nutrients. Weanling usually refers to a horse, though can be used with any livestock. Weaner is more commonly used for a weaned lamb, calf or pig. A super weaner is an exceptionally large elephant seal which has been nursing from more than one lactating female and weighs considerably more than its peers at weaning age.

A weanling horse is a foal that has been weaned, usually between four and six months old. Once it is a year old, the horse is referred to as a yearling. Weanlings are separated from their dam and often grouped with other weanlings to keep each other company. Weaning is a very stressful time for a foal.

A weaner also refers to an anti-suckling device, such as a metal or plastic flap or spiked ring placed over an animal's mouth to inhibit it from nursing from its mother, or stop persistent sucking behaviors on inappropriate objects, such as another calf's ears, or a dry cow's teats.

== See also ==
- Nose ring (animal) § Calf-weaning nose ring
- Cow-calf separation
