= Friends of the Elephant Seal =

U.S. non-profit organization

- Formation: 1997; 29 years ago
- Website: elephantseal.org

Friends of the Elephant Seal is a non-profit organization founded in 1997 dedicated to educating people about elephant seals based in California. Their visitor center is located in San Simeon, where the Piedras Blancas rookery is home to over 25,000 seals.
