= Super weaner =

Exceptionally large elephant seal at weaning age

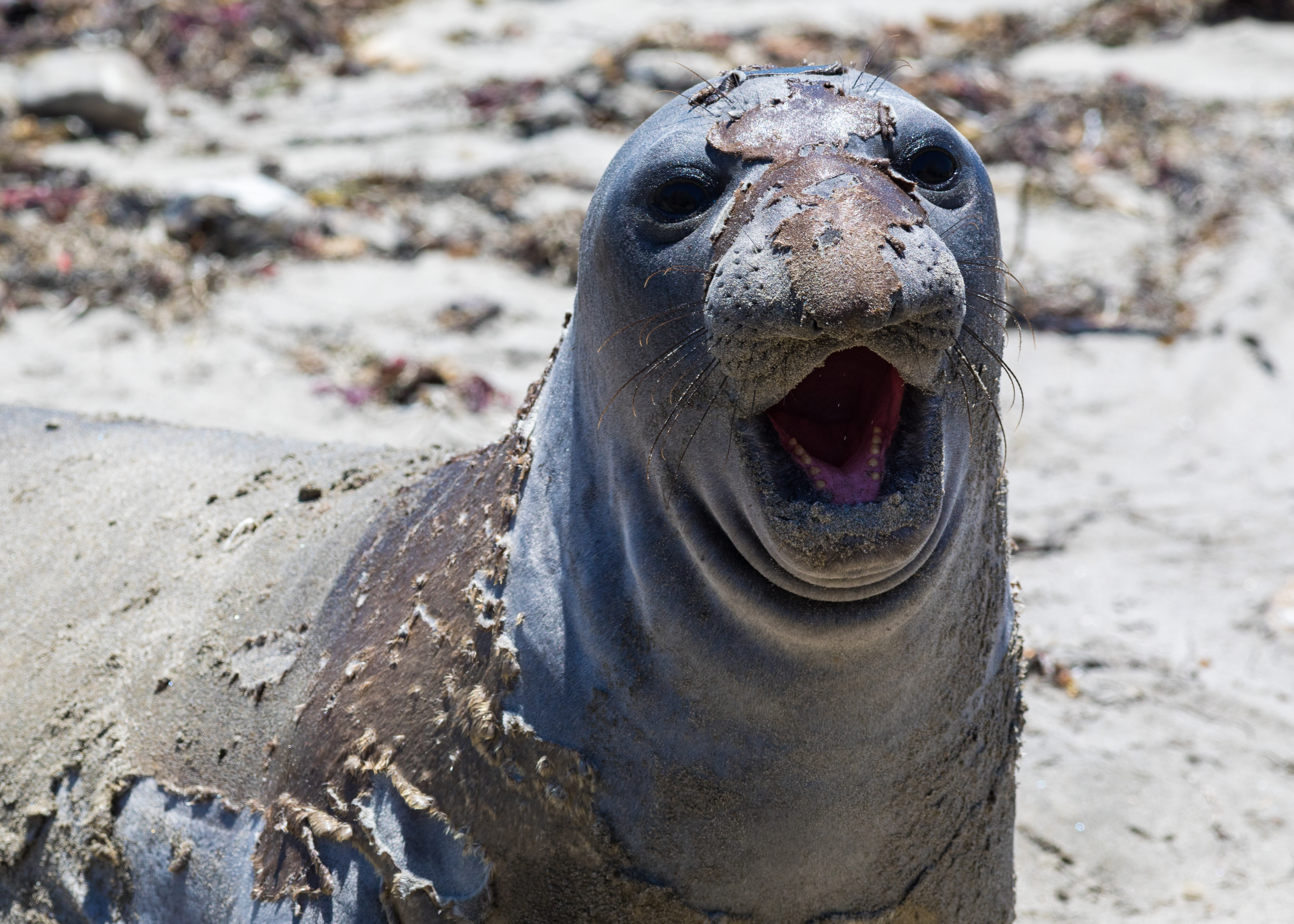
A juvenile northern elephant seal during its molt

A super weaner (also super-weaner or superweaner) is an exceptionally large elephant seal at weaning age. Super weaners may reach their large sizes by stealing milk from nursing female elephant seals or by being adopted by an additional mother elephant seal.

== Background ==
Elephant seals have an abrupt weaning process, in which the weaned juvenile seal does not receive assistance from its parents in finding food. The postweaning period is important for the seals' development, with a high mortality rate.

== Phenomenon ==
A super weaner, an elephant seal at weaning age which obtains milk from multiple females, can weigh 600 pounds (270 kg). A typical elephant seal at the same age weighs between 250 pounds (110 kg) and 350 pounds (160 kg). While most mother elephant seals will bite weaned elephant seals that attempt to suckle, some will allow it for unknown reasons; some super weaners also obtain the additional milk through theft.

== Instances ==
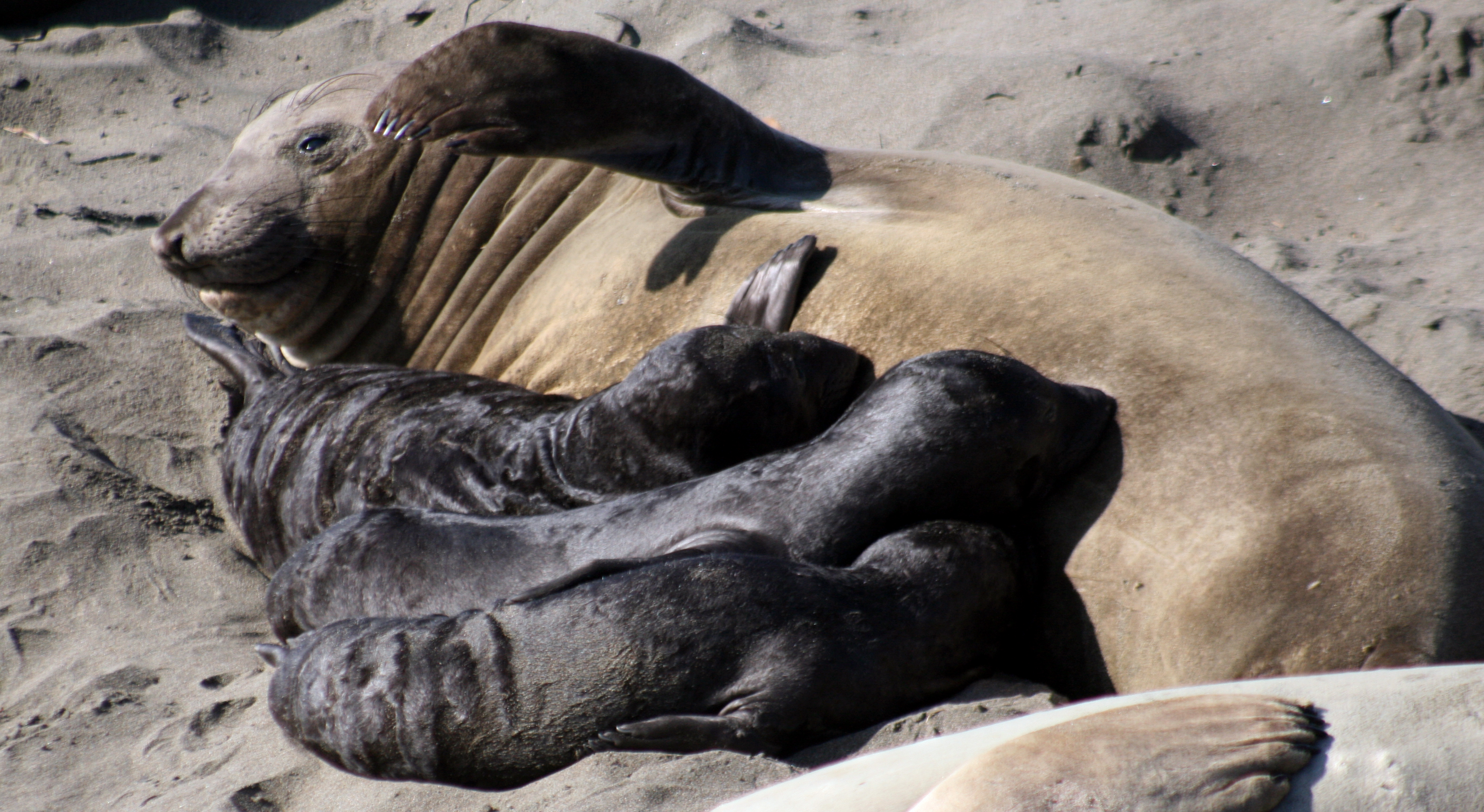
Three northern elephant seal pups nursing from a single female

A study carried out on Año Nuevo Island in California between 1972 and 1977 observed the existence of some recently weaned northern elephant seal pups which either stole milk from nursing females or were "adopted by foster mothers." Male pups were more persistent and successful at stealing milk, and the largest weaners were universally male, including exceptionally large weaners which the study defined as "superweaners". These seals were "so large that their corpulence impeded their movements"; observation of two of them showed that their ability to acquire additional milk after being weaned was a major factor in their size. The study additionally found that the large weaner seals reach their large sizes through two distinct strategies: by stealing milk from nursing female elephant seals ("milk thieves"), or by being adopted by an additional mother elephant seal ("double mother-sucklers").

A 2014 study published in Proceedings of the Royal Society B explored the benefits of high fat stores in female northern elephant seals, which relate to their buoyancy. Daniel P. Costa, one of the authors, later stated that the findings might explain a known phenomenon in which super weaners are rarely seen again after departing the rookery. Costa suggested that super weaners are likely so buoyant that they have difficulty figuring out how to feed.

A 2021 study, also in Proceedings of the Royal Society B, removed super weaners from modeling analyses because it utilized "the assumption that a single mother nursed a single pup throughout the average lactation period". Super weaners were defined as weaners weighing more than 170 kilograms (370 lb). This study found that both male and female pups can become super weaners, although they are more likely to be male (64% of 94 super weaners measured).

== In popular culture ==
In "The Maternal Combustion", a 2015 episode of The Big Bang Theory, Leonard Hofstadter compares Sheldon Cooper to an elephant seal pup who steals milk because Hofstadter feels Cooper is getting all the attention from Hofstadter's mother in addition to his own. Cooper replies that because both mothers are seeking to give him their attention, he is not a super-weaner, but rather a double mother suckler.

The term was also used in a 2025 episode of the Netflix animated series The Creature Cases called "The Mystery of the Missing Milk," which saw animal detectives Sam Snow and Kit Casey investigating a series of milk thefts by a super weaner on a beach populated by elephant seals.
