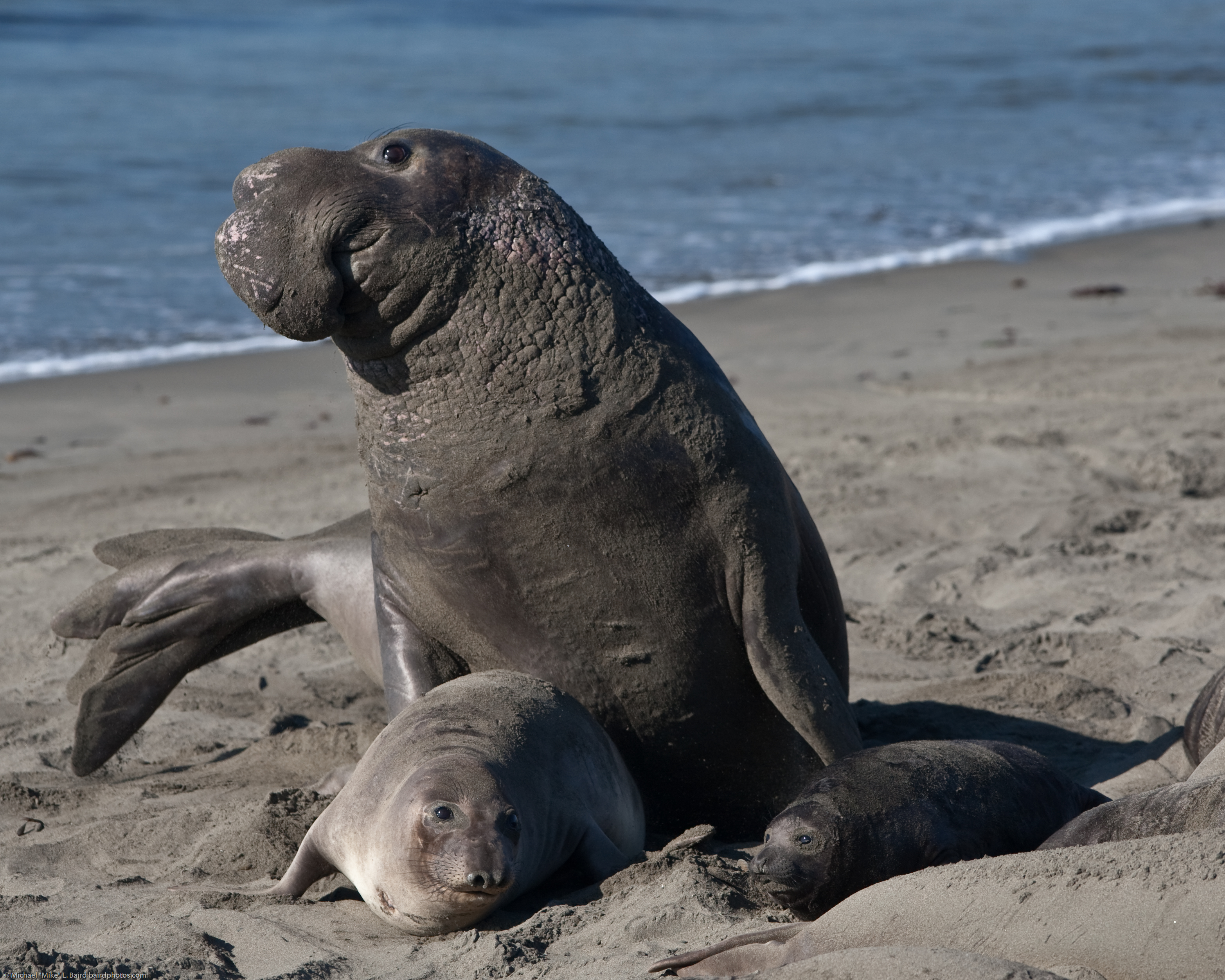
- Male (bull), female (cow) and pup

Conservation status
- Least Concern (IUCN 3.1)
- CITES Appendix II

Scientific classification
- Kingdom: Animalia
- Phylum: Chordata
- Class: Mammalia
- Order: Carnivora
- Parvorder: Pinnipedia
- Family: Phocidae
- Genus: Mirounga
- Species: M. angustirostris

Binomial name
- Mirounga angustirostris (Gill, 1866)
- Distribution of the northern elephant seal (red: breeding colonies; yellow: non-breeding individuals)

= Northern elephant seal =

Northern elephant seal Temporal range: Pleistocene-recent

Species of marine mammal

The northern elephant seal (Mirounga angustirostris) or northern sea elephant, is one of two species of elephant seal (the other is the southern elephant seal). It is a member of the family Phocidae (true seals). Elephant seals derive their name from their great size and from the male's large proboscis. Sexual dimorphism in size is great. Correspondingly, the mating system is highly polygynous; a successful male is able to impregnate up to 50 females in one season.

== Description ==
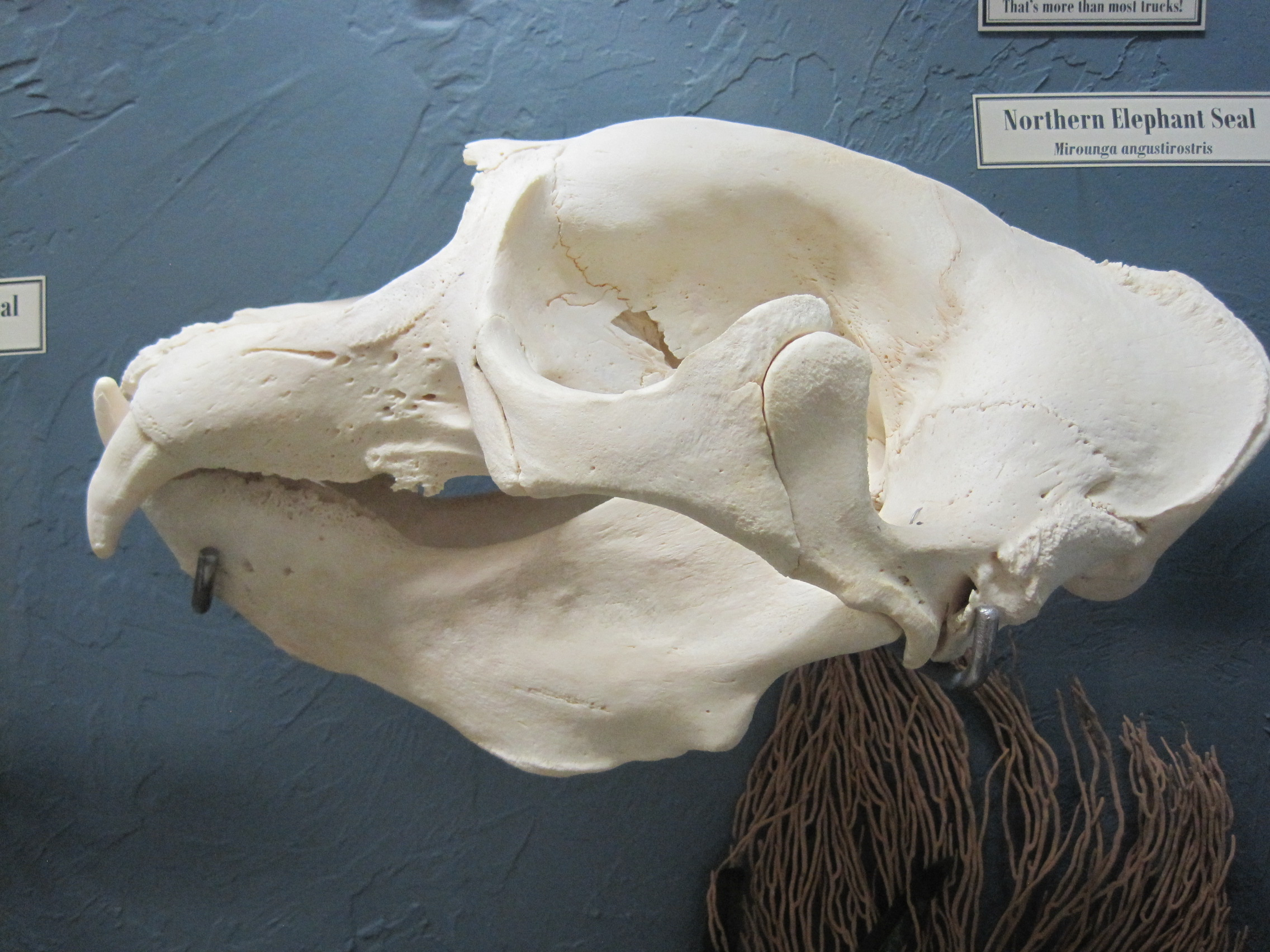
Northern elephant seal skull on display at the Museum of Osteology, Oklahoma City, Oklahoma

The huge male northern elephant seal typically weighs 1,500–2,300 kg (3,300–5,100 lb) and measures 4–5 m (13–16 ft), although some males can weigh up to 3,700 kg (8,200 lb). Females are much smaller and can range from 400 to 900 kg (880 to 1,980 lb) in weight, or roughly a third of the male's bulk, and measure from 2.5 to 3.6 m (8.2 to 11.8 ft). The bull southern elephant seals are, on average, larger than those in the northern species, but the females in both are around the same size, indicating the even higher level of sexual dimorphism in the southern species. Although a few females have been observed to reach 23 years of age and a few males to reach 14, most die much younger.

Pups are born with dark, almost black fur that they shed after weaning to turn silvery grey. As they develop, both juveniles and adults go through a molting period in which their initially black fur is replaced with a coat that ranges from silver to deep grey, finally fading to tan. Adult males' necks and chests are furless and have a speckled pattern of pink, white, and light brown. This thicker, calloused skin on the neck builds a protective shield in preparation for fights they participate in during the mating season.

The eyes are large, round, and black. The width of the eyes and a high concentration of low-light pigments suggest sight plays an important role in the capture of prey. Even more important than their excellent low light eyesight, the elephant seal’s whiskers act as hydrodynamic prey sensors, playing the primary role in sensing and locating prey. Thus, their whiskers are an evolutionary alternative to echolocation for finding food in the darkness of the deep ocean environment.

As members of the Phocidae family of pinnipeds, elephant seals have no external ears, shorter fore-flippers and hind flippers that cannot rotate forward for land movement, unlike sea lions in the Otariidae family of pinnipeds. Once land mammals, over many thousands of years their feet evolved into fore-flippers and hind flippers. The fore-flippers have five finger like digits with nails. Movement on land is an awkward looking lunging motion but can be quite quick for short distances. Elephant seals swim by using their strong rear flippers in a lateral side-to-side motion. They have been recorded to swim up to 116km (72 miles) per day.

Like other seals, elephant seals' bloodstreams are adapted to the cold in which a mixture of small veins surrounds arteries capturing heat from them. The network of veins and arteries is called counter-current heat exchange to help maintain body temperature. This structure is present in extremities such as the hind-limbs.

A unique characteristic of the northern elephant seal is that it has developed the ability to store oxygenated red blood cells (RBC) within its spleen. In a 2004 study researchers used MRI to observe physiological changes of the spleens of five seal pups during simulated dives. By three minutes, the spleens on average contracted to a fifth of their original size, indicating a dive-related sympathetic contraction of the spleen. Also, a delay was observed between contraction of the spleen and increased hematocrit within the circulating blood, and attributed to the hepatic sinus. This fluid-filled structure is initially expanded due to the rush of RBC from the spleen and slowly releases the red blood cells into the circulatory system via a muscular vena caval sphincter found on the cranial aspect of the diaphragm. This ability to slowly introduce RBC into the blood stream is likely to prevent any harmful effects caused by a rapid increase in hematocrit.

== Range and ecology ==
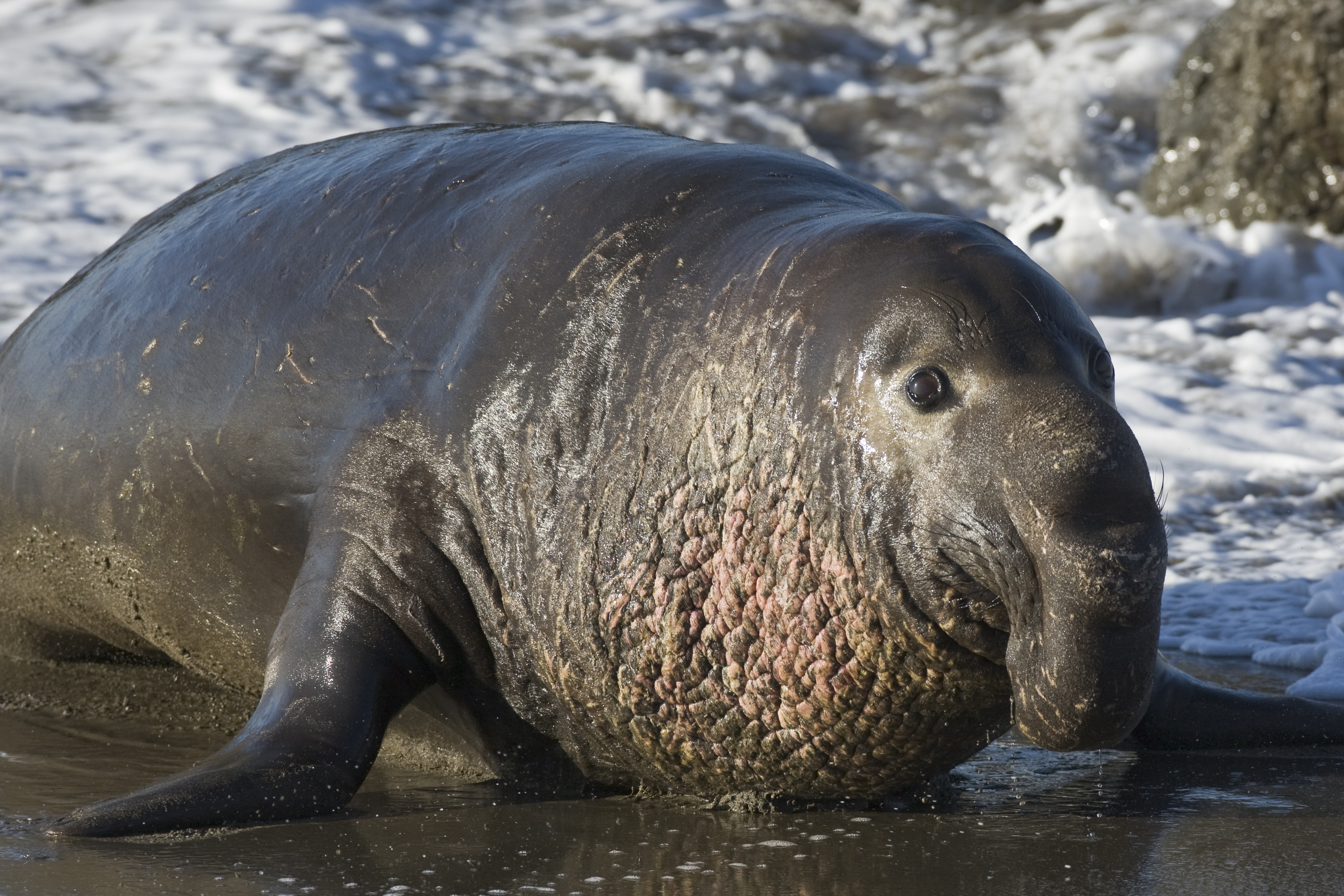
Bull At Piedras Blancas, San Simeon

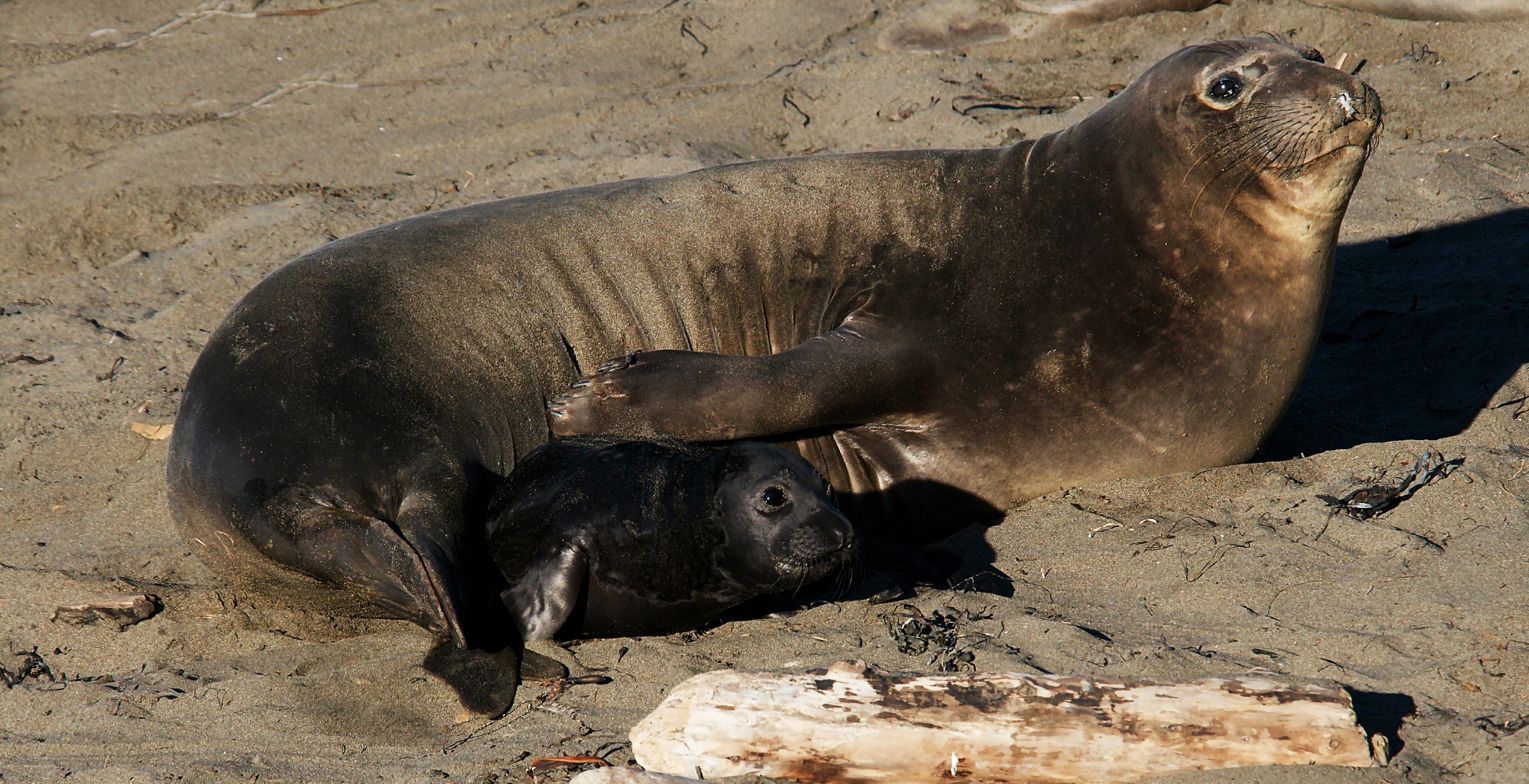
Mother and pup, Piedras Blancas

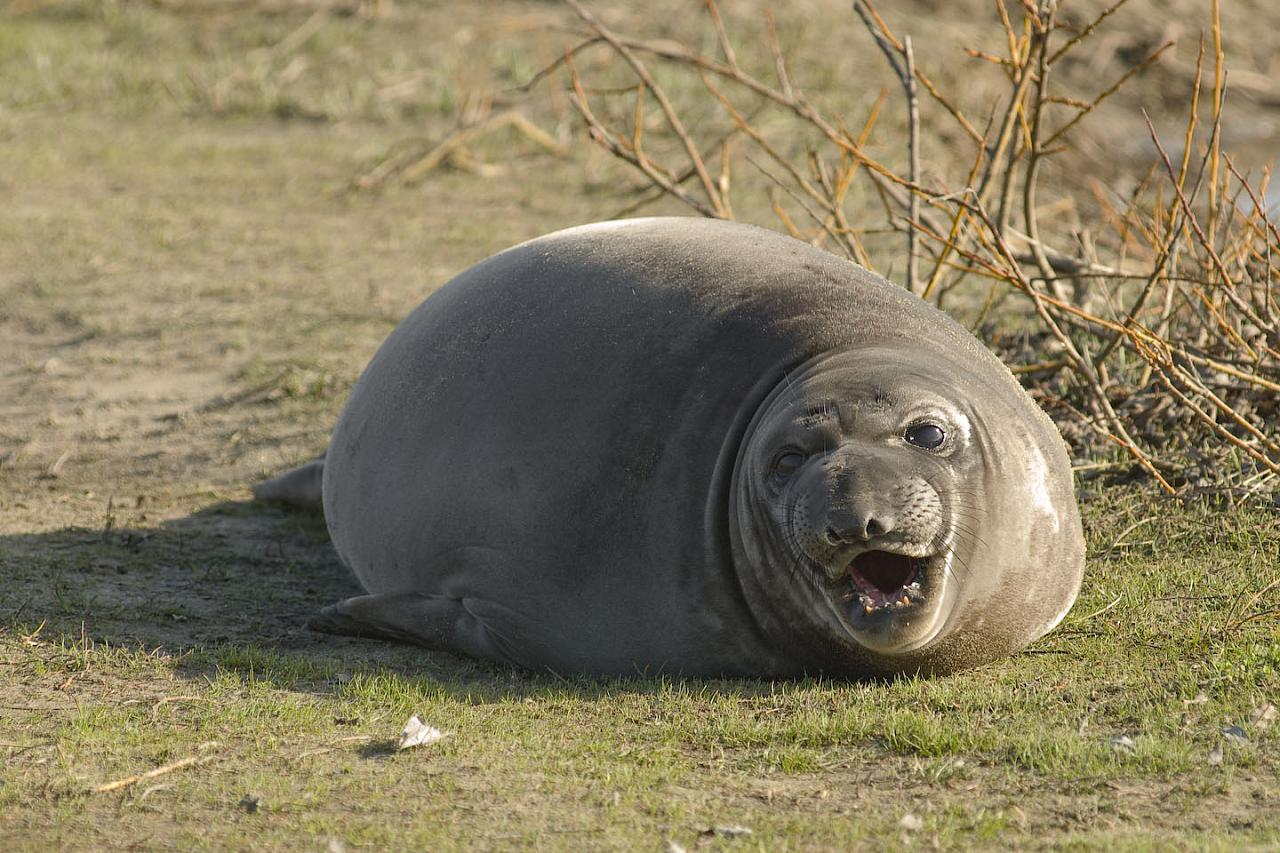
Pup, Año Nuevo State

The northern elephant seal lives in the eastern Pacific Ocean. They spend most of their time at sea, and usually only come to land to give birth, breed, and molt. These activities occur at rookeries that are located on offshore islands or remote mainland beaches. The majority of these rookeries are in California and northern Baja California, ranging from Point Reyes National Seashore, California to Isla Natividad, Mexico. Significant breeding colonies exist at Channel Islands, Año Nuevo State Reserve, Piedras Blancas Light, and the Farallon Islands in the US, and Isla Guadalupe, Isla Benito del Este and Isla Cedros in Mexico. In recent decades the breeding range has extended northwards. In 1976 the first pup was found on Point Reyes and a breeding colony established there in 1981. Since the mid-1990s some breeding has been observed at Castle Rock in Northern California and Shell Island off Oregon, and in January 2009 the first elephant seal births were recorded in British Columbia at Race Rocks. The California breeding population is now demographically isolated from the population in Baja California.

Northern elephant seals exhibit extreme sexual dimorphism in their feeding behaviours. When the males leave their rookeries, they migrate northwards to their feeding grounds along the continental shelf from Washington to the western Aleutians in Alaska. The males mostly feed on benthic organisms on the ocean floor. When the females leave their rookeries, they head north or west into open ocean, and forage across a large area in the northeastern Pacific. They have been recorded as far west as Hawaii. Female elephant seals feed mainly on pelagic organisms in the water column.

Vagrant elephant seals possibly appear on tropical regions such as at Mariana Islands. Historical occurrences of elephant seal presence, residential or occasional, in western North Pacific are fairly unknown. There have been two records of vagrants visiting to Japanese coasts; a male on Niijima in 1989 and a young seal on beaches in Hasama, Tateyama in 2001. A 2.5-metre (8 ft 2 in) female was found on Sanze beach, Tsuruoka, Yamagata in October 2017, making it the first record from Sea of Japan. This individual was severely weakened but showing signs of recovery after receiving medications at Kamo Aquarium, and the aquarium is discussing whether or not to release her. Some individuals have been observed on the coast of northeast Asia. Certain individuals established haul-out sites at the Commander Islands in the early 2000s; however, due to aggressive interactions with local Steller sea lions, long-term colonization is not expected.

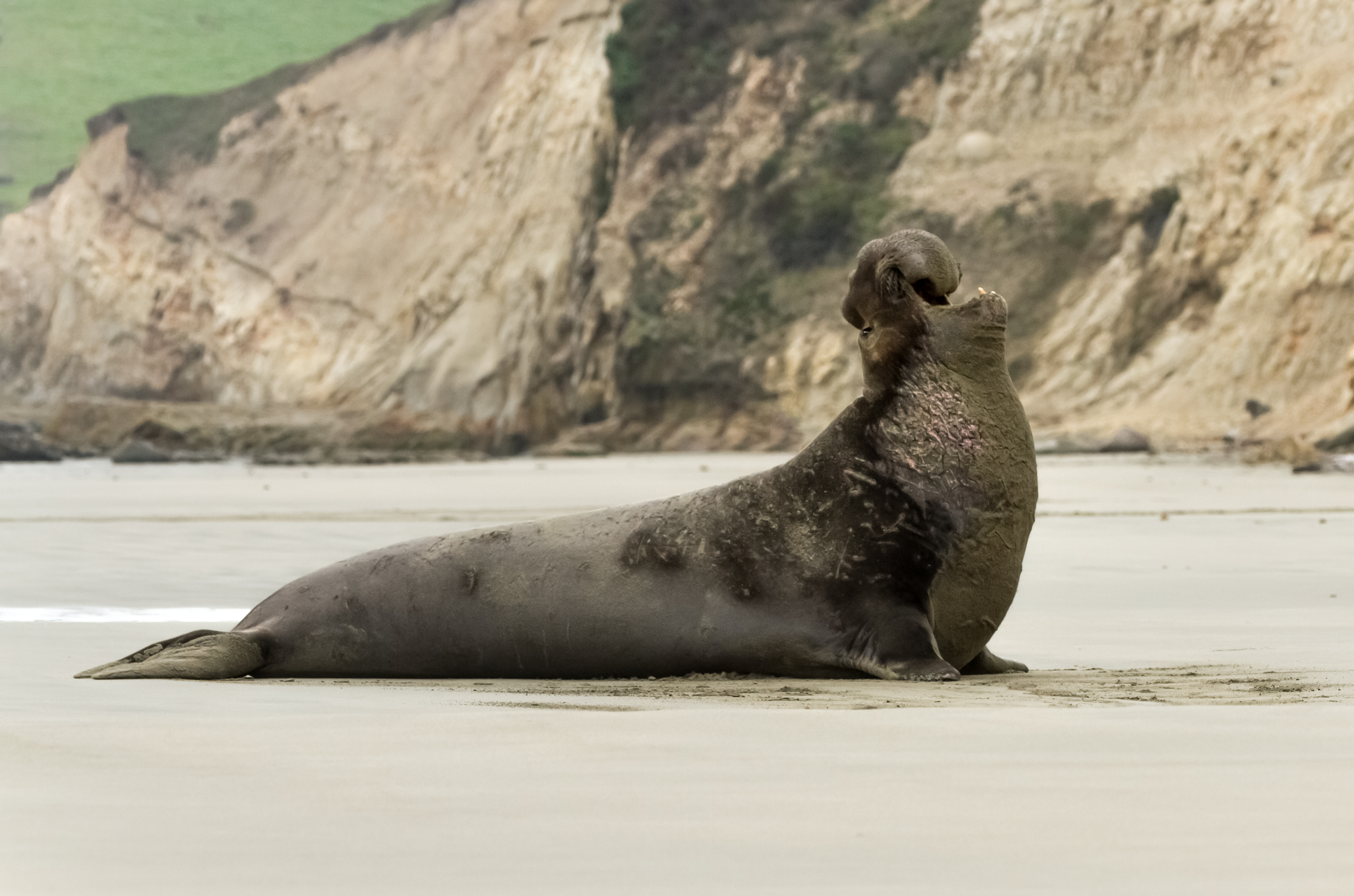
Adult male northern elephant seal at Point Reyes National Seashore, California

Female elephant seals forage in the open ocean, while male elephant seals forage along the continental shelf. Males usually dive straight down to the ocean floor and stay at the bottom foraging for benthic prey. The females hunt for pelagic prey in the open ocean, and dive deeper — up to 1,735 metres (5,692 ft), though on average about 500 metres (1,640 ft) — and stay down longer than the males. Female elephant seals have been tagged and found to dive almost continuously for 20 hours or more a day, mostly in 400-to-600-metre (1,310 to 1,970 ft) deep water, where small fish are abundant.

Northern elephant seals eat a variety of prey, including mesopelagic fish such as myctophids, deep-water squid, Pacific hake, pelagic crustaceans, relatively small sharks, rays, and ratfish. Octopoteuthis deletron squid are a common prey item; one study found this species in the stomachs of 58% of individuals sampled off the coast of California. A female northern elephant seal was documented in 2013 by a deep sea camera at a depth of 894 m (2,933 ft), where she consumed a Pacific hagfish, slurping it up from the ocean floor. The event was reported by a Ukrainian boy named Kirill Dudko, who further reported the find to scientists in Canada. Elephant seals do not need to drink, as they get their water from food and metabolism of fats.

While hunting in the dark depths, elephant seals seem to locate their prey at least partly by vision; the bioluminescence of some prey animals can facilitate their capture. Feeding-event recorders with light sensors demonstrated that bioluminescence contributed to only about 20% of overall foraging success, confirming that whiskers play the primary role in sensing prey. Males and females differ in diving behavior. Males tend to hug the continental shelf while making deep dives and forage along the bottom, while females have more jagged routes and forage in the open ocean. Elephant seals are prey for orcas and great white sharks. Both are most likely to hunt pups, and seldom hunt large bull elephant seals, but have taken seals of all ages. The shark, when hunting adults, is most likely to ambush a seal with a damaging bite and wait until it is weakened by blood loss to finish the kill.

== Social behavior and reproduction ==
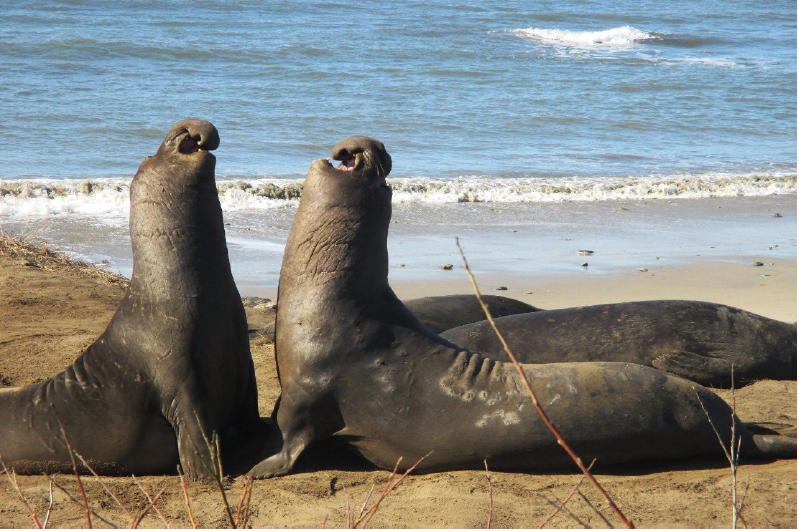
Two males confront one another at Año Nuevo State Park in California.

Male elephant seals fighting for mates

Northern elephant seals return to their terrestrial breeding ground in December and January, with the bulls arriving first. The bulls haul out on isolated or otherwise protected beaches, typically on islands or very remote mainland locations. It is important that these beach areas offer protection from the winter storms and high surf wave action. The bulls engage in fights of supremacy to determine which few bulls will achieve a harem.

After the males have arrived on the beach, the females arrive to give birth. Females fast for five weeks and nurse their single pup for four weeks; in the last few days of lactation, females come into estrus and mate. Mating behavior relates to a social hierarchy, and stronger males are considered higher rank than those smaller and weaker. In this polygynous society, a high-ranking bull can have a harem of 30–100 cows, depending on his size and strength. Males unable to establish harems will wait on the periphery, and will try to mount nearby females. Dominant bulls will disrupt copulations of lower-ranking bulls. They can mount females without interference, but commonly break off to chase off rivals. While fights are not usually to the death, they are brutal and often with significant bloodshed and injury; however, in many cases of mismatched opponents, the younger, less capable males are simply chased away, often to upland dunes. In a lifetime, a successful bull could easily sire over 500 pups. Most copulations in a breeding colony are done by only a small number of males and the rest may never be able to mate with a female. Copulation is most often on land, and takes roughly five minutes. Pups are sometimes crushed during battles between bulls.

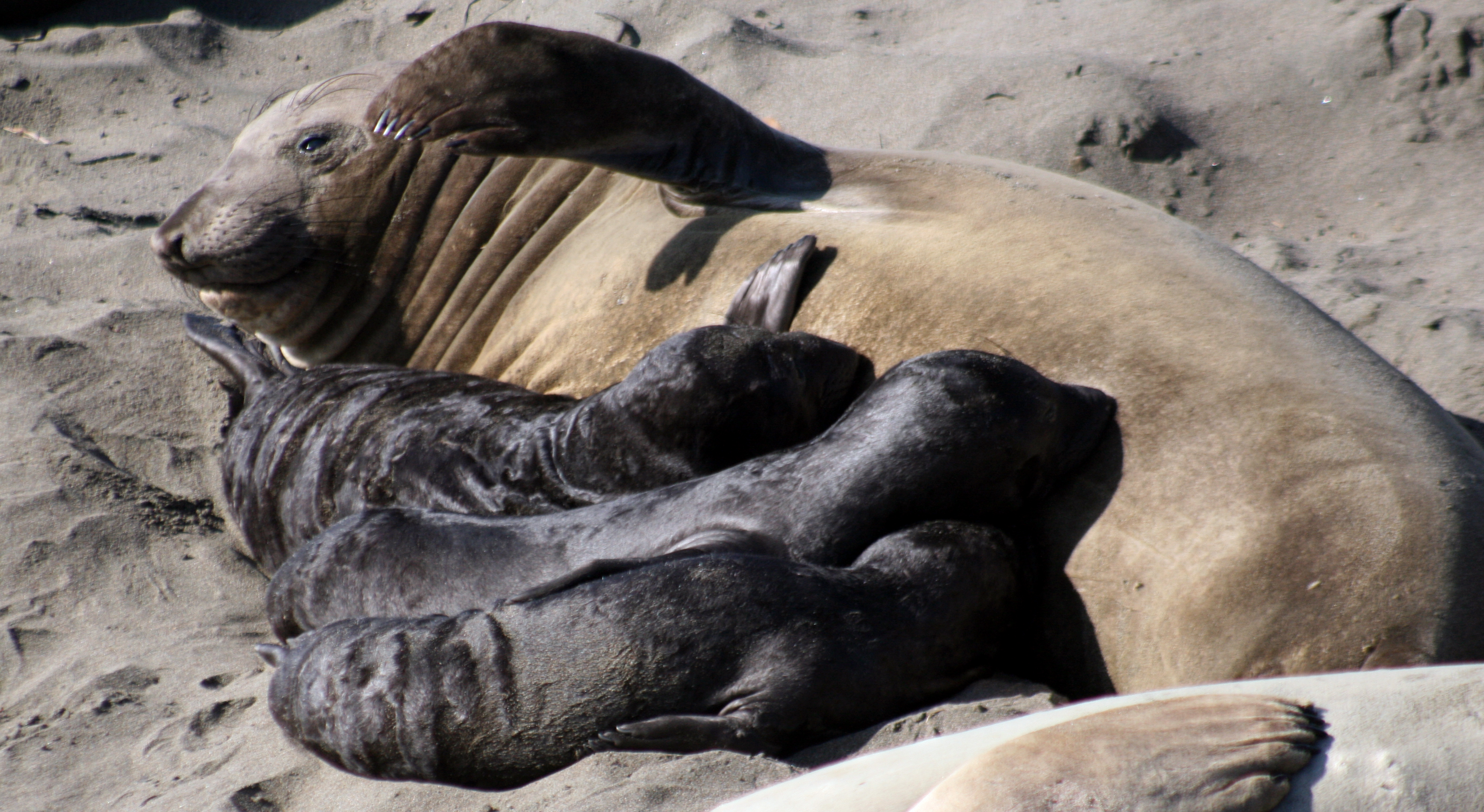
Three pups nursing from a single adult female. Female elephant seals deliver only one pup; the two others may have wandered away from their mothers and gotten lost. In this situation, no pup would get enough milk.

After arrival on shore, males fast for three months, and females fast for five weeks during mating and when nursing their pups. The gestation period is about 7 months but the fertilized egg will not attach to the uterine wall for four months after copulation. This process is called delayed implantation and is a strategy that allows females to time their arrival to breeding beaches with their time of parturition. One study observed the vast majority of births to take place at night, and in the aforementioned harems. Immediately after birth, a female will turn to her pup and emit a warbling vocalization to attract them, and will continue to throughout the nursing period. Sometimes, a female can become very aggressive after giving birth and will defend her pup from other females. Such aggression is more common in crowded beaches. While most females nurse their own pups and reject nursings from alien pups, some do accept alien pups with their own. An orphaned pup may try to find another female to suckle and some are adopted, at least on Año Nuevo Island. Some pups, known as super weaners, may grow to exceptionally large sizes by nursing from other females in addition to their mothers. Pups nurse about four weeks and are weaned abruptly before being abandoned by their mother, who heads out to sea within a few days. Pups gain weight rapidly during the nursing period, and weigh 300–400 pounds (136–181 kg) on average upon being weaned. Left alone, weaned pups will gather into groups and stay on shore for 12 more weeks. The pups learn how to swim in the surf and eventually swim farther to forage. Thus, their first long journey at sea begins.

Elephant seals communicate though various means. Males will threaten each other with threat vocalization originating in the throat. It has been described as a drumming noise, an outboard motor and a motorcycle idling in a gymnasium. The nose in not involved in the threat vocalizations of males, as once thought. Pups will vocalize when stressed or when prodding their mothers to allow them to suckle. Females make an unpulsed attraction call when responding to their young, and a harsh, pulsed call when threatened by other females, males or alien pups. Elephant seals produce low-frequency sounds, both substrate-borne and air-borne. These sounds help maintain social hierarchy in crowded or noisy environments and reduce energy consumption when fasting.

== History and status ==
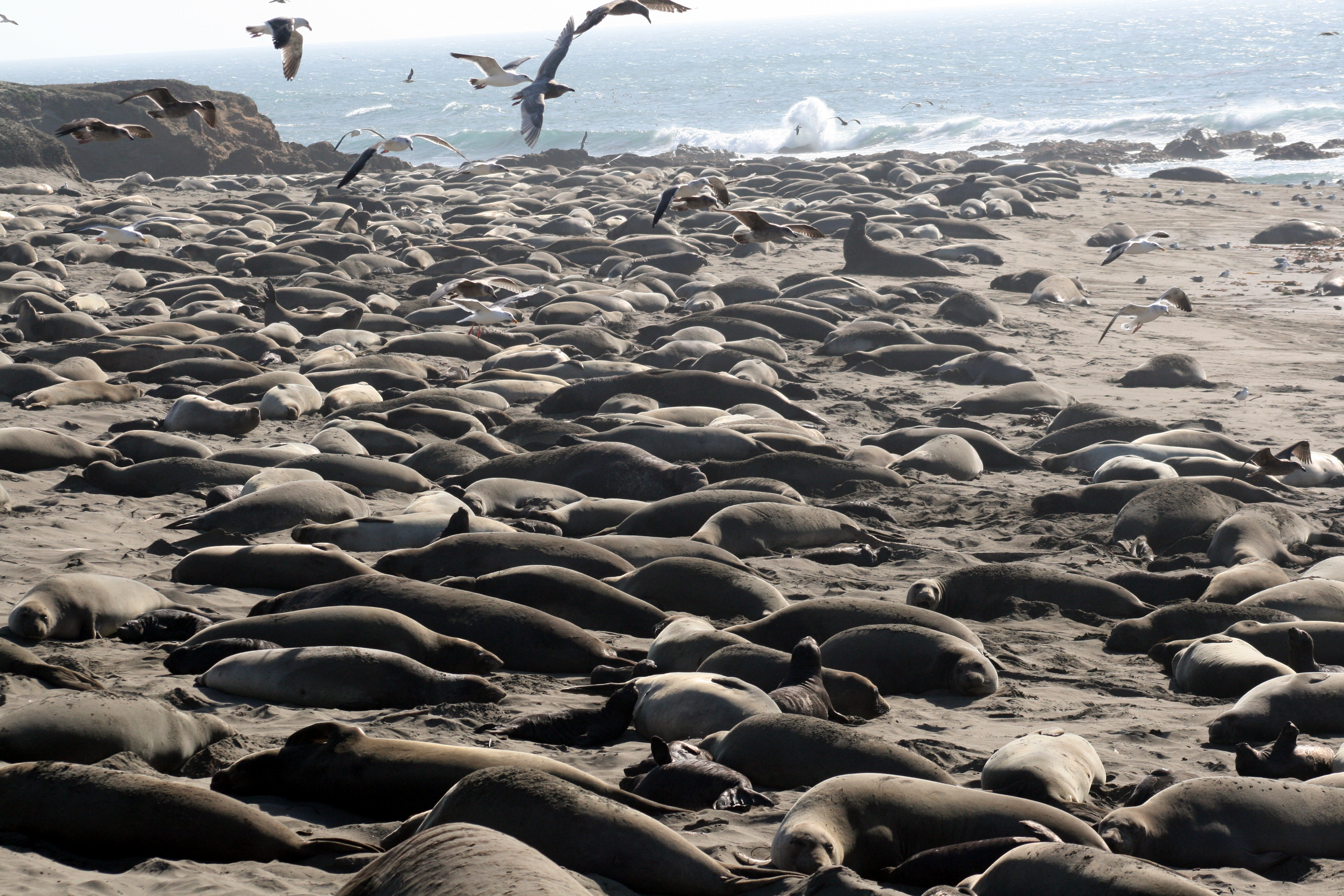
The northern elephant seal population was estimated to be 171,000 in 2005.

Beginning in the 18th century, northern elephant seals were hunted extensively, almost to extinction by the end of the 19th century, being prized for oil made from their blubber, and the population may have fallen as low as only 20–40 individuals. In 1874, Charles Melville Scammon recorded in Marine Mammals of the Northwestern Coast of America, that an 18-foot (5.5 m) long bull caught on Santa Barbara Island yielded 210 US gallons (795 L; 175 imp gal) of oil. They were thought to be extinct in 1884 until a remnant population of eight individuals was discovered on Guadalupe Island in 1892 by a Smithsonian expedition, who promptly killed several for their collections. The elephant seals managed to survive, and were finally protected by the Mexican government in 1922. Since the early 20th century, they have been protected by law in both Mexico and in the United States. Subsequently, the U.S. protection was strengthened after passage of the Marine Mammal Protection Act of 1972, and numbers have now recovered to over 200,000.

Nevertheless, a genetic bottleneck experienced by northern elephant seals during the nineteenth century made them more susceptible to disease, environmental changes and pollution. Such a small initial population of around 20–40 also meant that extensive inbreeding occurred within the species, leading to a whole other onset of issues. Issues from the bottleneck include a sharp loss of genetic diversity and increased homozygosity in the surviving population, and also a decreased number of haplogroups. In addition to this, there was also a substantial increase in the rate of asymmetry within the animals' skulls.

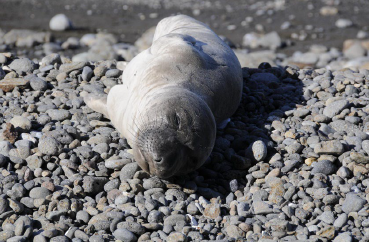
A northern elephant seal sleeps on the coast of the Channel Islands National Marine Sanctuary in California.

In California, the population is continuing to grow at around 6% per year, and new colonies are being established; they are now probably limited mostly by the availability of haul-out space. Their breeding was probably restricted to islands, before large carnivores were exterminated or prevented from reaching the side of the ocean. Numbers can be adversely affected by El Niño events and the resultant weather conditions, and the 1997–98 El Niño may have caused the loss of about 80% of that year's pups. Presently, the northern elephant seal is protected under the federal Marine Mammal Protection Act and has a fully protected status under California law (California Fish and Game Code [FGC] § 4700).

While the population is rising in the state of California, some colonies farther south are experiencing declining populations, likely due to rising sea and air temperatures. In Baja California, the two largest colonies, in Guadalupe and San Benito, have seen consistently declining numbers for the past two decades. Seeing as populations farther north are consistently increasing, it has been hypothesized that this discrepancy is due to a change in migration patterns. As sea and air temperatures rise, Northern elephant seals may not be migrating as far south as they have previously. The climate is expected to continue warming, and southern populations are expected to continue falling.

Populations of rookery sites in California have increased during the past century. At Año Nuevo State Park, for example, no individuals were observed whatsoever until 1955; the first pup born there was observed in the early 1960s. Currently, thousands of pups are born every year at Año Nuevo, on both the island and mainland. The growth of the site, Piedras Blancas, which is near San Simeon, has proved even more spectacular; no animals were there prior to 1990. The Piedras Blancas elephant seal rookery has become the largest on the mainland. Currently, the San Simeon site hosts more breeding animals than Año Nuevo State Park during winter season.

In February 2026, the first case of Highly Pathogenic Avian Influenza (H5N1) was confirmed in the species via testing of pups at Año Nuevo State Park. Researchers at the University of California, Davis, University of California, Santa Cruz, California Department of Fish and Wildlife, California Department of Public Health, and the National Oceanic and Atmospheric Administration monitored the situation, as a similar outbreak occurred within a colony of southern elephant seals in Argentina that affected a majority of the population and drastically increased mortality in a study conducted in October 2023. Año Nuevo State Park was closed to the public until April 11, 2026, when it reopened due to a decrease in mortality rates within pups.
