= Rancho Piedra Blanca =

Mexican land grant in California

Coordinates: 35.700°N 121.180°W

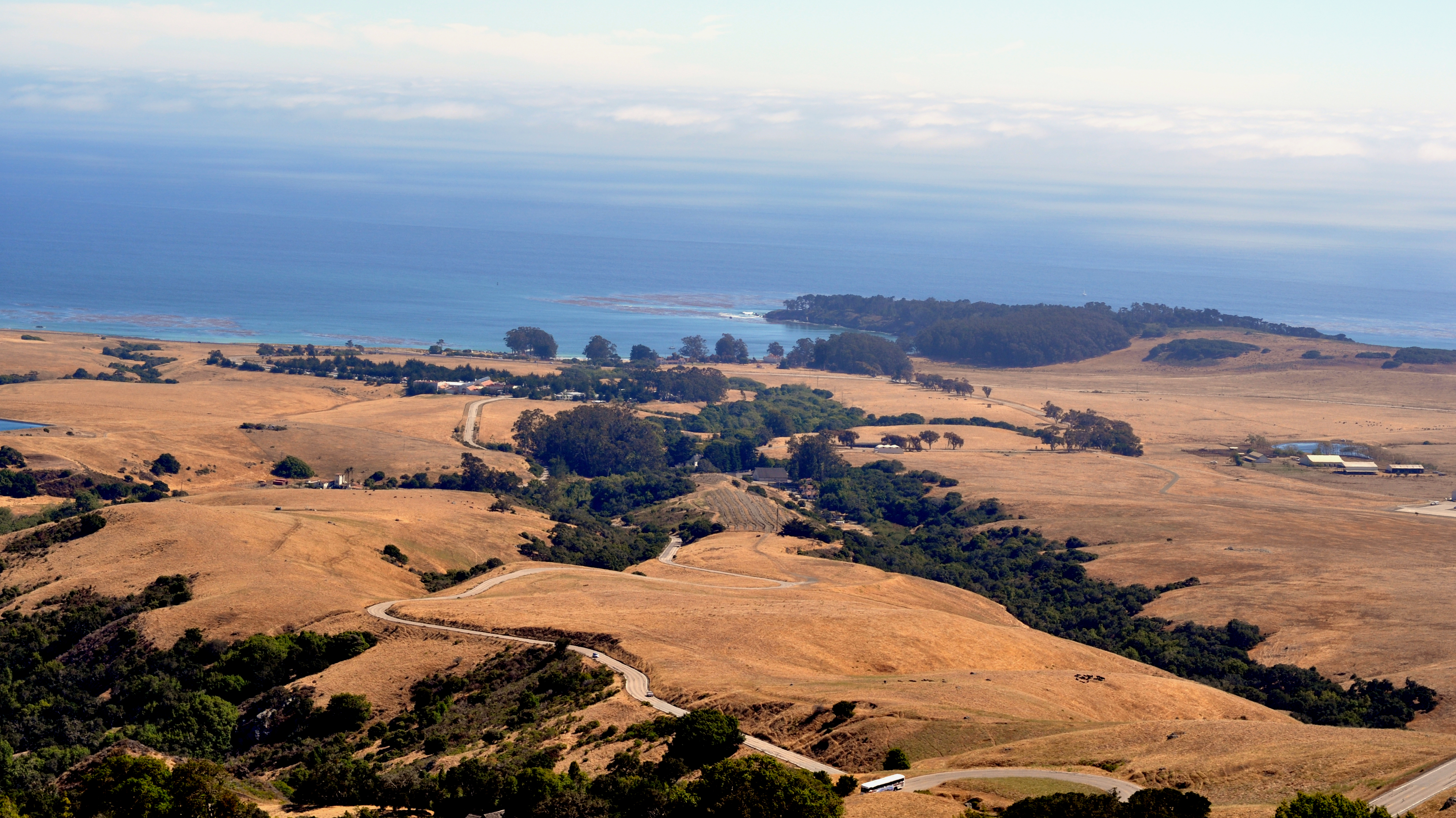
Hearst Ranch, looking down the access road from Hearst Castle to Highway 1 and San Simeon; wooded peninsula is San Simeon Point

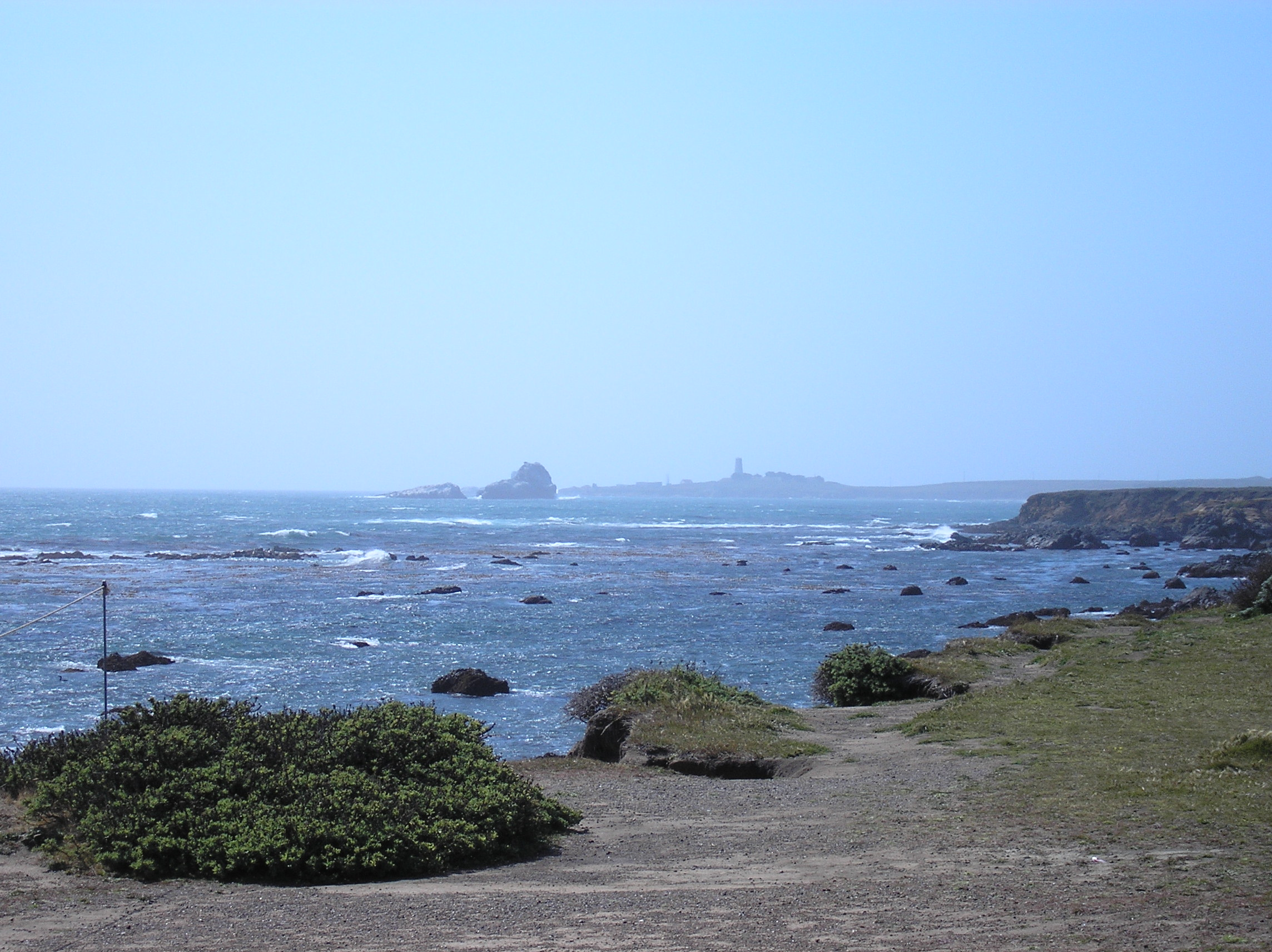
Pacific coast on the old Rancho Piedra Blanca, with Piedras Blancas Light Station in background.

Rancho Piedra Blanca was a large, 48,806-acre (197.51 km^{2}) Mexican land grant in present-day San Luis Obispo County, California, given in 1840 by Governor Juan Alvarado to José de Jesús Pico. The name means "white rock" and refers to rocks painted white by its bird population. The grant extended south along the Pacific Coast below Big Sur from Ragged Point to Pico Creek (formerly Arroyo del Pinal), where it adjoins Rancho San Simeon. The land grant includes the original townsite and post office for San Simeon, the Hearst Ranch headquarters, and Hearst Castle.

== History ==
José de Jesús Pico (1806–1892), a member of the Pico family of California (a prominent Californio family), was the son of Jose Dolores Pico and Isabel Cota. He was born in Monterey in 1806. His brother, Antonio Maria Pico, was the grantee of Rancho Pescadero. Another brother was the bandit Salomon Pico. José de Jesús Pico was a soldier, and married Francisca Zaviera Trinidad Antonia Gabriela Villavicencio (b. 1813) in 1832. Originally part of the Mission San Miguel coastal grazing land, the eleven square league Rancho Piedra Blanca was granted to Pico in 1840. In 1841 Pico was appointed administrator of Mission San Miguel.

With the cession of California to the United States following the Mexican-American War, the 1848 Treaty of Guadalupe Hidalgo provided that the land grants would be honored. As required by the Land Act of 1851, a claim for Rancho Piedra Blanca was filed with the Public Land Commission in 1852, and the grant was patented to José de Jesús Pico in 1876.

Pico sold parts of the rancho to Mariano Pacheco, Juan Castro, Peter Gillis and others. In 1865, George Hearst (1820 – 1891), a successful miner during the California Gold Rush era and later a US Senator, started to acquire land in the area. By 1865, 17,000 acres (69 km^{2}) of the rancho had already been sold, but Hearst was able to buy 30,000 acres (121 km^{2}) of Rancho Piedra Blanca from Pico. Hearst continued to buy lots whenever they became available. He also bought most of Rancho San Simeon, and part of Rancho Santa Rosa.

== Historic sites of the Rancho ==
- Piedras Blancas Light Station
- Sebastian Store, San Simeon, established 1852.
- Hearst Castle

== See also ==
- Ranchos of California
- List of Ranchos of California
- Piedras Blancas Motel, now closed
