= Rancho Llano de Buena Vista =

Former Mexican land grant in the Salinas Valley, California

Coordinates: 36.640°N 121.620°W

Rancho Llano de Buena Vista was a 8,446-acre (34.18 km^{2}) Mexican land grant in the Salinas Valley, in present-day Monterey County, California, given in 1823 by Governor Luís Antonio Argüello to José Mariano Estrada. In English, the name means "Good View Plain". The grant extended along the north bank of the Salinas River across the river from the Estrada family's Rancho Buena Vista, and up the river from Hill Town. Rancho Llano de Buena Vista encompassed present-day Spreckels.

== History ==
José Mariano Estrada (1784-), a lieutenant of the Mexican Artillery, came to California with his brother, José Raimundo Estrada (1784-), in 1797 with José Joaquín de Arrillaga. Mariano Estrada married Maria Isabel Argüello, who was the daughter of José Darío Argüello and sister of Luís Antonio Argüello. Mariano Estrada was the grantee of the twosquare league Rancho Buena Vista in 1822, and the two square league Rancho Llano de Buena Vista in 1823. Mariano Estrada was executor of the Luís Argüello estate in 1830.

José Mariano Estrada's daughter Maria Adelaida Altagracia Estrada (1811–1875) married David Spence in 1829. Scotsman David Spence (1798–1875) came to Monterey in 1824 on a vessel from Lima, Peru to work for William Hartnell. Spence was grantee of Rancho Encinal y Buena Esperanza in 1834, Alcalde of Monterey in 1839, and a member of the state legislature.

With the cession of California to the United States following the Mexican-American War, the 1848 Treaty of Guadalupe Hidalgo provided that the land grants would be honored. As required by the Land Act of 1851, a claim for Rancho Llano de Buena Vista was filed with the Public Land Commission in 1853, and the grant was patented to David Spence in 1860.

His only son, David Steward Spence (1830–1868), who married Refugio Malarin, daughter of Juan Malarin, grantee of Rancho Chualar, died in 1868, leaving three sons and a daughter, who inherited their grandfather's estate.

In 1865 Carlisle S. Abbott (1828- ) rented about 9,000 acres (36 km^{2}) of land in the area of Rancho Llano de Buena Vista and operated a dairy cattle farm. By 1875 he owned the land. He subsequently sold David Jacks.

In 1890, Claus Spreckels built his sugar beets factory on Rancho Llano de Buena Vista.

== See also ==
- Ranchos of California
- List of Ranchos of California
