= California Rangeland Trust =

US nonprofit organization

California Rangeland Trust is a conservation nonprofit organization founded in 1998. The Rangeland Trust claims to be the largest land trust in California, having conserved over 421,000 acres (1,700 km^{2}) of rangeland on 100 ranches across 26 counties.

The Rangeland Trust remains focused on the quality standards of professional practices and is a Land Trust Alliance accredited organization. In California, there are over 22 million acres (89,000 km^{2}) of privately owned rangeland. The Rangeland Trust is actively looking for funding sources for the over 400,000 acres (1,600 km^{2}) of rangeland on the waiting list.

The Rangeland Trust uses conservation easements as a tool to conserve rangeland properties. Working in close partnership with each property owner, the Rangeland Trust develops a customized legal agreement that inventories the land's agricultural, scenic, historical, and wildlife values and seeks to maintain the highest standards of animal husbandry and food production in a setting that sustains agriculture and habitat.

== History ==
Steve Sinton was the Rangeland Trust's founding chairman. A graduate of Stanford University and the University of Colorado Law School, Stinton practiced water and environmental law in Sacramento, California and San Luis Obispo County for fifteen years before retiring to operate two family cattle ranches with his father and manage several commercial buildings in the City of San Luis Obispo. The Sinton family also operates a 120-acre (0.49 km^{2}) vineyard.

== Notable ranches ==
Notable ranches in the Trust's portfolio include:

- Yolo Land & Cattle Co., Yolo County

Yolo Land & Cattle Co. placed 6,983-acre (28.26 km^{2}) into a conservation easement on March 25, 2005. This cattle ranch, located in the inner-coastal rangeland of the Blue Ridge Berryessa Natural Area, contains ponds, wetlands, streams and open spaces that provide habitat for many types of plants and wildlife.

- Ecker Ranch, Madera County

Ecker Ranch, a 1,080-acre (4.4 km^{2}) ranch is now protected by an agricultural easement.

- Tejon Ranch, Kern County

In 2000, California Rangeland Trust accepted the donation of a 1,122-acre (4.54 km^{2}) easement as mitigation for a commercial development located in the northwest corner of Tejon Ranch. As a condition of approval for the development, Tejon Ranch Company donated an easement on nearby grazing land in order to protect the habitat for the San Joaquin kit fox and blunt-nosed leopard lizard.

- Hearst Ranch, San Luis Obispo County

In 2005, the Hearst Corporation, American Land Conservancy, California Rangeland Trust, and the State of California completed a comprehensive conservation project that permanently protects the 128-square-mile (330 km^{2}) Hearst Ranch. A major component of the project is the conservation easement restricting future development on 80,000 acres (320 km^{2}). The Hearst ranch is the largest privately owned working cattle ranch remaining on the California Coast. The conservation easement ensures that the scenic, open space, agricultural and natural resource values of the ranch are preserved. California Rangeland Trust holds, monitors and enforces the conservation easement.

- San Lucas Ranch, Santa Barbara County

A conservation easement agreement was placed on December 27, 2007. Originally part of the historic Spanish land grant, Rancho Cañada de los Pinos, the owners purchased San Lucas Ranch in 1924. This donated easement on 1,534 acres (6.21 km^{2}) of the working ranch preserves a piece of California's western heritage and habitat resources. It is part of a much larger unified ecological landscape which includes scenic mountain and riparian views of the Santa Ynez Valley and the surrounding mountain ranges. A primary value of this property is the Valley Oak savannah and grasslands that once covered most of the valley.

- V6 Ranch, Fresno and Monterey Counties

In March 2001, a conservation easement protected the entire 17,000 acres (69 km^{2}) ranch of John and Zee Varian near Parkfield, California that is part of the Diablo Range Project. The property is in one of the most productive grazing regions in the state and includes significant oak woodlands and other unique and important natural values.
