= Hearst Ranch =

Two central California cattle ranches

Coordinates: 35°42′N 121°10′W

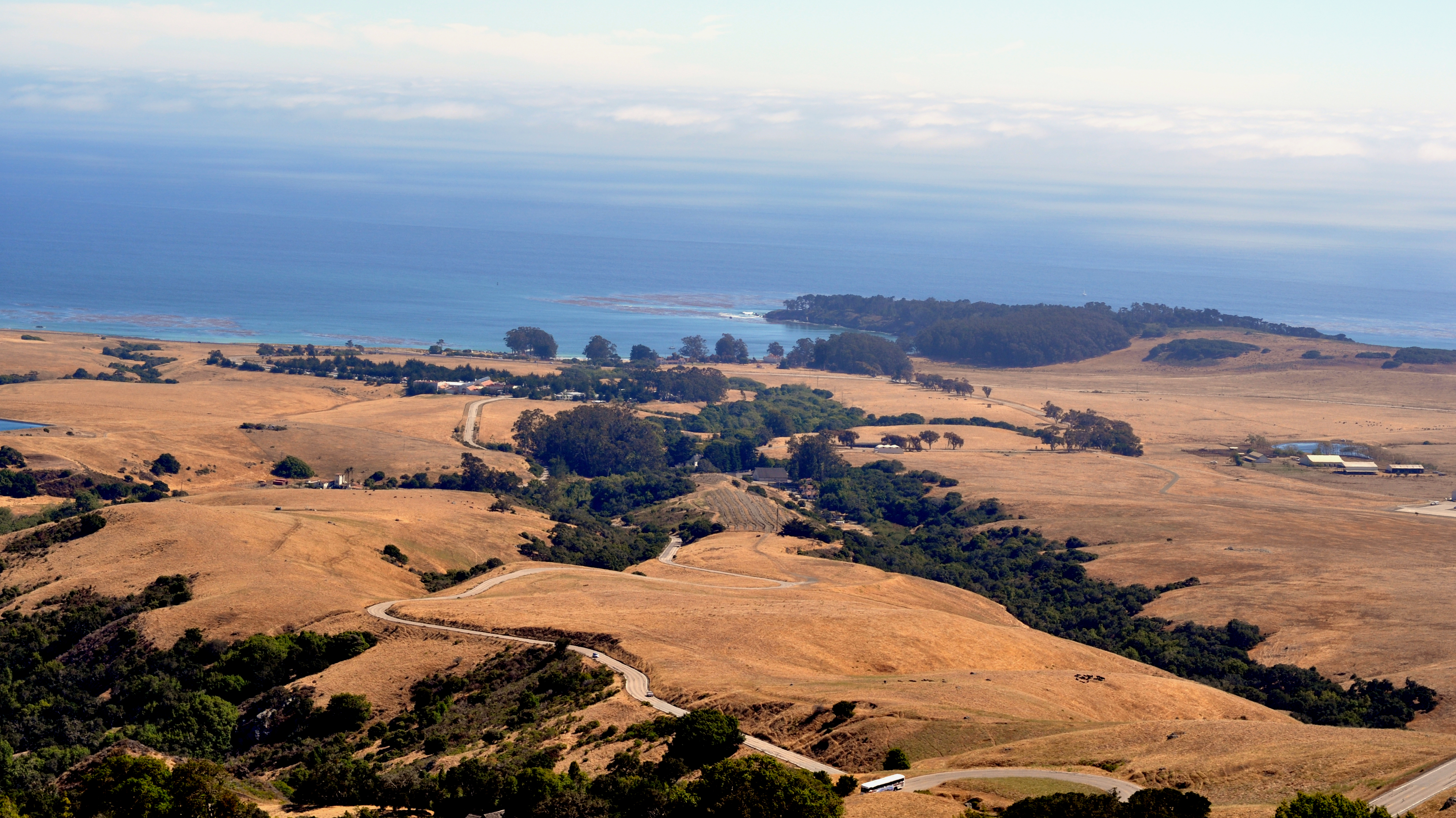
Hearst Ranch, looking down the access road from Hearst Castle to Highway 1 and San Simeon. The wooded peninsula is San Simeon Point.

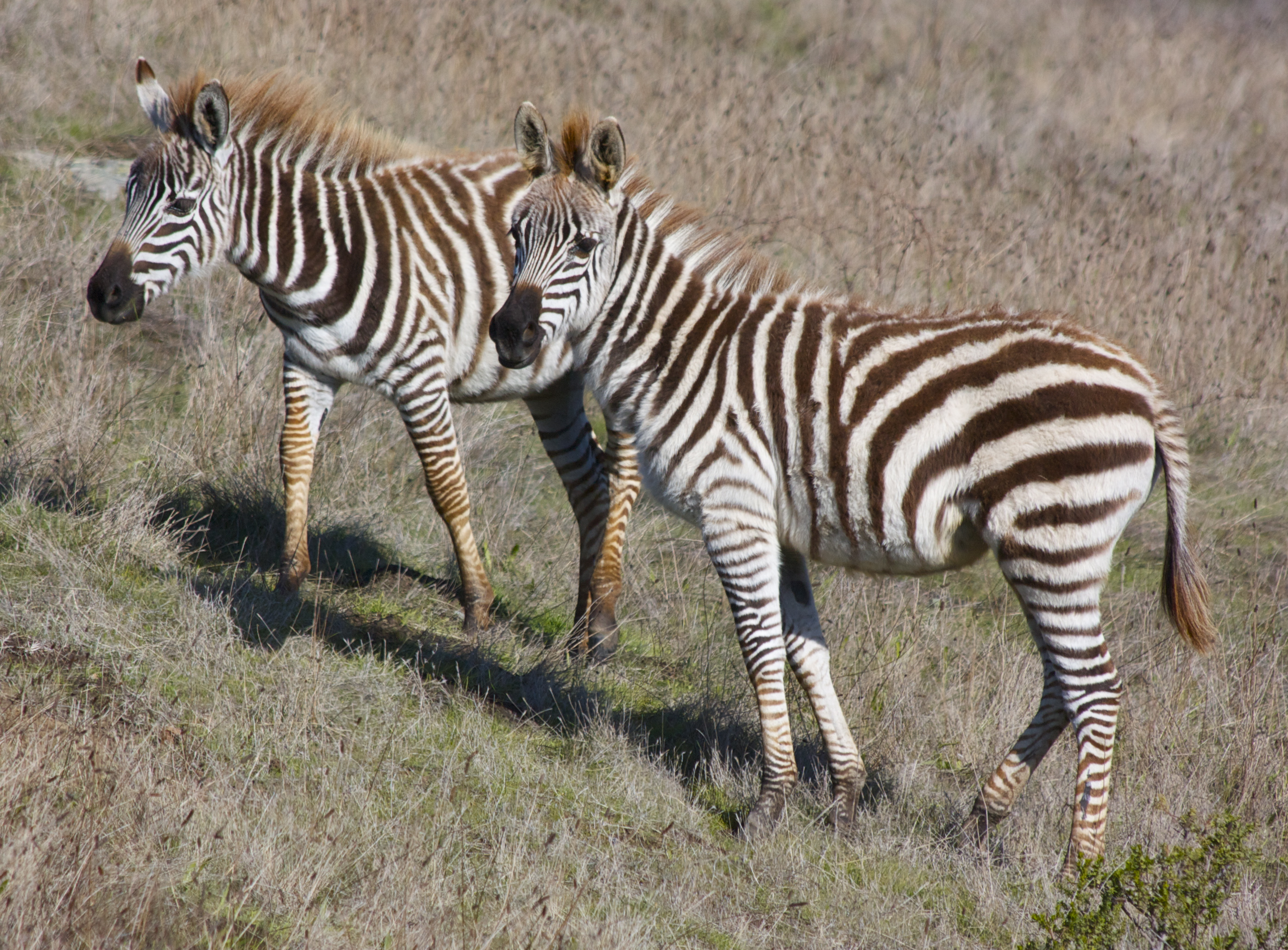
Young zebras at Hearst Ranch. Remnants of Mr. Hearst's private zoo, they are allowed to mix freely with Ranch cattle.

The Hearst Ranch is composed of two cattle ranches in central California. The best known is the original Hearst Ranch, which surrounds Hearst Castle and comprises about 80,000 acres (320 km^{2}). George Hearst (1820–1891) bought over 30,000 acres (120 km^{2}) of Rancho Piedra Blanca, an 1840 Mexican land grant, in the late 19th century. He also bought most of Rancho San Simeon, and part of Rancho Santa Rosa, two other adjacent land grants.

The other ranch is the 73,000-acre (300 km^{2}) Jack Ranch at Cholame, California, which was acquired by the Hearst Corporation in 1966. The Jack Ranch comprises most of Rancho Cholame, an 1844 land grant, plus additional lands. The ranch's Circle C brand is the oldest registered brand in use in California.

A third collection of Hearst ranches was acquired by the Army to form Fort Hunter Liggett.

== Description ==
The Hearst ranch produces branded grass-fed beef for the retail markets, selling primarily to Whole Foods in Southern California. The ranch is managed by Stephen Thompson Hearst, the great-grandson of William Randolph Hearst. The ranch is permanently protected under a conservation agreement signed in 2005 by the Hearst Corporation, American Land Conservancy, California Rangeland Trust, and the State of California.

== Airport ==
The ranch has a private airstrip, Hearst Airport. It was first constructed in 1928 or before. In 1935 or 1936 it was moved to a different location. It was moved to its third and present location in 1946. It is not open to public traffic.
