= Carpophorus =

Carpophorus is a name of Greek origin that means "fruit-bearer." It can refer to:

== People ==
- A bishop of the Archdiocese of Carthage who presided from 258?
- The owner of Pope Callixtus I when the latter was still a slave
- The priest who converted Chrysanthus of the sainted pair Chrysanthus and Daria
- Carpoforo Tencalla (1623–1685), Swiss-Italian Baroque painter
- Carpophorus, a Roman slave who fought animals in the Inaugural games of the Flavian Amphitheatre

== Places ==
- San Carpóforo Canyon, California
- San Carpoforo, church in Gabiano, Italy
- San Carpoforo, church in Como, Italy
- S. Carpoforo, parish church in Bissone, Switzerland

== Saints ==
- Carpophorus, Exanthus, Cassius, Severinus, Secundus, and Licinius (died ca. 295), Christian soldiers martyred at Como
- Rufus and Carpophorus (Carpone), martyrs of Capua
- Carpophorus is one of the Four Crowned Martyrs
- Carpophorus, priest martyred around 300 either at Spoleto or at Seville

== Other ==
- Carpophorus was an epithet of Demeter and her daughter Persephone
