= Rancho Encinal y Buena Esperanza =

Land grant in California

Coordinates: 36.600°N 121.520°W

Rancho Encinal y Buena Esperanza was a 13,392-acre (54.20 km^{2}) Mexican land grant in the Salinas Valley, in present-day Monterey County, California.

Two square leagues (Encinal) was given in 1834 by Governor José Figueroa to David Spence, and a one square league addition (Buena Esperanza) given in 1839 by Governor Juan B. Alvarado to Spence.

The three square league grant extended along the north bank of the Salinas River, and encompassed present-day Spence.

== History ==
Scotsman David Spence (1798–1875) came to Monterey in 1824 from Lima, Peru to work for William Hartnell. In 1829, Spence married Maria Adelaida Altagracia Estrada (−1875), a daughter of José Mariano Estrada, grantee of Rancho Buena Vista. Spence was Alcalde of Monterey in 1839 in Alta California, and later a member of the California state legislature.

With the cession of California to the United States following the Mexican-American War, the 1848 Treaty of Guadalupe Hidalgo provided that the land grants would be honored. As required by the Land Act of 1851, a claim for Rancho Encinal y Buena Esperanza was filed with the Public Land Commission in 1852, and the grant was patented to David Spence in 1862.

His only son, David Steward Spence (1830–1868), who married Refugio Malarin, daughter of Juan Malarin, grantee of Rancho Chualar, died in 1868, leaving three sons and a daughter, who inherited their grandfather’s estate.

== See also ==
- Ranchos of California
- List of Ranchos of California
