= Piedras Blancas Motel =

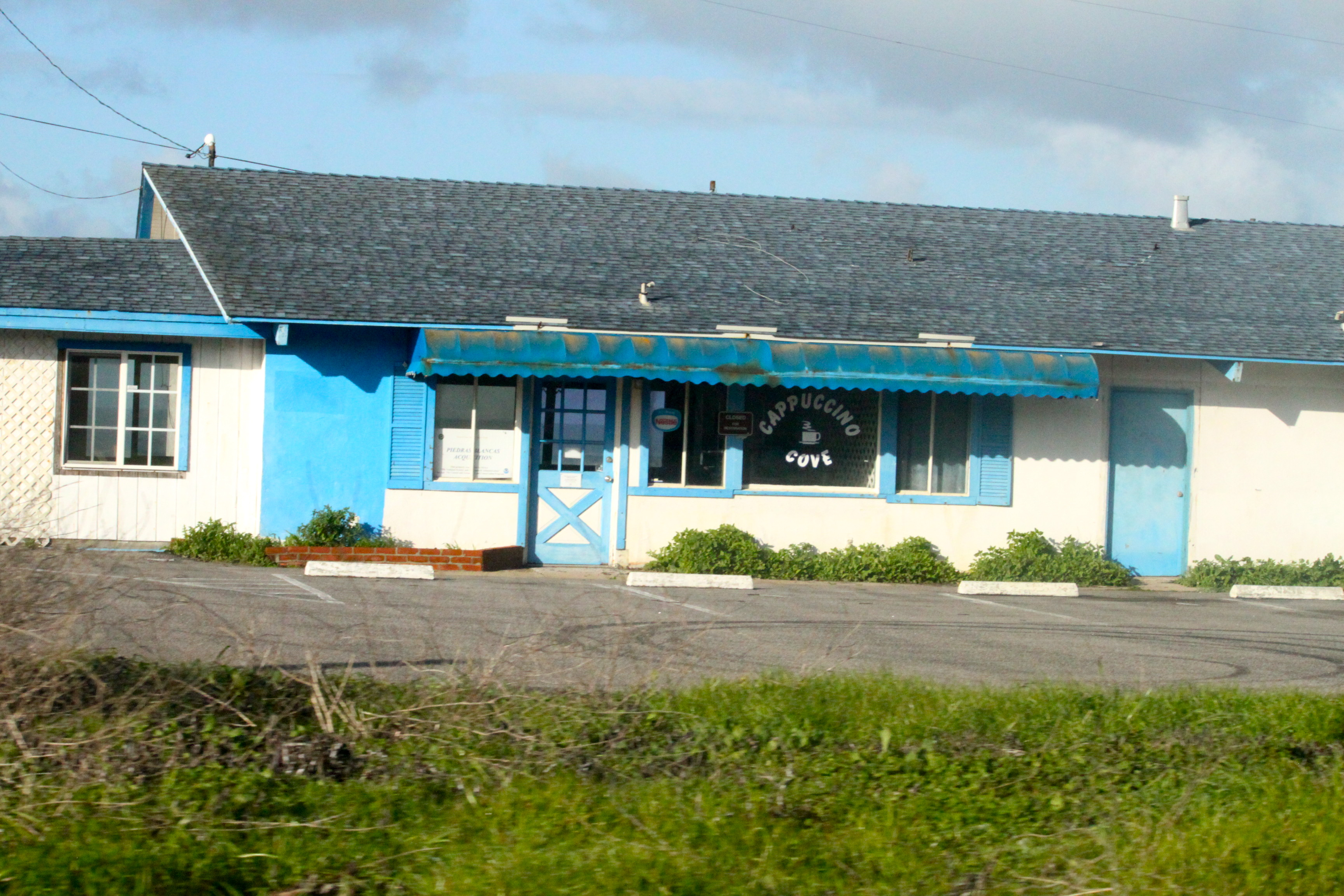
- Piedras Blancas Motel cafe, 2010
- Interactive map of the Piedras Blancas Motel area

General information
- Location: 16420 Cabrillo Highway, San Simeon, California, USA
- Coordinates: 35.68864°N 121.28842°W
- Completed: Early 1950s
- Closed: April 2005
- Owner: Hearst San Simeon State Park

Piedras Blancas Motel is a vintage roadside motel-and-diner complex located along the Central Coast of California approximately seven miles north of the historic village of San Simeon. It is a part of the Hearst San Simeon State Park, and has been considered for reuse as a campground and budget lodging.

== Characteristics ==
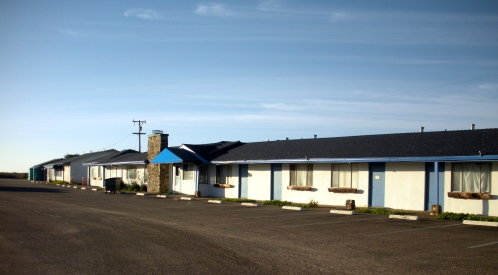
The Piedras Blancas Motel, 2010. The blue canopy marks the former office.

The property is the very last remaining ocean-front complex of its kind to exist along such a remote, wild and rural section of two-lane historic State Route 1 anywhere south of the Big Sur Coast and was the only remaining private development amid 13 miles (21 km) of coast scheduled to become parks.

=== Owners ===
It is owned by the state park system of California which has yet to respond to a variety of preservation efforts.

The property is visible on historic maps of the William Randolph Hearst holdings as being amid the 300,000 acres (1,200 km^{2}) Hearst owned for eighteen miles (29 km) along this coastline, the one tiny parcel of land he was never able to acquire from its owners.

== History ==
The exact construction date is uncertain, but the 12-room facility is known to have been built in the early 1950s, just before tourists began visiting Hearst Castle in significant numbers. The hotel served vacationing families of returning American GIs throughout that decade. It continued to serve vacationing Americans and foreign tourists, and still offered rooms for as little as $28 per night, until its closing by the Trust for Public Land and the State of California in April 2005.

Various members of the public, including locals, foreign tourists, and historians, have requested the re-opening of the motel, and in October 2005 a grass-roots citizens group—Citizens for the Preservation of the Piedras Blancas Motel—was formed to advocate for the restoration and revival of the complex as a low-cost motel for members of the public, and to plead for the protection of its buildings from the elements until such a restoration can occur.

The property had also historically served as a small RV camp site and beach, gas station, and gift store; the pumps and tanks for the gas station portion have been removed, and the private beach opened to the public. In 2007, the demolition of a motel annex which contained three suites was blamed by the State on coastal erosion. Historic Highway One and the context for the motel have also been endangered by new housing construction in the area. As of March 2008, the Piedras Blancas Motel remains physically neglected and closed to the public.

== Current uses and future plans ==
The old managers suite at the motel is currently used as a private residence, for State Park employees. State Parks is currently (Oct 2017) remodelling the south end of the motel, as part of their plans to add a new campground there. “A long-term project here is to be able to get the Piedras Blancas Motel back in shape and to get a campground,” a State Parks spokesman said in 2016. "The conceptual plans are to provide 20 to 30 drive-in campsites and 10 to 15 cabins. At full capacity, it looks like it could accommodate 40 guests," a spokesman of the California State Coastal Conservancy said. As of mid-2026, there are no signs of recent work, and the older units of the motel are increasingly dilapidated.

== See also ==
- List of motels
