= Sebastian Store =

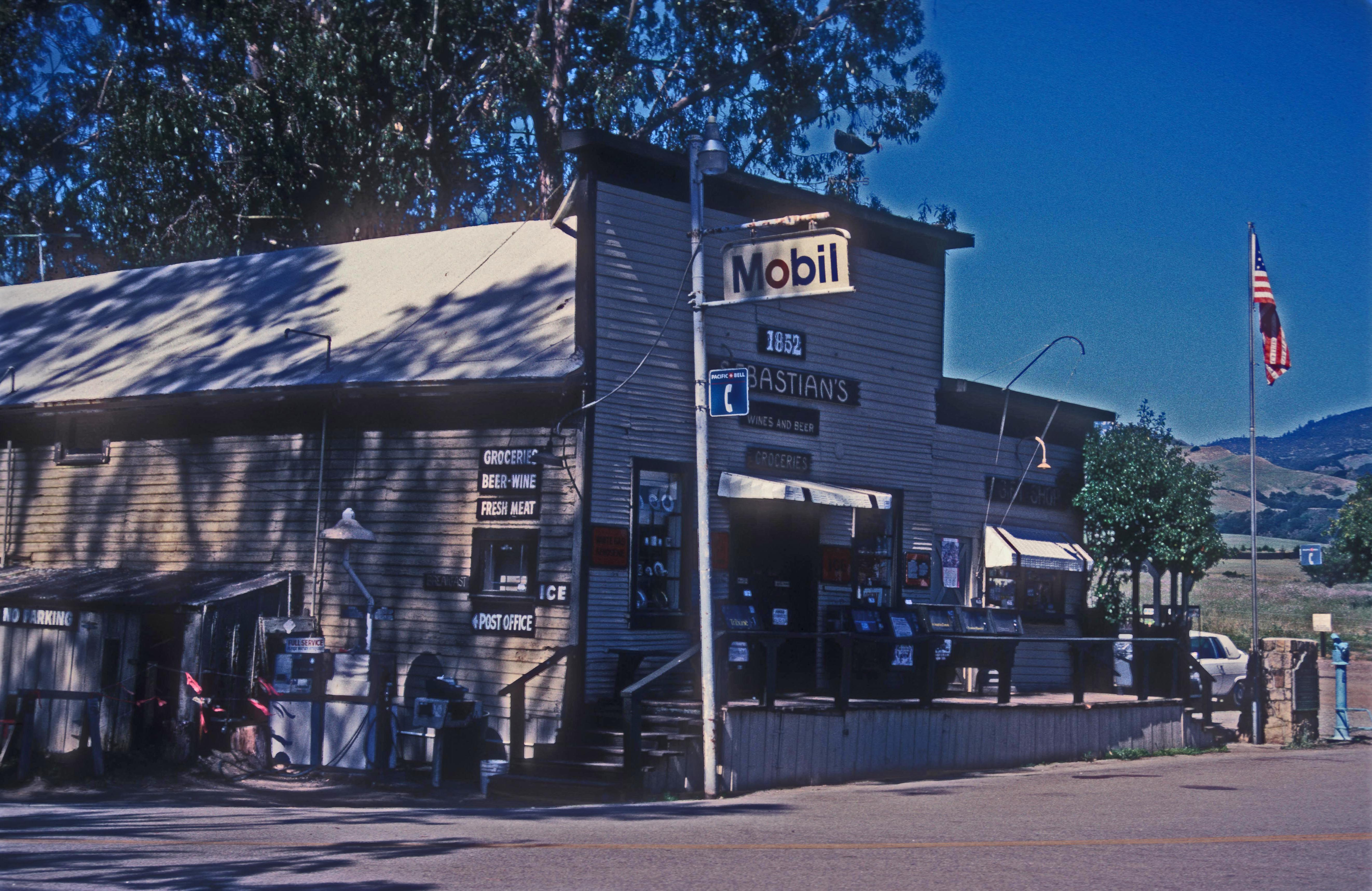
- Sebastian Store in 1989

- Location within California Location within the United States
- 35°38′36″N 121°11′29″W
- Type: Historic store
- Location: 442 San Simeon Road, San Simeon, California

History
- Built: 1860s

California Historical Landmark
- Reference no.: 726

The Sebastian Store is a California Historical Landmark (#726) in San Simeon, California, United States. It is the oldest store building along the north coast of San Luis Obispo County. It was built in the 1860s at Whaling Point, one-half mile to the west of its current location where it was moved in 1878. The Sebastian family operated the store for 94 years.

It was built in 1852 by Captain Joseph Clark (birthname Machado) to provide goods and services to whalers and the surrounding community. It was moved from the point to its present location by George Hearst and operated by the Thorndyke family until 1914. According to a 2016 article on the "Cambria History Exchange", the store was established in 1852 by Juan Castro (son-in-law of John Wilson) who owned a portion of Rancho Piedra Blanca.

Aside from the Hearst family, other prominent customers were reported to include Thomas Edison, Calvin Coolidge, George Bernard Shaw and Winston Churchill.
