= Rancho Santa Rosa (Estrada) =

Land grant in California

Coordinates: 35.540°N 121.050°W

Rancho Santa Rosa was a 13,184-acre (53.35 km^{2}) Mexican land grant in present-day San Luis Obispo County, California.

It was given in 1841 by Governor Juan Alvarado to Julian Estrada. The grant extended along the Pacific coast from San Simeon Creek on the north to the present-day town of Harmony on the south, and encompassed present-day Cambria.

== History ==
Julian Estrada (1813 – 1871), son of José Mariano Estrada, grantee of Rancho Buena Vista, was born in Monterey. Originally part of the Mission San Miguel coastal grazing land, the three square league Rancho Santa Rosa was granted to Julian Estrada in 1841. In 1842, Julian Estrada married Nicolasa Gajiola (1820-1890). Estrada was elected San Luis Obispo county supervisor in 1860 and 1861. His brother, José Ramón Estrada, was granted Rancho San Simeon and Rancho El Toro.

With the cession of California to the United States following the Mexican-American War, the 1848 Treaty of Guadalupe Hidalgo provided that the land grants would be honored. As required by the Land Act of 1851, a claim for Rancho Santa Rosa was filed with the Public Land Commission in 1852, and the grant was patented to Julian Estrada in 1865.

In 1858, Estrada mortgaged the rancho to Domingo Pujol, a Spanish born San Francisco lawyer. When Estrada could not pay the debt in 1862, Pujol took possession of the rancho except for 1,500 acres (6.1 km^{2}) occupied by Estrada. Pujol sub-divided the land and sold it in lots, including for the founding of the town of Cambria.

=== Hearst Ranch ===
In 1865, George Hearst (1820 – 1891), a successful miner during the California Gold Rush era, father of William Randolph Hearst, and later a U.S. Senator, started to acquire land in the area. His first step was to buy most of Rancho Piedra Blanca and Rancho San Simeon. In 1865, Hearst bought all Rancho Santa Rosa except 160 acres (0.6 km^{2}) from Estrada. However Estrada did not have the right to sell this land, as Pujol was in the process of foreclosing on it. Hearst sued, but ended up with only 1,340 acres (5.4 km^{2}) of Estrada's holdings. When Estrada died in 1871, his son, Francisco, took over the management of his remaining 160 acres (0.6 km^{2}).

When they left in 1876, they sold their remaining 160 acres (0.6 km^{2}) to Hearst.

== See also ==
- Ranchos of San Luis Obispo County, California
- Ranchos of California
- List of Ranchos of California
