= San Carpóforo Canyon =

Landform in Monterey County, California

Coordinates: 35.7647°N 121.3247°W

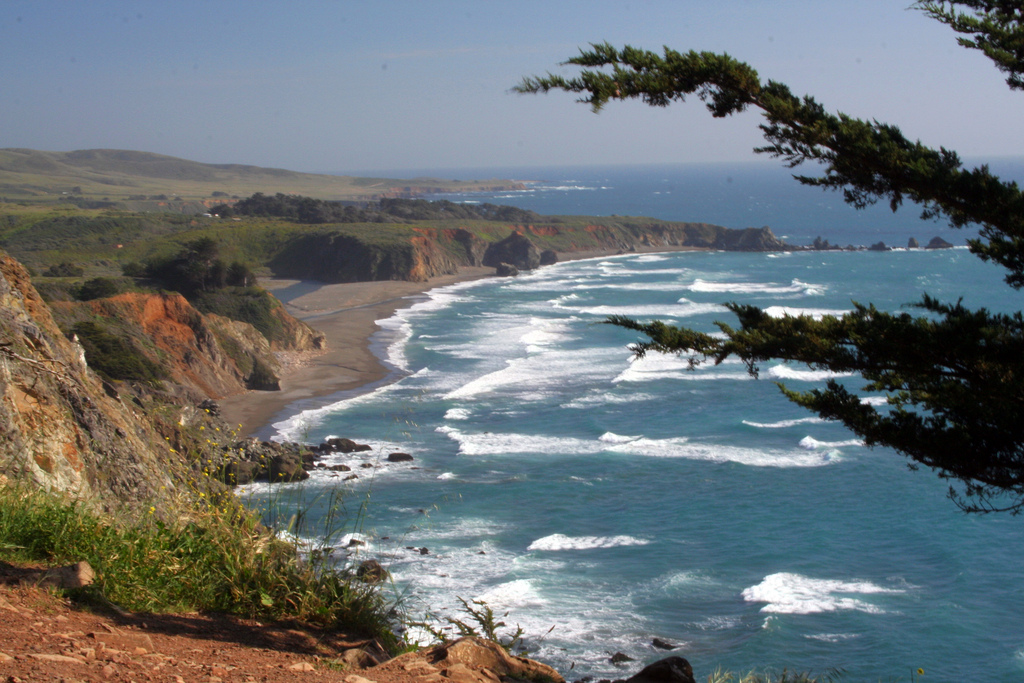
Bay at the mouth of San Carpoforo Creek, looking south from an overlook off SR 1. Ragged Point is the south boundary of the bay.

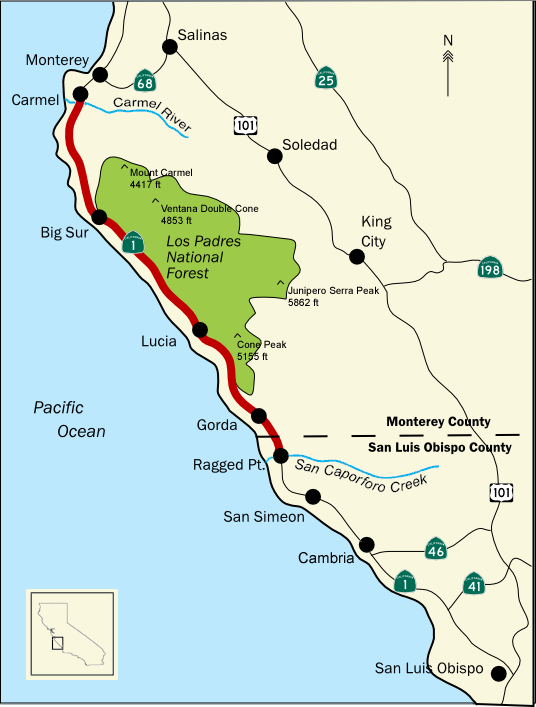
Big Sur

San Carpóforo Creek flows through San Carpóforo Canyon and into the Pacific Ocean in a small bay 20 miles (32 km) north of San Simeon on the Central Coast of California. The creek is generally considered to be the southern border of the Big Sur region of Central California.

== History ==
The first Europeans to visit the canyon was an expedition led by Gaspar de Portola on September 13, 1769. They rested for two days at the foot of the mountain range which at this point is very high and terminates in the sea. He was charged with exploring California and finding the city of Monterey. While camping there, they were visited by six indigenous people who offered pinole and fish and received beads in exchange. The Spanish sent scouts north and east. They found the Santa Lucia Mountains to the north were too rugged and blocked them from proceeding north. They decided to turn east where they thought they saw a break in the mountains and were forced to "make a road with a crowbar and pickaxe".

== Etymology ==
The canyon and creek are named after Saint Carpophorus, an early Roman martyr.

There is a trail and coastal access point just north of the bridge over the creek on State Route 1 (SR 1). In the early 20th century, the canyon was nicknamed "Sankypoky" by the locals, which is a variant of the Spanish name. Another variant was "San Carpojo"—tradition holds that someone at the Williams Ranch, which is situated at the mouth of the creek, could not pronounce "Carpóforo" and changed it to "Carpojo".
