= Rancho Cañada de los Pinos =

Land grant in California

Coordinates: 34.640°N 120.050°W

Rancho Cañada de los Pinos or College Rancho was a 35,499-acre (143.66 km^{2}) Mexican land grant in present-day Santa Barbara County, California. The grant extended along the north bank of the Santa Ynez River opposite Rancho Lomas de la Purificacion and encompassed Mission Santa Inés and present-day Santa Ynez, in the Santa Ynez Valley.

== History ==
The six square league Rancho Canada de los Pinos or College Rancho was given to the Seminary of Santa Inez, and remained in the hands of the Catholic Church after the secularization of the missions.

With the cession of California to the United States following the Mexican–American War, the 1848 Treaty of Guadalupe Hidalgo provided that the land grants would be honored. In 1853 Archbishop Joseph Sadoc Alemany filed petitions for the return of all former mission lands in the state. As required by the Land Act of 1851, a claim for Rancho Cañada de los Pinos was filed with the Public Land Commission in 1853, and the grant was patented to Bishop J. S. Alemany in 1861.

== See also ==
- Ranchos of California
- List of Ranchos of California
- California Rangeland Trust
