= Rancho Lomas de la Purificacion =

Land grant in California

Coordinates: 34.580°N 120.030°W

Rancho Lomas de la Purificacion was a 13,341-acre (53.99 km^{2}) Mexican land grant in present-day Santa Barbara County, California given in 1844 by Governor Manuel Micheltorena to Agustín Janssens. The name refers to the hills of Mission La Purísima Concepción. The grant extended between the Santa Ynez Mountains and the south bank of the Santa Ynez River opposite Rancho Cañada de los Pinos, and south east of Mission Santa Inés and present day Santa Ynez, in the Santa Ynez Valley.

== History ==
Victor Eugene Agustin Janssens (1817–1894), born in Belgium, came to California from Mexico with the Híjar-Padrés Colony expedition in 1834. In 1842, he married Maria Antonia Pico, the daughter of Jose Vicente Pico (1797-1863), major domo at Mission San Buenaventura and one of the grantees of Rancho El Rio de Santa Clara o la Colonia. Janssens was granted the three square league Rancho Lomas de la Purificacion in 1844, where he lived with his family until 1856, when he moved to Santa Barbara.

With the cession of California to the United States following the Mexican-American War, the 1848 Treaty of Guadalupe Hidalgo provided that the land grants would be honored. As required by the Land Act of 1851, a claim for Rancho Lomas de la Purificacion was filed with the Public Land Commission in 1852, and the grant was patented to Agustín Janssens in 1871.

Thomas W. Moore bought Rancho Lomas de la Purificacion in 1859. Thomas W. Moore (1819-1881), born in Ireland, came to California 1849, and to Santa Barbara in 1855. He opened a store and rented Rancho Cañada de Salsipuedes for some years. In 1859 he purchased Rancho Lomas de la Purificacion, which he made his home until he built a residence in the city of Santa Barbara.
