= Ecker Ranch =

Coordinates: 37°13′37″N 119°40′03″W

Ecker Ranch is a 1,080-acre (4.4 km^{2}) ranch in Madera County, California near Yosemite National Park. In 2009 it was listed as one of about 30 historic ranches in California that have been preserved under the auspices of the California Rangeland Trust.

It was a homesteaded ranch that has stayed in the same family since the 19th century. It is still a working ranch, that also serves as a hunting lodge and offers camping experiences for youth groups.

The ranch dates from 1870. It was more than 4,500 acres (18 km^{2}) in size. Much of the surrounding area has been developed.

The founder came to California from the Alsace-Lorraine region.

Overstreet was paid $3,000,000 for the agricultural easement, far less than what the property could have sold for with no restrictions.
