= Rancho San Simeon =

Land grant in California

Coordinates: 35.620°N 121.100°W

Rancho San Simeon was a 4,469-acre (18.09 km^{2}) Mexican land grant in present-day San Luis Obispo County, California given in 1842 by Governor Juan Alvarado to José Ramón Estrada. The grant extended along the Pacific Coast from Rancho Piedra Blanca at Pico Creek, south along the coast to San Simeon Creek, and includes the present-day townsite of San Simeon Acres.

== History ==
José Ramón Estrada (1811–1845), son of José Mariano Estrada, grantee of Rancho Buena Vista, was born in Monterey. Ramón Estrada was administrator of Mission Santa Clara in 1835 and grantee of Rancho El Toro in 1835. He married Maria Gregoria Castro. He was Alcalde of Monterey in 1836 and prefect of the first district at Monterey 1841–1843. His brother Julian Estrada was granted Rancho Santa Rosa. Originally part of the Mission San Miguel coastal grazing land, the one square league Rancho San Simeon was granted to Estrada in 1842.

Shortly before his death in 1845, Estrada sold Rancho San Simeon to José Miguel Gomez, a Mexican priest.

With the cession of California to the United States following the Mexican-American War, the 1848 Treaty of Guadalupe Hidalgo provided that the land grants would be honored. As required by the Land Act of 1851, a claim for Rancho San Simeon was filed with the Public Land Commission in 1852, and the grant was patented to José Miguel Gomez in 1865.

In 1865, George Hearst (1820–1891), a successful miner during the California Gold Rush era and later a US senator, started to acquire land in the area. His first step was to buy most of Rancho Piedra Blanca and part of Rancho Santa Rosa. In 1867, Hearst bought Rancho San Simeon. The property later passed on to his son William Randolph Hearst. It remains part of the Hearst Ranch.

== See also ==
- Ranchos of California
- List of Ranchos of California
- Hearst San Simeon State Park is partly on Rancho San Simeon
