= Yolo Land & Cattle Co. =

Company based in the state of California, United States

Yolo Land & Cattle Co. is located in Yolo County, California, west of Woodland, California, and near the Blue Ridge Mountains of the California Coast Range. This award winning cattle ranch has been operated by the Stone Family since 1976. Their cow-calf operation consists of 700 Black Angus and Hereford/Angus cows. The ranch also provides a rustic, rural venue for special events such as weddings, meetings, parties and agricultural group tours.

== Description ==
=== History ===
The Stone family has been in cattle ranching since 1976. Henry Stone started the business, which grew into a three-way partnership with his sons Scott and Casey. The Stone family is active in many agriculture and beef industry organizations such as California Rangeland Trust, National Cattlemen's Beef Association, and California Cattlemen's Association.

=== Conservation and Stewardship ===
On March 25, 2005, Yolo Land & Cattle Co. placed approximately 6,983 acres into a conservation easement held by California Rangeland Trust, making it the largest conservation easement in Yolo County. The ranch is part of the Blue Ridge Berryessa Natural Area and provides considerable habitat for native plants and wildlife. The conservation agreement will protect the land against development while allowing cattle ranching and innovative stewardship practices to continue.

Yolo Land & Cattle Co. won the 2007 National Environmental Stewardship Award presented by the National Cattlemen's Beef Association (NCBA). The award recognizes outstanding stewardship practices and commitment to improving the grazing ecosystem.

=== Marketing and Distribution ===
Yolo Land & Cattle Co. sells their grass-fed beef and beef jerky through their website and also sells their beef jerky at many stores in northern California.

=== Event Venue ===
The ranch hosted the Warrior Dash Race in 2013. This competition was a mud run obstacle course of 3.43 miles.
