= American Land Conservancy =

- Type: Incentive
- Industry: Professional Organization
- Founded: 1990; United States
- Headquarters: California, United States

The American Land Conservancy was an American non-profit organization whose goal was to protect the natural environment.

== About the American Land Conservancy ==
American Land Conservancy was a non-profit land conservation organization dedicated to protecting America's natural heritage by conserving land for the benefit of people and wildlife. Since its founding in 1990, American Land Conservancy has conserved more than 276,000 acres (1,120 km^{2}) of land and water resources, working farms and ranches, and wildlife habitats nationwide. The Conservancy was dissolved in 2016.

== Programs ==
In its first 15 years, American Land Conservancy pursued projects based on the opportunities at-hand, tackling projects across the country. Their work then transitioned to the following regional landscape programs:

- Alaska
- California Central Valley and Foothills
- Great Basin
- Mississippi River
- West Coast Trail
- American Landscapes

=== Conservation ethic ===
The organization's conservation ethic included the following principles:

- We seek to foster healthy ecosystems by preserving biological diversity and protecting habitats.
- We believe people need open space to connect to nature and recharge.
- We understand that healthy ecosystems are essential to sustainable economies and communities.
- We believe in conserving working farms and ranches to sustain historic landscapes and a way of life.
- We consider collaboration to be critical to the future of land conservation in America.
- We believe that private landowners can often serve as the best stewards of land.

== Conservation services ==
Direct Purchase – American Land Conservancy worked with landowners who wish to sell or donate their land for conservation by finding a public agency or conservation buyer to own and manage the land permanently. Funding for acquisition can come from state or federal appropriations, philanthropic foundations or individuals. Sample projects include the BK Leach Memorial Conservation Area in Missouri, Crow Creek Falls in Montana, and High Meadows in Nevada.

Conservation Easement – A conservation easement is a legal agreement between a landowner and a land trust or government agency that permanently limits uses of the land in order to protect its conservation values. It allows the landowner to continue to own and use the land and sell it or pass it on to heirs subject to the restrictions of the easement. The American Land Conservancy often worked with a conservation partner who holds and monitors the easement. Sample projects include the Hearst Ranch in California (in conjunction with the California Rangeland Trust) and Bridgeport Valley in California, and Kaskaskia Island in Illinois.

Acquisition of Surface or Sub-surface Rights - Sometimes the surface of a landscape is protected, but a company or individual owns the assets on top (timber), or underneath the surface (mining, water, natural gas). The American Land Conservancy acquired these rights to prevent development and habitat destruction in pivotal landscapes. Sample projects include Bodie State Historic Park in California, Denali National Park in Alaska, and Valley Grande in New Mexico.

== History ==
The genesis of American Land Conservancy can be traced to founder Harriet Burgess's first trip down the Grand Canyon. She found the trip guide, Martin Litton, inspiring.

Many years later, Burgess and Litton started the American Land Conservancy in order to pursue the protection of another canyon – Topanga Canyon in the Santa Monica Mountains of Southern California.

The American Land Conservancy's mission was to fill a niche in the land preservation movement, taking on projects too large for purchase by local land trusts and too complicated and high-risk for larger, national land trusts. Some of the American Land Conservancy's projects included the acquisition of tens of thousands of acres for the Humboldt-Toiyabe National Forest in California and Nevada, large-scale wetlands restoration along the Mississippi River, and conservation of the 82,000-acre (330 km^{2}) Hearst Ranch on the California Central Coast.

The organization was dissolved in 2016. Harriet Burgess had retired eight years earlier, and without succession planning sufficient to fill her shoes, the organization had foundered.
