= Rancho Las Palmas =

Historic house in California, United States

- U.S. National Register of Historic Places
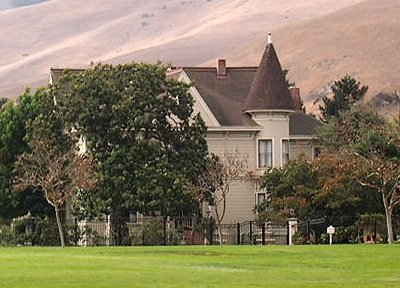
- Rancho Las Palmas

- Location of Krough House in California
- Location: 100 River Road, Salinas, California
- Coordinates: 36°40′36″N 121°39′36″W
- Area: 1,630-acre (6.6 km^{2})
- Built: 1891
- Architect: Carlton Bassett
- Architectural style: Queen Anne
- Restored: 2007
- Restored by: John Larsen & Sons
- Website: www.chateau-coralini.com
- NRHP reference No.: 78000722
- Added to NRHP: January 18, 1982

Rancho Las Palmas also known as the Hiram Corey house, is a historic Queen Anne style house located at 100 River Road, Salinas, California. It was built by Hiram Corey in 1891, one of Monterey County's most successful stock farmers of the late 19th century. The house was listed on the National Register of Historic Places on January 4, 1978, as Rancho Las Palmas. Today, the historic mansion is located in a gated residential community named Las Palmas Ranch and was renamed Chateau Coralini, which is open to the public as a boutique inn.

== History ==
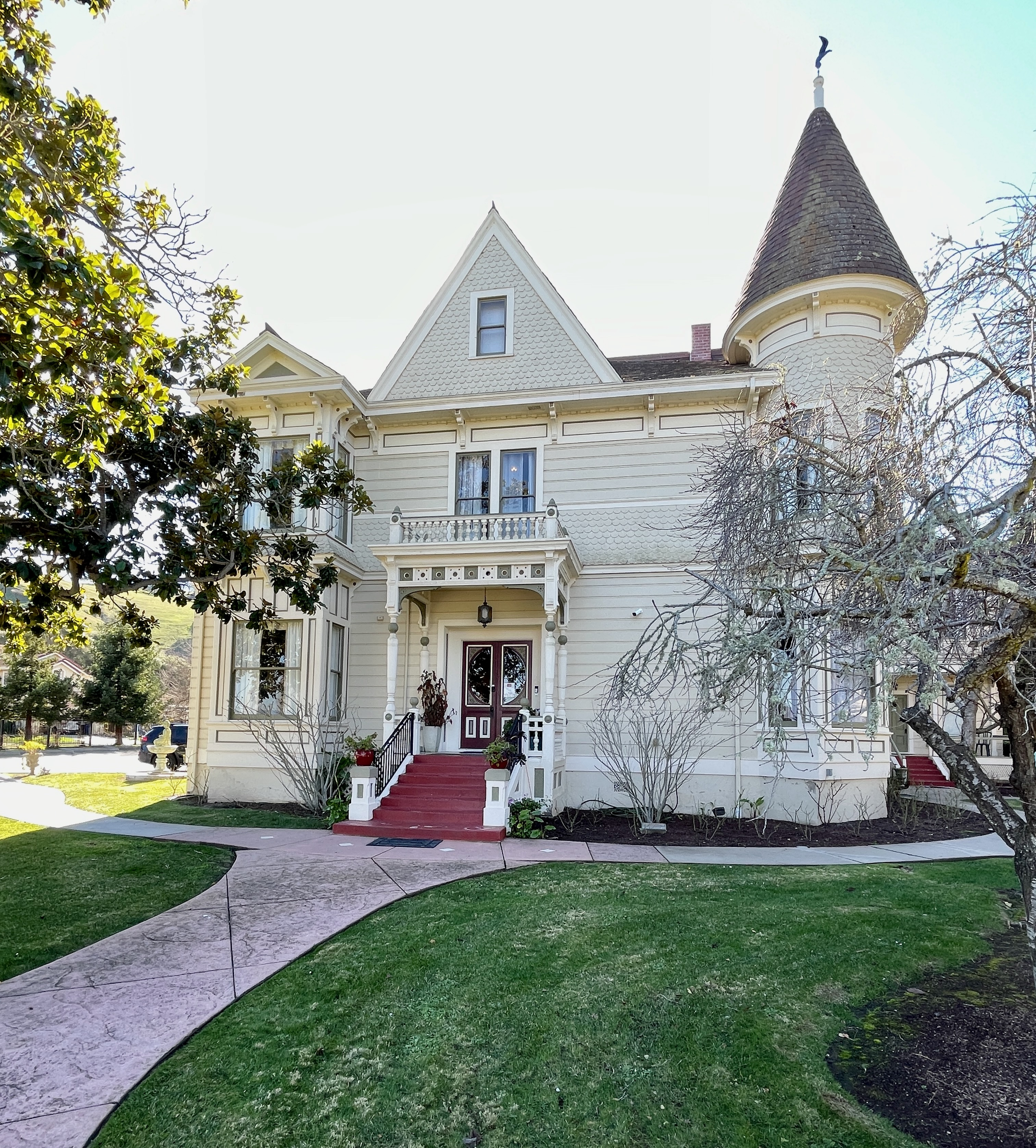
Chateau Coralini (also known as Rancho Las Palmas or Hiram Corey house)

The Rancho Las Palmas estate was part of the original 8,446-acre (34.18 km^{2}) Rancho Buena Vista, Spanish land concession in the Salinas Valley, in present day Monterey County, California that was given in 1795 to José Maria Soberanes (1753-1803) and Joaquin Castro.

In 1872, Hiram Corey leased 7,772-acre (31.45 km^{2}) of Rancho Buena Vista, keeping 450 to 500 cows on the ranch. He purchased the property in 1882. The ranch became known as one of the best dairy farms in California. In 1889, he sold the land to the Buena Vista Land Company and took his family to Europe. While traveling in Europe in 1889, Corey's wife fell in love with Chateau Versailles and wanted her home in Salinas to be her own chateau. In 1891, on his return to the United States, he purchased 1,630-acre (6.6 km^{2}) of Rancho Buena Vista, renaming the property Rancho Las Palmas. He went into horse breading, specializing in draft horses and roadsters.

Hiram Corey and his wife designed and built the Rancho Las Palmas 20-room mansion for his family in 1891, with the assistance of Salinas architect, and Corey's nephew, Carlton Bassett, for $4,000 (equivalent to $143,333 in 2025). He originally operated the land as a stock ranch. It was known as one of the best beef and dairy ranches in the state of California. His wife furnished the home with fine antiques and artwork.

Its surroundings are picturesque and residence grand in its architectural proportions, substantial in construction and elegant in arrangement, both within and without.

— Corey's biographer

The Hiram Corey mansion is a three-story, wood-frame, single-family residence built in a Queen Anne style. It is the best example of Queen Anne style of architecture in a rural setting in Monterey County. It has redwood siding, banded with fish-scale shingles halfway into the second story, with a hipped roof and tower with a brass eagle finial detail. Full bay windows can be seen on the first and second stories. The main entrance to the house has stairs leading up to double wood doors with a Queen Anne style wood railing and canopy. Some of the original palm trees line the entrance. A small one story carriage house remains at the rear of the house.

== Legacy ==
After Corey died in 1913, his second wife, Frances, inherited the deed of conveyance on the real and personal property that was worth approximately $200,000 (equivalent to $6,515,152 in 2025). She sold Rancho Las Palmas to Joe Violini in 1918, who in 1943 passed it to his four children. Frances moved to Palo Alto with her children.

In 1918, two bags of gold coins exchanged hands when Joe Violini, a Swiss immigrant, bought the Rancho Las Palmas Victorian estate and the 1,600 acre Las Palmas Ranch. The Violini family ran the ranch as a self-contained dairy farm where they also had hundreds of chickens, cured their own bacon, and ham from the hogs they raised, milked the cows, canned the fruit, and baled the hay. Mrs. Violini would bake bread while the children crushed grapes from their family vines in their bare feet.

— Chateau Coralini

In 1979, the Violini family sold the property to the Las Palmas Ranch Venture which began the process to subdivide the land for future development. In 1988, the title again changed hands and it was acquired by the Las Palmas Property Development Company, which completed the subdivision. During this time the Corey House was used as a sales office for the Las Palmas Development Company.

In May 2003, the historic Corey House mansion was bought by Samuel and Linda Persall and converted to a bed and breakfast inn. They renamed it to Chateau Coralini Retreat and Spa. The Persalls had the house and property restored by John Larsen & Sons in 2007. The restoration involved removing all the interior floors, walls, and ceilings and adding new walls, insulation, heating and air, plumbing (installing 12 bathrooms), alarm and sprinkler systems. The wood casings, originals doors, hinge and iron hardware, plaster medallions and corbels, staircase banister, fireplace tilework, and original stained glass were restored. The name Chateau Coralini was created by the Persalls to honor the Coreys and Violinis who once lived in the mansion. A children's dollhouse, built by the Las Palmas Development Company, was purchased by the Persalls and brought to the estate.

== See also ==
- National Register of Historic Places listings in Monterey County, California
