= Ragged Point (California) =

Headland in California

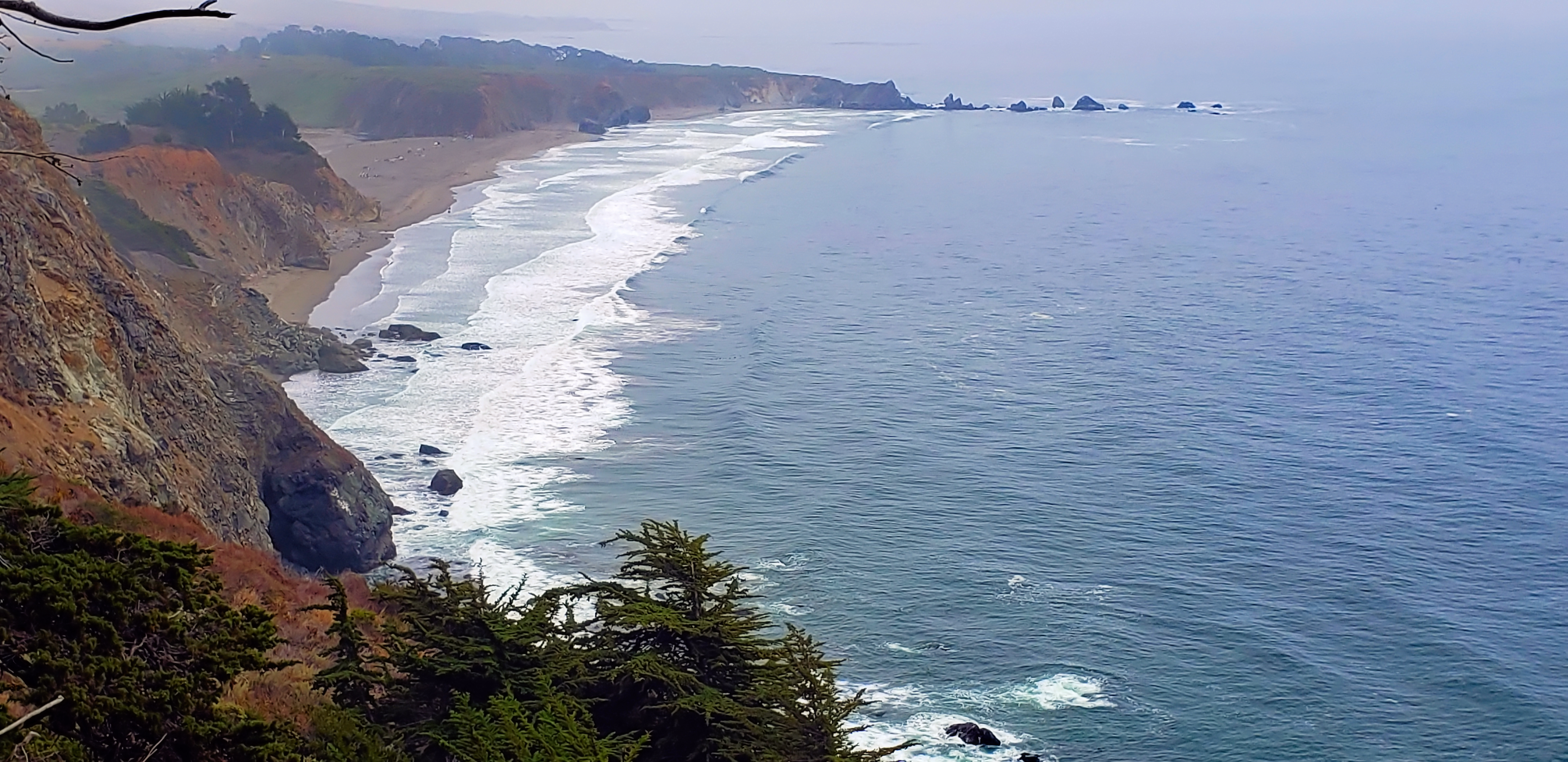
Ragged Point seen from scenic overlook on Highway 1.

Ragged Point is a headland on California's Central Coast. It is traditionally considered the southern southern end of the Big Sur coast, located in northern San Luis Obispo County along CA Hwy 1. The Ragged Point Inn and Resort is located just north of Ragged Point itself on a clifftop with dramatic views of the Big Sur coast and southward toward San Simeon and, as with much of Big Sur, features seaside cliffs, beaches, and hiking trails.

== Description ==
Ragged Point is located in northwestern San Luis Obispo County at 35°45′35″N 121°19′40″W, about 7 miles (11 km) north of the Piedras Blancas Light Station. The rocky headland marks the southern end of the small bay where San Carpoforo Creek empties into the Pacific Ocean. There is a short beach just north of the outcropping called Ragged Point Beach, which is separated by a rock from the San Carpoforo Creek Beach and the San Carpoforo Creek Trail. The area around Ragged Point is home to various forms of wildlife, including elephant seals, sea otters, and birds such as the Western snowy plover. As is common along the Big Sur coast, weather can shift quickly from hot sun to dense fog, influenced by the mountains meeting the cold waters of the North Pacific's California Current.

The area is home to the Ragged Point Inn and Resort, which is not located at the Ragged Point headland proper, but rather 1.8 miles (2.9 km) north on Highway 1 in a small hamlet also called Ragged Point. The resort was built by Wiley and Mildred Ramey starting in the late 1950s on property that was formerly part of the Hearst Ranch. The modern resort includes a hotel, restaurant, and wedding facilities, and it provides access to Young Creek Beach, a black sand beach accessible by a steep hike down a 400-foot (120 m) cliff.

As the Ragged Point area is the furthest southern reach of the Big Sur coast, many tourists and visitors stay in San Luis Obispo County towns like San Simeon or Cambria and drive in for hiking, whale watching, and other activities.

== Ragged Point Inn ==
Ragged Point Inn is a small hotel, consisting of a cluster of buildings in a garden setting on a clifftop above the Pacific Ocean. Rooms either have views of the garden grounds or look directly out over the ocean. The grounds are a popular wedding location throughout the summer high season, and the Inn offers package services for weddings and other events.

The property also includes other services, including Ragged Point Restaurant for finer dining, the Coffee Shop for drinks and quicker bites, as well as a gas station, quickie mart, and gift shop.

== See also ==
- San Carpóforo Canyon
