= Blue Ridge Berryessa Natural Area =

Conservation area in California, USA

- Location within California
- Nearest city: Napa, California
- Coordinates: 38.75°N 122.4°W
- Area: 800,000 acres (3,200 km^{2})
- Governing body: Blue Ridge Berryessa Conservation Partnership

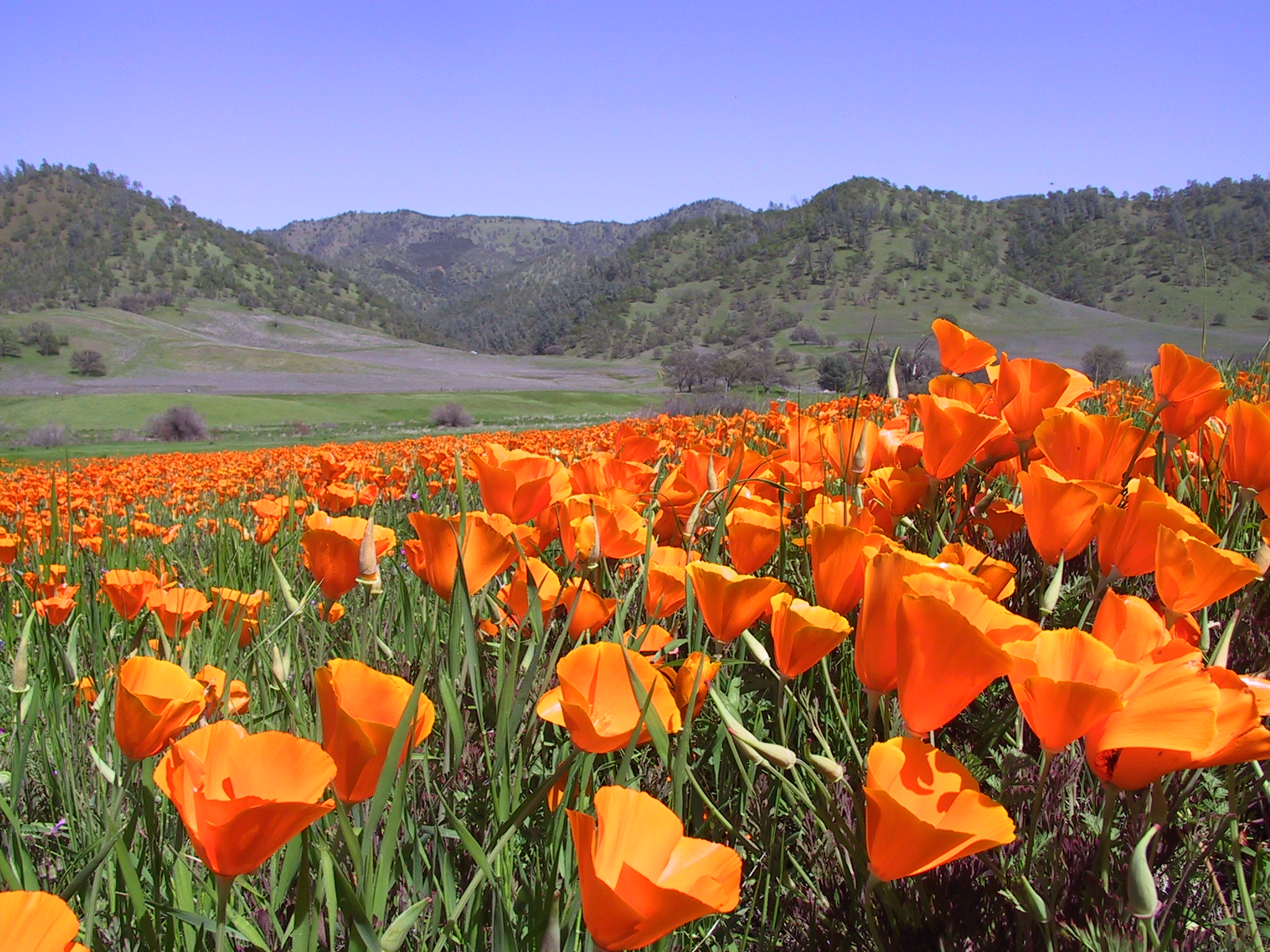
Berryessa Snow Mountain National Monument

The Blue Ridge Berryessa Natural Area is a conservation area forming a contiguous corridor of 800,000 acres (3,200 km^{2}) in northern California. It is a mix of public and private lands overseen by the Blue Ridge Berryessa Natural Area Conservation Partnership. The Partnership was founded in 1997 as a forum for land managers to discuss land use activities, primarily Homestake Mining Company surplus acreage at McLaughlin mine. The meetings evolved into a regional conservation focus and effort.

The Partnership has more than 100 participants, among them are: Yolo Land & Cattle Co., Homestake Mining Company, Guenoc Ranch and Winery, Bureau of Land Management, Gamble Ranch, and the University of California Natural Reserve System.

The purpose of the Blue Ridge Berryessa Natural Area is preservation of recreational lands, wild areas, agricultural lands and rural ranches. Also, protection against urban sprawl through conservation easements, public ownership and voluntary participation by private landowners and businesses.

The natural area is named for two prominent geographic features it encompasses: the Blue Ridge Mountains and Lake Berryessa. It includes the watersheds of Cache Creek and Putah Creek, tributaries to the Sacramento River. The geographical boundaries are informal and conceptual. It begins just north of Interstate 80 near Fairfield, California, then northeast to Lake County. Within the boundaries are: Lake Berryessa and the adjacent wildlife area, Knoxville Wildlife Area and the Knoxville off road recreation area, McLaughlin Natural Reserve, Stebbins Cold Canyon Reserve, Cache Creek Wilderness, the new Berryessa Snow Mountain National Monument, Yolo County regional parks, Indian Valley Reservoir and the southern section of Mendocino National Forest.

In 2002, the Partnership received the California Governor's Environmental and Economic Leadership Award, California's highest environmental honor, in the category Watershed Management.
