= Rancho Buena Vista (Soberanes) =

Spanish land grant in California

Coordinates: 36.600°N 121.650°W

Rancho Buena Vista was a 8,446-acre (34.18 km^{2}) Spanish land concession in the Salinas Valley, in present day Monterey County, California given in 1795 to Jose Maria Soberanes and Joaquin Castro. The grant was just south of Spreckels.

== History ==
José Maria Soberanes (1753-1803) was only 16 when he accompanied the Portola expedition to San Francisco Bay in 1769. Soberanes married Maria Josefa Castro (1759-1822) and retired from the military in 1795, and with his father-in-law, Joaquin Ysidro de Castro, received Rancho Buena Vista. Soberanes died in 1803 and his widow Maria Josefa Soberanes moved to Monterey with her sons Feliciano Soberanes (1788-1868) and Mariano Soberanes (1794-1859). Rancho Buena Vista was abandoned.

The rancho was regranted José Mariano Estrada and his son, José Santiago Estrada, by Governor Pablo Vicente de Solá in 1822. José Mariano Estrada (1784-), a Lieutenant of Mexican Artillery, came to California with his brother, José Raimundo Estrada (1784-), in 1797 with José Joaquín de Arrillaga. Mariano Estrada was the grantee of the two square league Rancho Buena Vista in 1822, and the two square league Rancho Llano de Buena Vista in 1823. Mariano Estrada married Maria Isabel Argüello who was the daughter of José Darío Argüello. Their son, José Ramón Estrada (1811-1845), was the grantee of Rancho El Toro and Rancho San Simeon. Another son, Julian Estrada (1813 – 1871), was the grantee of Rancho Santa Rosa. A daughter, Josefa Estrada, married Rafael Gomez (1784-1838), grantee of Rancho Tularcitos.

With the cession of California to the United States following the Mexican-American War, the 1848 Treaty of Guadalupe Hidalgo provided that the land grants would be honored. As required by the Land Act of 1851, a claim for Rancho Buena Vista was filed with the Public Land Commission in 1852, and the grant was patented to José Santiago Estrada in 1869.

In 1872, Hiram Corey leased the Buena Vista ranch of 7,772-acre (31.45 km^{2}) keeping 450 to 500 cows on the ranch. In 1891, he purchased 1,630-acre (6.6 km^{2}) of the ranch, renaming the property the Rancho Las Palmas.

== Historic sites of the Rancho ==
- Soberanes Adobe. José Estrada, who built this adobe in 1830, sold the property to Feliciano Soberanes (son of José Maria Soberanes). The adobe was the home of the Soberanes family from 1860 until 1922, when William O'Donnell acquired the property. The site is now registered as California Historical Landmark #712.
- Rancho Las Palmas. 1891 house of Hiram Corey, one of Monterey County's most successful stock farmers of the late 19th century. Also noted for its exemplary Queen Anne style in a rural setting.

== See also ==
- Ranchos of California
- List of Ranchos of California
