= Rancho El Toro =

Mexican land grant in California

Coordinates: 36.590°N 121.720°W

Rancho El Toro was a 5,668-acre (22.94 km^{2}) Mexican land grant in present day Monterey County, California given in 1835 by Governor José Castro to José Ramón Estrada. The grant extended along Toro Creek south of Hill Town on the Salinas River.

== History ==
José Ramón Estrada (1811-1845), son of José Mariano Estrada, grantee of Rancho Buena Vista, was born in Monterey. Ramón Estrada was administrator of Mission Santa Clara in 1835. He received the one and a half square league Rancho El Toro in 1835. Estrada married Maria Gregoria Castro. He was Alcalde of Monterey in 1836, and grantee of Rancho San Simeon in 1842. Estrada died in 1845.

Charles Wolter was a German captain of a Mexican vessel, and settled in Monterey in 1833. He married Joséfa Antonia Estrada de Gomez (1813-1890), a daughter of José Mariano Estrada, grantee of Rancho Buena Vista. Joséfa Antonia Estrada was the sister of José Ramón Estrada, and widow of Rafael Gomez (1784-1838), grantee of Rancho Tularcitos.

With the cession of California to the United States following the Mexican-American War, the 1848 Treaty of Guadalupe Hidalgo provided that the land grants would be honored. As required by the Land Act of 1851, a claim for Rancho El Toro was filed with the Public Land Commission in 1852, and the grant was patented to Charles Wolter in 1862.

After the death of Charles Wolter, his widow sold Rancho El Toro to David Jacks in 1880.

Benjamin Marks acquired the land in 1890; his family operated an egg farm there. Marks' sons sold some of their land to Monterey County to form Toro Regional Park. Benjaman Marks' son Herman donated the rest of the land to St. John's College on his death in 1982. Big Sur Land Trust acquired the land from the college in 2004. The trust transferred most of the land to Monterey County and continues to own the land surrounding the ranch house.

== See also ==
- Ranchos of California
- List of Ranchos of California
