= San Simeon, California =

Small community on the coast of California

- Unincorporated community Census-designated place
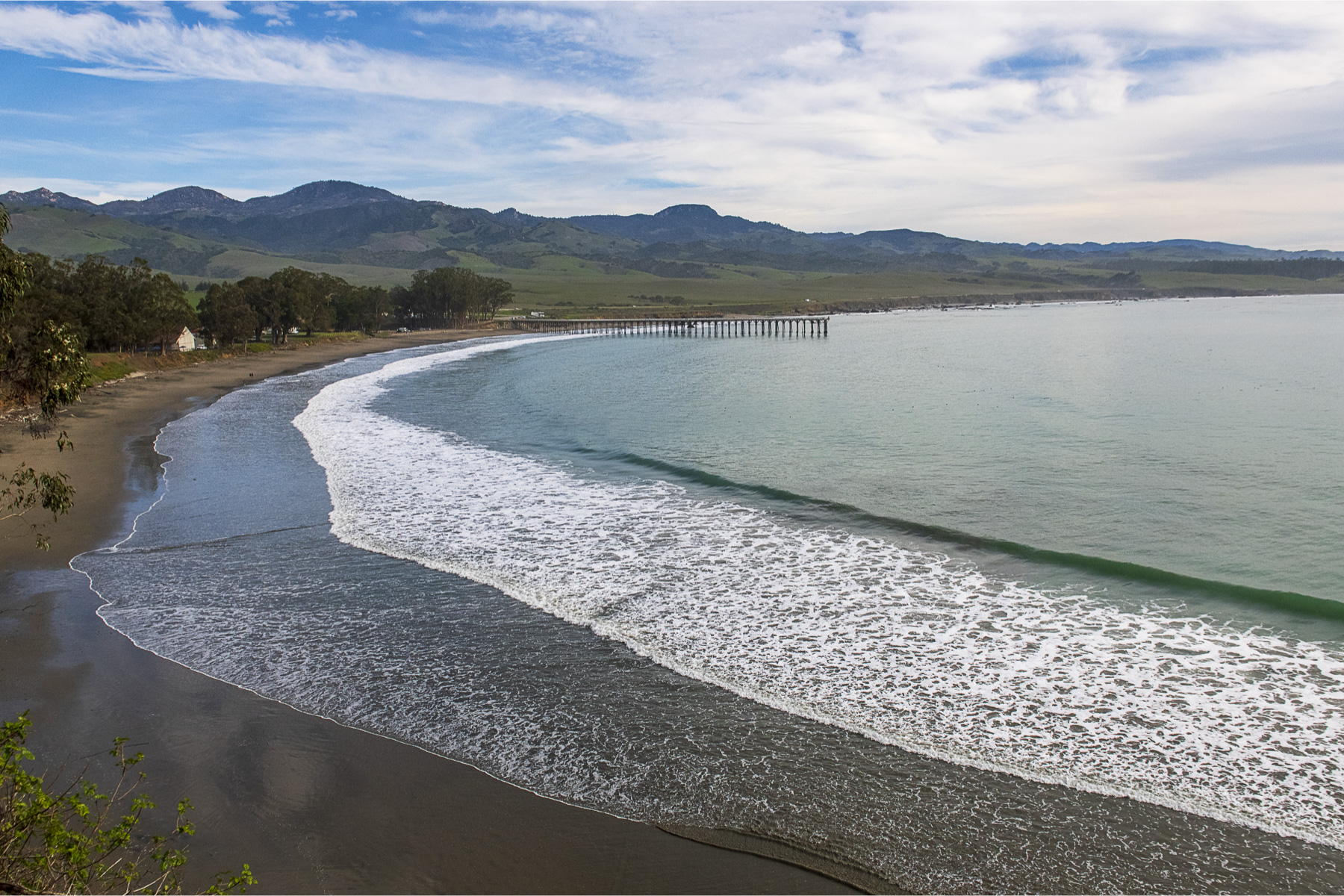
- View of San Simeon

- Location in San Luis Obispo County and the state of California

- Location in the United States
- Coordinates: 35°38′38″N 121°11′21″W
- Country: United States
- State: California
- County: San Luis Obispo

Area
  - Total: 0.797 sq mi (2.063 km^{2})
  - Land: 0.797 sq mi (2.063 km^{2})
  - Water: 0 sq mi (0 km^{2}) 0%
- Elevation: 230 ft (70 m)

Population (2020)
  - Total: 445
  - Density: 559/sq mi (216/km^{2})
- Time zone: UTC-08:00 (PST)
  - Summer (DST): UTC-07:00 (PDT)
- ZIP codes: 93452
- Area code: 805
- GNIS feature ID: 248966

San Simeon (Spanish: San Simeón, meaning "St. Simon") is an unincorporated community on the Pacific coast of San Luis Obispo County, California, United States. As of the 2020 census, San Simeon had a population of 445. Its position along State Route 1 is about halfway between Los Angeles and San Francisco, each of those cities being roughly 230 miles (370 km) away. A key feature of the area is Hearst Castle, a hilltop mansion built for William Randolph Hearst in the early 20th century that is now a tourist attraction. The area is also home to a large northern elephant seal rookery, known as the Piedras Blancas rookery, located 7 miles (11 km) north of San Simeon on Highway 1.

== History ==
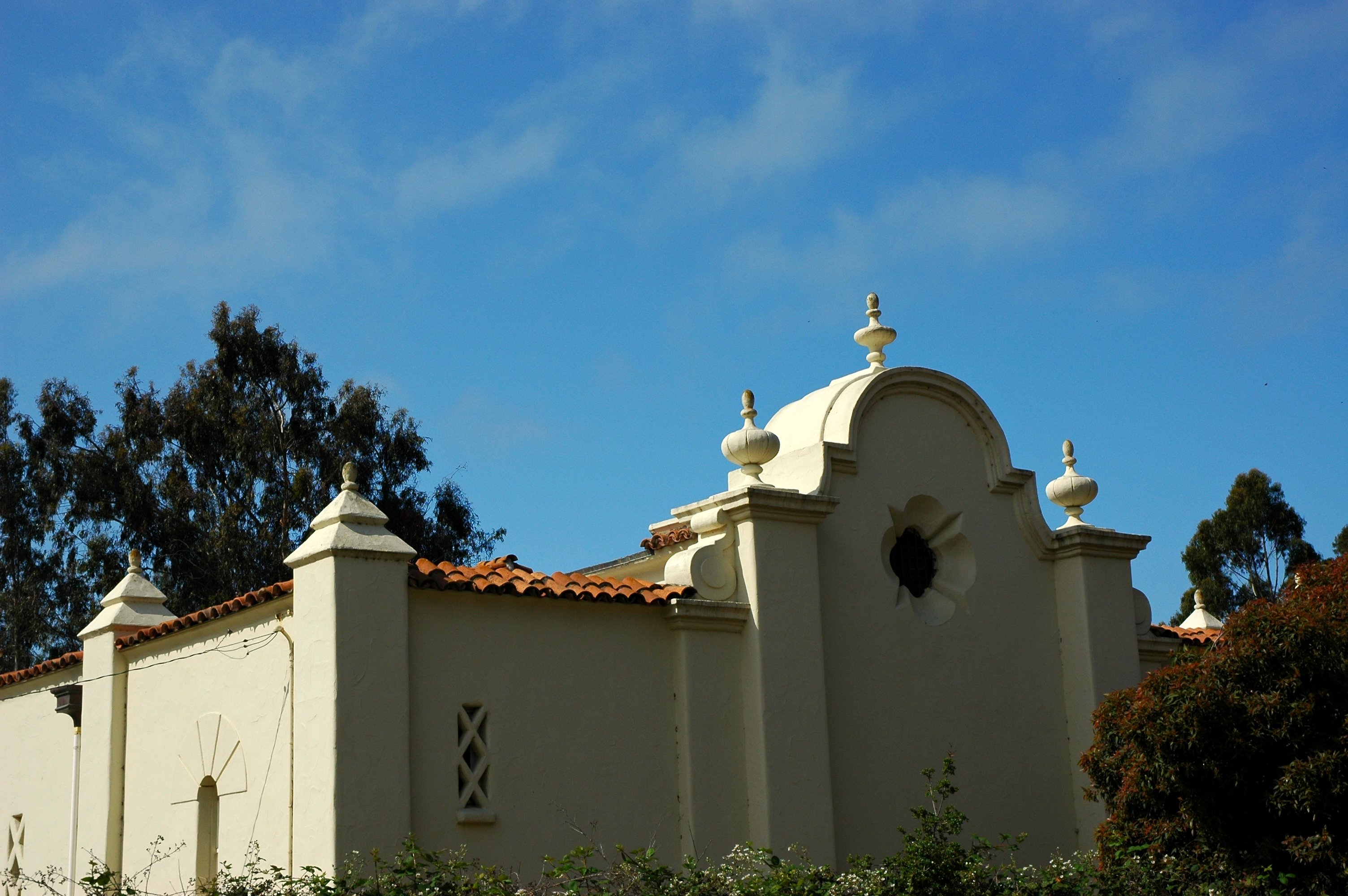
Spanish Colonial Revival building designed by Julia Morgan, 1926-1927.

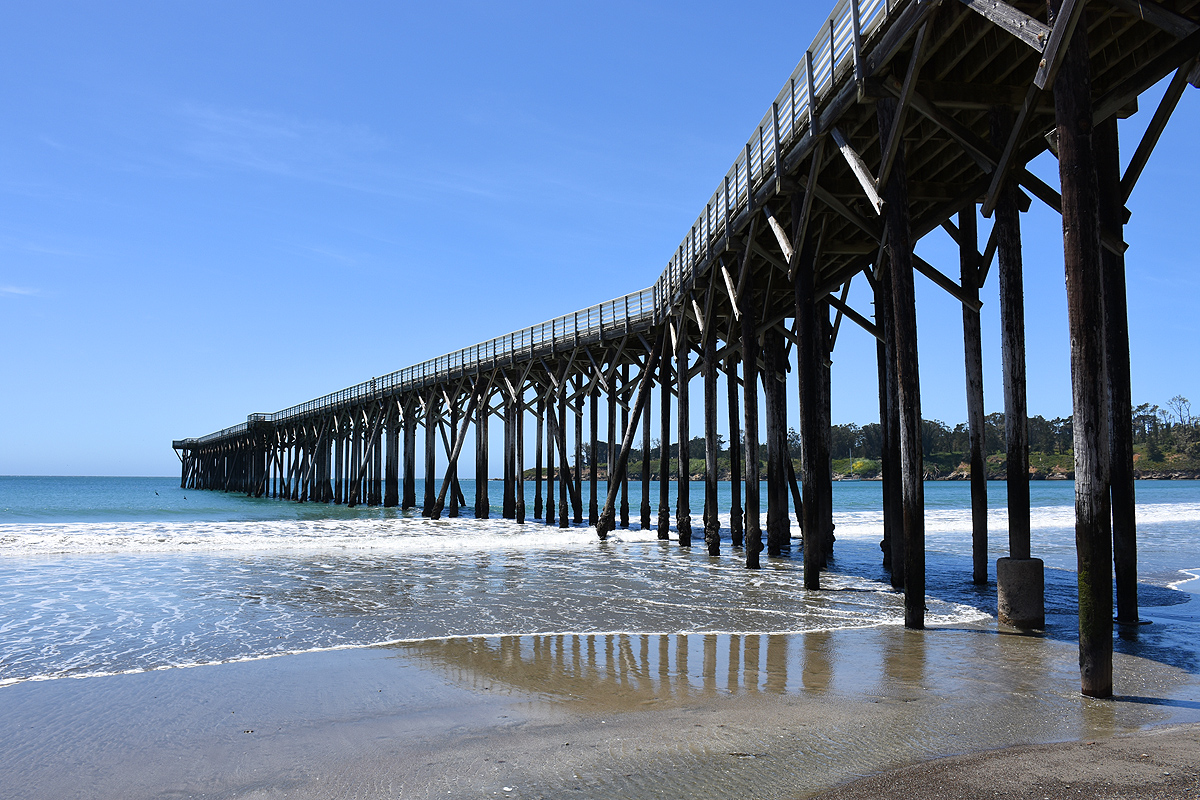
Historic Pier of San Simeon

Humans first settled the local area at least 11,000 years ago. Prehistorically, the local area was inhabited by the Chumash people, including a large village south of San Simeon at Morro Creek.

In 1542 the coastal exploration of Juan Cabrillo discovered the bay and named it the Bay of Sardines.

The first European land exploration of Alta California, the Spanish Portolà expedition, traveled northwest along the coast in September 1769. On September 11–12, the party passed the future location of San Simeon. At Ragged Point, which is about 15 mi (24 km) past San Simeon, the party turned inland across the Santa Lucia Range.

San Simeon was founded as an asistencia ("sub-mission") to Mission San Miguel Arcángel, founded in 1797, and located to the east across the Santa Lucia Range. The Bay of San Simeon is mentioned in the records of San Miguel Mission for 1830. San Simeon was named for Rancho San Simeon, although the town-site is actually north of that rancho, on the former Rancho Piedra Blanca, a Mexican land grant given in 1840 to José de Jesús Pico. In 1865, Pico sold part of the rancho to George Hearst, the father of William Randolph Hearst.

The first Europeans to settle in the immediate area near the bay of San Simeon were Portuguese shore whalers under the command of Captain Joseph Clark (born Machado) from the Cape Verde Islands, around 1864. In 1869, Captain Clark built a wharf near the point for his whaling station. A small community grew near the 1869 wharf, but the waves near the wharf were too high, and the wharf was abandoned. In 1878, Hearst built a new wharf, and the small community moved near the new wharf. A general store (later Sebastian's Store) was built near the Clark wharf, and then relocated near the 1878 wharf. Shore whaling continued on the point until the mid-1890s. It ceased for a short time, started up again in 1897, and continued until about 1908 when it ceased for good.

In 1953, the Hearst Corporation donated the William Randolph Hearst Memorial Beach, including the Hearst Pier, to San Luis Obispo County. It is currently part of Hearst San Simeon State Park. The present-day San Simeon pier was built in 1957.

== Geology ==
The name San Simeon also refers to some geologic structures of the area, particularly elements of the coastal Jurassic-age landforms and ophiolite rock formations.

== Geography ==
According to the United States Census Bureau, the census-designated place covers an area of 0.8 square mile (2.1 km^{2}), all land. The original townsite of San Simeon is at San Simeon Bay, and was the important 19th-century shipping point with the successive wharves that were built. San Simeon Acres, approximately four miles south of the original townsite, at the mouth of Pico Creek, about halfway between old San Simeon and Cambria, was established in the 1950s. Most of the development at San Simeon Acres took place from the 1960s through the 1980s. Many motels and cafes serve visitors to Hearst Castle, Big Sur and the beaches.

=== Climate ===
San Simeon and the Hearst Castle area has a mild warm-summer Mediterranean climate (Köppen Csb) featuring warm, dry summers and cool, wet winters that are moderated by its relative proximity to the Pacific coastline. NOW Data has readings from the San Simeon weather station since December 1999.

Climate data for San Simeon, California (Hearst Castle), 1999–2020 averages, extremes 1999–present
Month	Jan	Feb	Mar	Apr	May	Jun	Jul	Aug	Sep	Oct	Nov	Dec	Year
Record high °F (°C)	84 (29)	83 (28)	85 (29)	95 (35)	94 (34)	102 (39)	101 (38)	102 (39)	109 (43)	100 (38)	89 (32)	80 (27)	109 (43)
Mean maximum °F (°C)	74.6 (23.7)	73.9 (23.3)	76.8 (24.9)	81.9 (27.7)	84.6 (29.2)	91.0 (32.8)	91.9 (33.3)	94.7 (34.8)	96.1 (35.6)	90.9 (32.7)	83.1 (28.4)	72.1 (22.3)	100.3 (37.9)
Mean daily maximum °F (°C)	59.8 (15.4)	59.5 (15.3)	62.3 (16.8)	64.9 (18.3)	69.3 (20.7)	72.9 (22.7)	75.0 (23.9)	77.3 (25.2)	78.2 (25.7)	74.0 (23.3)	65.6 (18.7)	58.9 (14.9)	68.1 (20.1)
Daily mean °F (°C)	53.2 (11.8)	52.4 (11.3)	54.6 (12.6)	56.2 (13.4)	60.5 (15.8)	63.9 (17.7)	66.1 (18.9)	67.8 (19.9)	69.1 (20.6)	65.1 (18.4)	58.0 (14.4)	52.4 (11.3)	59.9 (15.5)
Mean daily minimum °F (°C)	46.5 (8.1)	45.3 (7.4)	46.9 (8.3)	47.4 (8.6)	51.6 (10.9)	54.9 (12.7)	57.1 (13.9)	58.3 (14.6)	60.0 (15.6)	54.3 (12.4)	50.3 (10.2)	45.8 (7.7)	51.5 (10.9)
Mean minimum °F (°C)	36.5 (2.5)	34.5 (1.4)	36.4 (2.4)	37.3 (2.9)	41.3 (5.2)	44.7 (7.1)	47.3 (8.5)	48.2 (9.0)	46.9 (8.3)	46.4 (8.0)	40.0 (4.4)	35.5 (1.9)	32.4 (0.2)
Record low °F (°C)	28 (−2)	25 (−4)	32 (0)	34 (1)	38 (3)	42 (6)	45 (7)	46 (8)	42 (6)	42 (6)	32 (0)	32 (0)	25 (−4)
Average precipitation inches (mm)	5.96 (151)	6.15 (156)	4.80 (122)	2.00 (51)	0.71 (18)	0.06 (1.5)	0.08 (2.0)	0.01 (0.25)	0.07 (1.8)	1.11 (28)	2.34 (59)	6.05 (154)	29.34 (744.55)
Average precipitation days (≥ 0.01 in)	7.6	8.9	7.3	5.2	2.4	0.3	0.2	0.2	0.5	3.3	4.6	8.4	48.9
Source 1: NOAA
Source 2: National Weather Service (mean maxima/minima 2006–2020)

== Demographics ==
Historical population
Census	Pop.	Note	%±
2010	462		—
2020	445		−3.7%
U.S. Decennial Census; 1850–1870 1880-1890; 1900 1910 1920; 1930 1940 1950; 1960 1970 1980; 1990 2000 2010

San Simeon first appeared as a census designated place in the 2010 U.S. census.

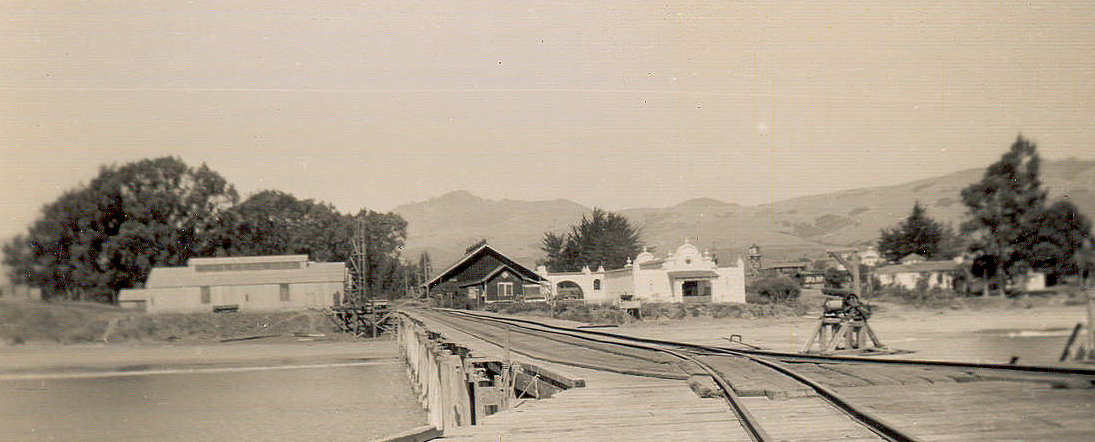
Old Hearst pier (built 1878) and the San Simeon waterfront, c. 1890s. Wooden warehouse and employee residence, next to rail line (dark wood) are at center. The white Spanish-style stucco building at right center is also a Hearst warehouse, still in use. The ridge in background is the future site of Hearst Castle.

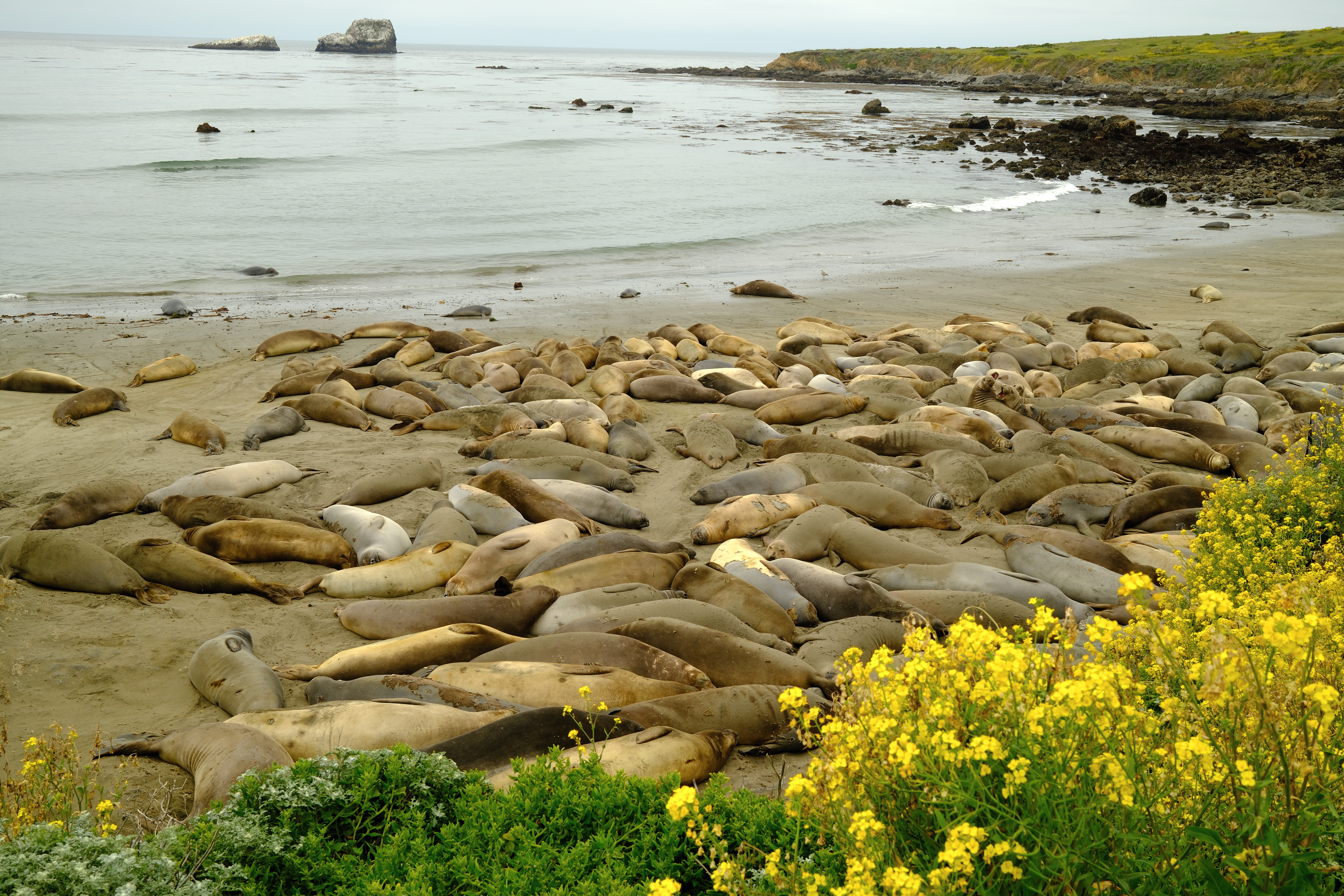
The Piedras Blancas Northern Elephant Seal rookery, 7 miles north of San Simeon, California.

For statistical purposes, the United States Census Bureau has defined San Simeon as a census-designated place (CDP). The 2020 United States census reported that San Simeon had a population of 445. The population density was 558.3 inhabitants per square mile (215.6/km^{2}). The racial makeup of San Simeon was 141 (31.7%) White, 1 (0.2%) African American, 10 (2.2%) Native American, 10 (2.2%) Asian, 0 (0.0%) Pacific Islander, 213 (47.9%) from other races, and 70 (15.7%) from two or more races. Hispanic or Latino of any race were 296 persons (66.5%).

The whole population lived in households. There were 187 households, out of which 50 (26.7%) had children under the age of 18 living in them, 74 (39.6%) were married-couple households, 10 (5.3%) were cohabiting couple households, 46 (24.6%) had a female householder with no partner present, and 57 (30.5%) had a male householder with no partner present. 71 households (38.0%) were one person, and 41 (21.9%) were one person aged 65 or older. The average household size was 2.38. There were 108 families (57.8% of all households).

The age distribution was 106 people (23.8%) under the age of 18, 37 people (8.3%) aged 18 to 24, 87 people (19.6%) aged 25 to 44, 123 people (27.6%) aged 45 to 64, and 92 people (20.7%) who were 65 years of age or older. The median age was 43.5 years. For every 100 females, there were 102.3 males.

There were 292 housing units at an average density of 366.4 units per square mile (141.5 units/km^{2}), of which 187 (64.0%) were occupied. Of these, 79 (42.2%) were owner-occupied, and 108 (57.8%) were occupied by renters.

== Infrastructure ==
The San Simeon Community Services District provides water and sewerage. The wastewater treatment plant is operated by a private company under contract with the district. The facility also processes sewage for Hearst Castle.

== Education ==
San Simeon is served by the Coast Unified School District and includes surrounding rural areas.
