= Cambria, California =

Cambria
- Unincorporated community Census designated place
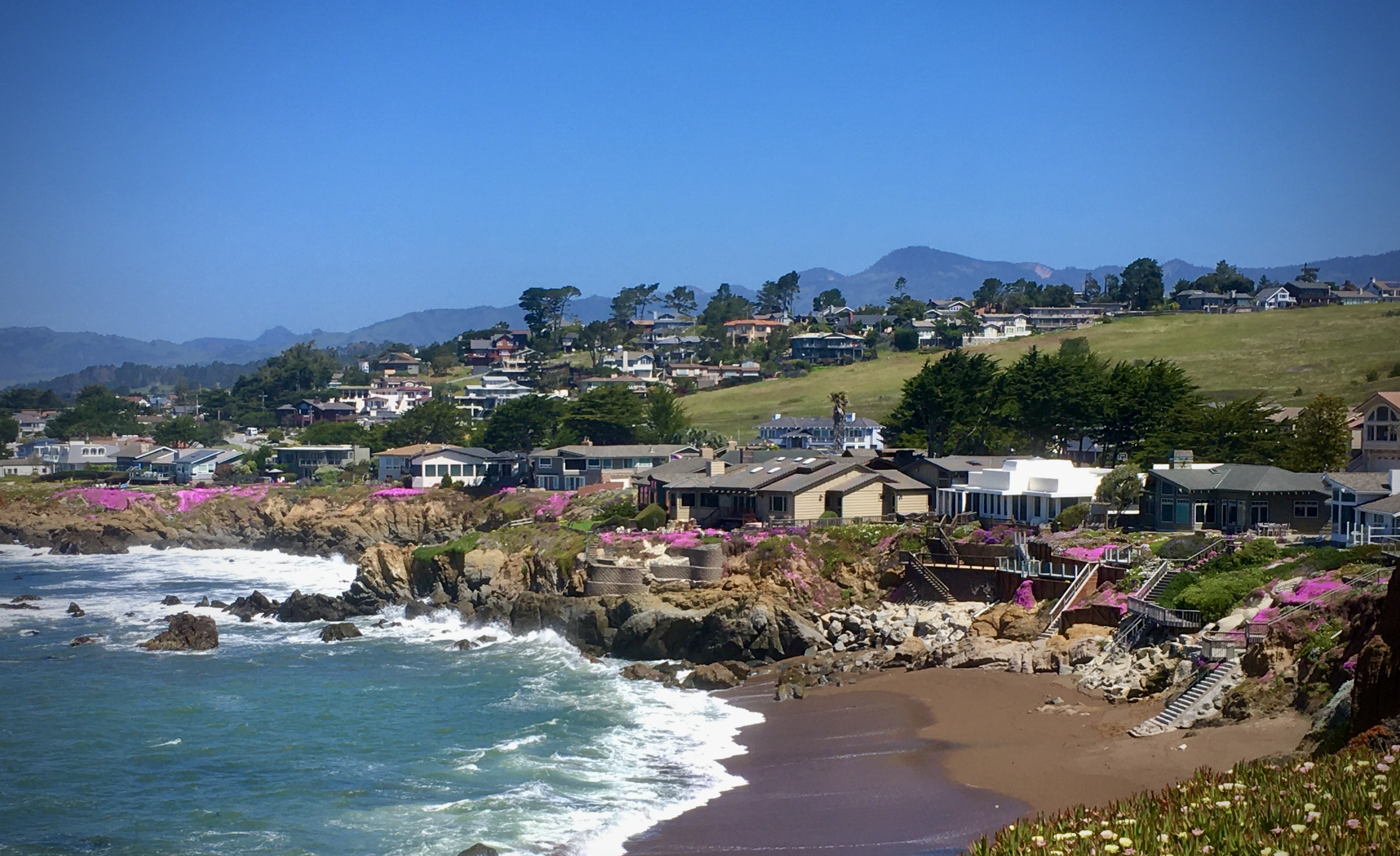
- View of Cambria

- Location in San Luis Obispo County and the state of California

- Location within California Location within the United States
- Coordinates: 35°33′15″N 121°5′15″W
- Country: United States
- State: California
- County: San Luis Obispo
- Named for: Cambria County, Pennsylvania

Area
  - Total: 8.42 sq mi (21.80 km^{2})
  - Land: 8.42 sq mi (21.80 km^{2})
  - Water: 0 sq mi (0.00 km^{2}) 0%
- Elevation: 43 ft (13 m)

Population (2020)
  - Total: 5,678
  - Density: 674.5/sq mi (260.41/km^{2})
- Time zone: UTC-08:00 (PST)
  - Summer (DST): UTC-07:00 (PDT)
- ZIP code: 93428
- Area code: 805
- FIPS code: 06-10074
- GNIS feature IDs: 1652683, 2407941

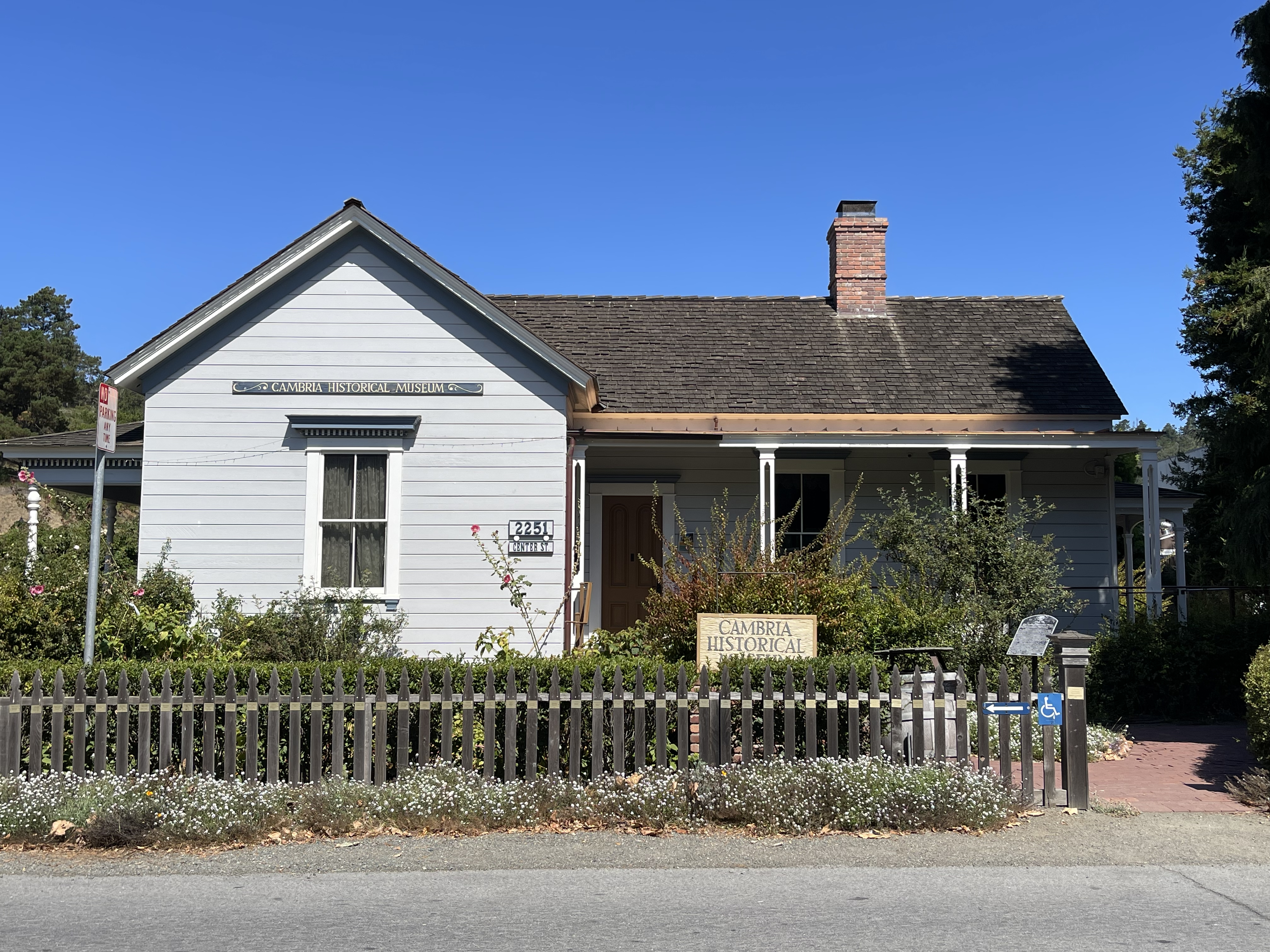
Cambria Historical Museum, in the restored Guthrie-Bianchini House, built 1870

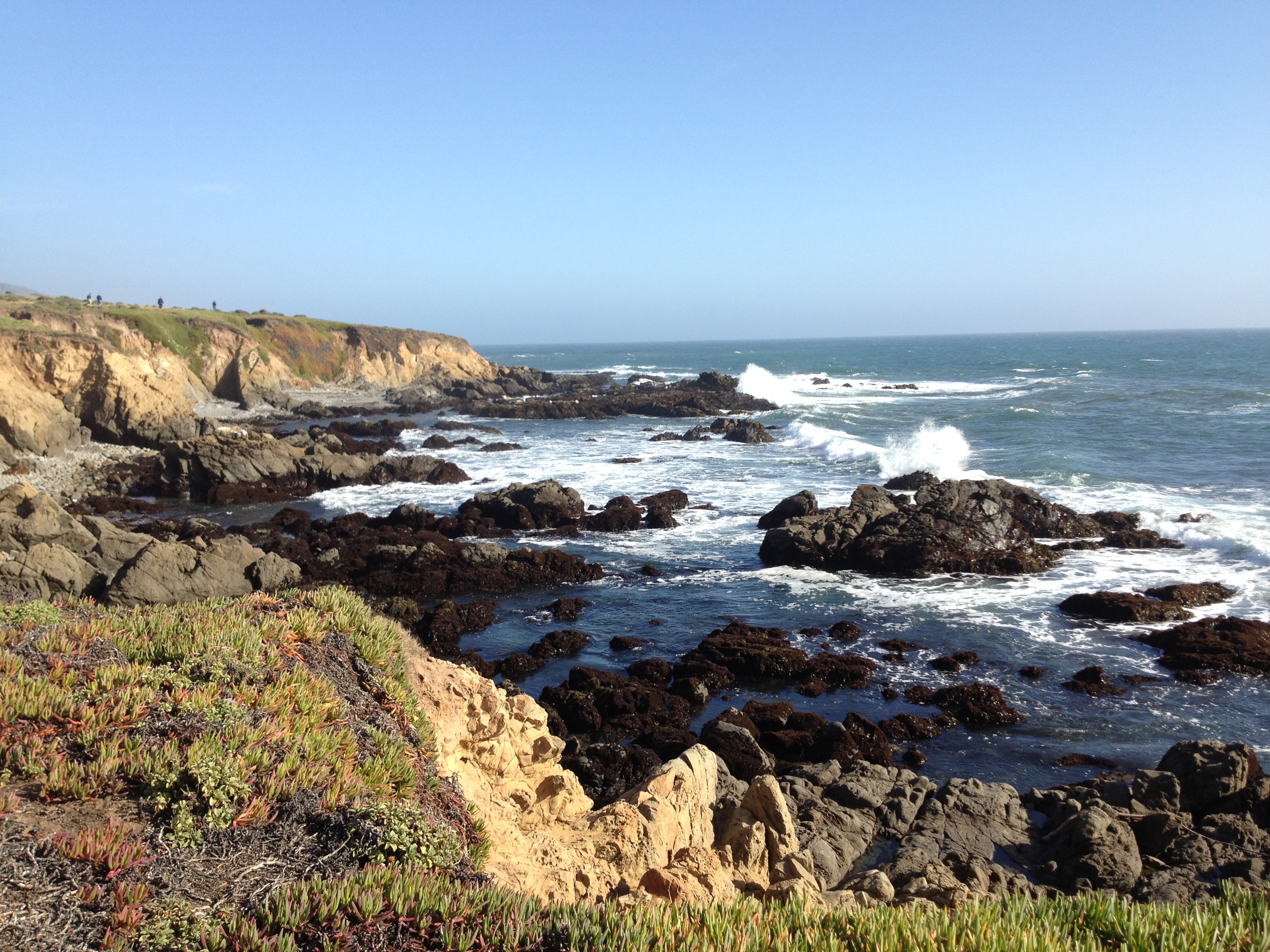
Bluffs and rocky shoreline at the Fiscalini Ranch Preserve in Cambria

Cambria (/ˈkæmbriə/) is a coastal town in San Luis Obispo County, California, United States midway between San Francisco and Los Angeles along California State Route 1 (Highway 1). The name Cambria, chosen in 1869, is the Latin name for Wales (Welsh, Cymru). Cambria is situated amidst Monterey pines in one of only three such native forests. The town previously had gone by the names of Slabtown, Rosaville, San Simeon, and Santa Rosa.

For statistical purposes, the United States Census Bureau has defined the unincorporated community as a census-designated place (CDP). The CDP of Cambria had a population of 5,678 at the 2020 census, down from 6,032 at the 2010 census.

== Name ==
A Chumash site on present-day Cambria was named tsɨtkawayu, Obispeño for "place of the horses". The American settlement was originally known as Slabtown, with the town later known as Cambria centered at the Leffingwell cove of today's northern Moonstone Beach, which beach also featured a wharf.

Because lumber production, ranching activities and mercury mining increased in the area, the village adopted the more dignified name of Cambria. Locals seem to agree that the name was contributed by a local surveyor from Cambria County, Pennsylvania, because the local topography and flora reminded him of that place.

However, this differs from Onomastic data published in several other sources. A 1960 study of California place names, often contemporarily quoted elsewhere states "A Welshman named Llewellyn dubbed his shop 'The Cambria Carpenter Shop,' and in 1869, the good folks adopted it as the official name." Forty-three years prior to that, the History of San Luis Obispo County and environs contains a similar account:

The first name applied to the settlement was Slabtown. Others wanted it named Santa Rosa and Roseville. It remained, however, for a decided old Welshman to name it for all time. While others were squabbling over the name, he hung out his sign, "Cambria Carpenter Shop." This man from Wales, Llewellyn by name, persistently spoke of the town as "Cambria" (Wales); and when it came to a show-down with the postal authorities, "Cambria" stood the test and became the town's official name.

== History ==
=== Local tribes ===
The earliest human settlement of this area is known to be associated with prehistoric habitation by the Native American Chumash peoples, who harvested along the coastal area, with emphasis upon sites that were close to rivers.

Although recorded history of the tribes in this region does not begin until the explorers and missionaries arrived, there is evidence of many tribal settlements in the area later known as Cambria. It is estimated that as many as 30,000 people inhabited the area in the time (some 1,000 years) before the Spanish arrived. Experts believe these tribes to have been migratory and used Cambria as a seasonal settlement; other scientists are convinced that they lived there permanently. Most agree that they fed themselves with shellfish and seafood, as well as obtaining food from travels inland to hunt and gather seeds.

A variety of artistically crafted implements have been discovered, including spear points and arrowheads made from obsidian; mortars and pestles made from basalt, sandstone, and granite; and soapstone kettles and stone hammers. These early inhabitants were skilled basket and net makers and fashioned jewelry from crab claws, abalone shells, and the teeth of sharks and whales. The presence of soapstone (steatite) provides evidence that they traded with the Catalina Island tribes, whereas the lack of metals and glass indicates that they did not trade with Europeans or Asians.

=== Early settlers and quicksilver ===
The first recorded visit by Europeans took place in 1769 when the Portola expedition, coming overland from the south, visited the area. The Spanish explorers camped near the present site of the Coast Union High School, on Santa Rosa Creek, on September 10, 1769, and again on December 24–25, spending the first Christmas in what later became known as Cambria. The Spanish soldiers named the site El Osito, because the local Chumash people offered them a young pet bear (which they politely refused). Gifts of food (pinole and fish) were particularly welcome on their return journey, because food supplies were running short.

Cambria is located on the Rancho Santa Rosa Mexican land grant given in 1841 to Julian Estrada.

Settlers were drawn to the area because of the fertile land, streams, and lumber. Additionally, miners were attracted to the area by the 1862 discovery of cinnabar, an ore from which mercury can be extracted. For a while, Cambria was a boom town, with $280,000 worth of mercury shipped out of San Simeon between 1867 and 1870.

During several years Cambria was a booming mine town, and prospectors flooded the area. More than 150 claims were filed in the early 1870s. The most successful of these claims, the Oceanic Quicksilver Mining Company, at one time employed 300 and was the largest mine in the area and the sixth largest in the world. Three furnaces were built, seven tunnels completed, and their stock price jumped to $30.00 per share. Hopes were high, and Cambria residents dreamed of imminent wealth. Unfortunately, by 1878, mercury prices started to fall, and Cambria's first economic boom ended. As mercury prices fluctuated, Cambria's mining thrived and dwindled. During the boom of 1876, $282,832 worth of quicksilver was produced; four years later, production had decreased to only $6,760. A devastating fire in 1889 virtually ended the mercury business and Cambria settled into a quiet dairy community.

==== Hearst Castle and SS Montebello ====
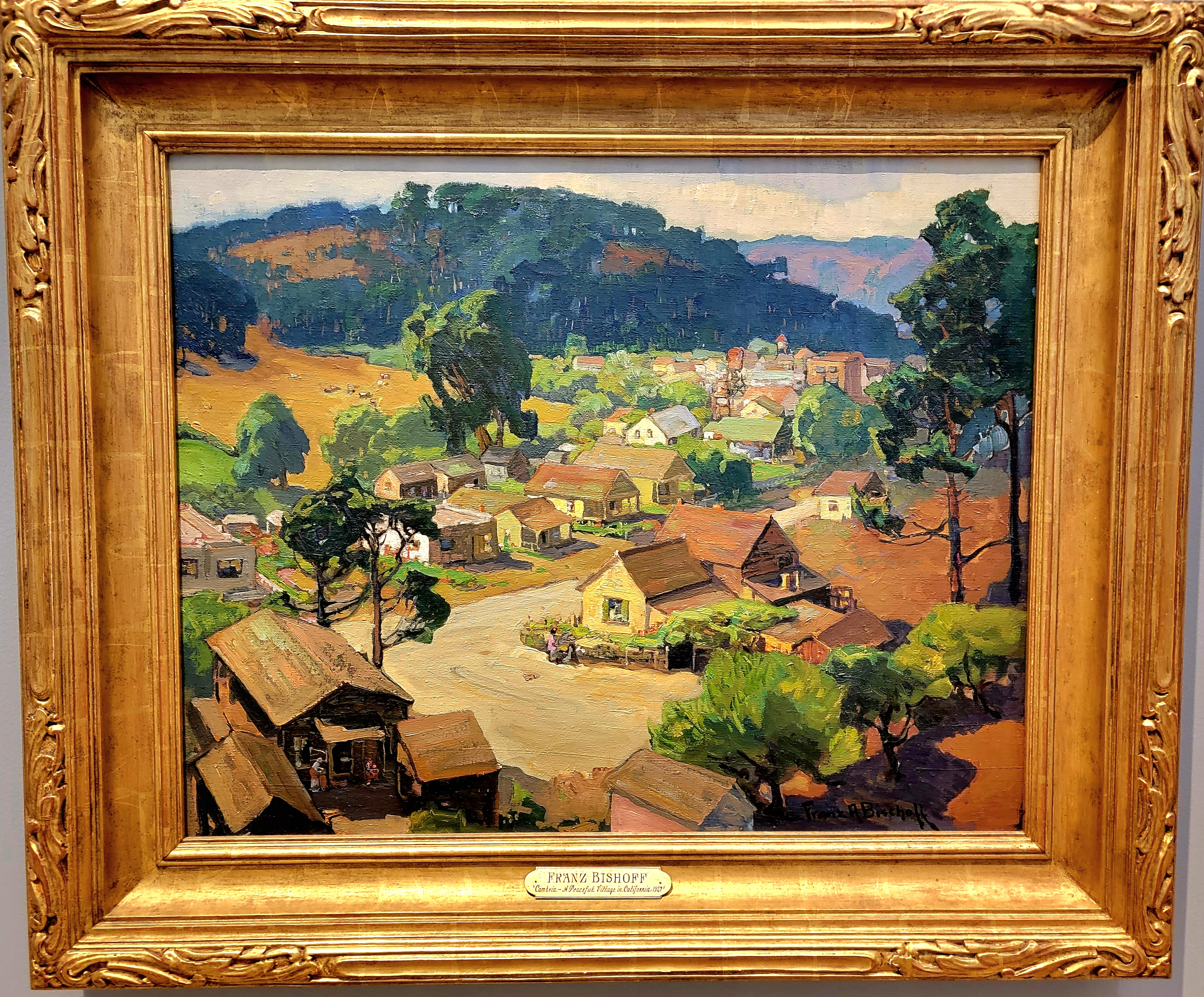
Painting of Cambria, approximately 1925

Cambria has benefited greatly from the construction of Hearst Castle. During the high unemployment years of the Great Depression, many Cambria citizens found welcome employment in construction. Additionally, Cambria provided supplies, services, and accommodations for many who came to build the Castle, creating prosperity in Cambria in an otherwise less prosperous decade.

War affected Cambria when the 8,000-ton Union Oil tanker SS Montebello was attacked and sunk by a Japanese submarine in the early morning of December 23, 1941. Cambria citizens rallied to the rescue and all six crewmen were saved. According to the captain, Olaf Eckstrom, these citizens of Cambria were real heroes: "God Bless 'em — they performed like American seamen, orderly, efficient, without hysteria."

The historic Old Santa Rosa Chapel, which was built in 1870, and as one of the oldest churches in the county of San Luis Obispo, held Catholic mass until May 26, 1963. The church fell into neglect until 1978, when the chapel and cemetery were restored.

== Geography ==
According to the United States Census Bureau, the CDP has a total area of 8.5 square miles (22 km^{2}), all land.

=== Climate ===
Cambria has a warm-summer (csb) Mediterranean climate typical for the coastal regions of southern California, experiencing an Indian summer with the warmest days in August and September. Winters are cool and wet with mild days, chilly nights, and great rainfall. Summers are warm and dry with sometimes hot days, cool nights, and almost no rainfall. Fog is common.

Climate data for Cambria
Month	Jan	Feb	Mar	Apr	May	Jun	Jul	Aug	Sep	Oct	Nov	Dec	Year
Mean daily maximum °F (°C)	63.5 (17.5)	64.2 (17.9)	65.3 (18.5)	67.2 (19.6)	68.6 (20.3)	70.9 (21.6)	72.9 (22.7)	74.3 (23.5)	74.7 (23.7)	73.3 (22.9)	68.9 (20.5)	63.5 (17.5)	69.45 (20.81)
Daily mean °F (°C)	53.4 (11.9)	54.4 (12.4)	55.7 (13.2)	57.0 (13.9)	58.9 (14.9)	61.5 (16.4)	63.8 (17.7)	67.8 (19.9)	64.9 (18.3)	63.9 (17.7)	60.1 (15.6)	54.9 (12.7)	59.6 (15.3)
Mean daily minimum °F (°C)	43.2 (6.2)	44.6 (7.0)	46.0 (7.8)	46.7 (8.2)	49.2 (9.6)	52.0 (11.1)	54.6 (12.6)	59.9 (15.5)	55.1 (12.8)	54.4 (12.4)	51.2 (10.7)	46.2 (7.9)	50.26 (10.14)
Average precipitation inches (cm)	4 (10)	4.1 (10)	3.5 (8.9)	1.2 (3.0)	0.4 (1.0)	0.1 (0.25)	0 (0)	0 (0)	0.2 (0.51)	0.9 (2.3)	1.7 (4.3)	3.4 (8.6)	19.5 (50)
Average precipitation days (≥ 0.01 in)	8.2	9.2	8.2	4.6	1.9	0.7	0.4	0.4	1.4	3.1	5.0	7.3	50.4
Source: Bestplace.net

== Demographics ==
Historical population
Census	Pop.	Note	%±
1970	1,716		—
1980	3,061		78.4%
1990	5,382		75.8%
2000	6,232		15.8%
2010	6,032		−3.2%
2020	5,678		−5.9%
U.S. Decennial Census; 1850–1870 1880-1890; 1900 1910 1920; 1930 1940 1950; 1960 1970 1980; 1990 2000 2010

=== 2020 census ===
As of the 2020 census, Cambria had a population of 5,678 and a population density of 674.5 inhabitants per square mile (260.4/km^{2}). The median age was 63.0 years. 11.1% of residents were under the age of 18 and 45.2% of residents were 65 years of age or older. For every 100 females there were 89.4 males, and for every 100 females age 18 and over there were 87.7 males age 18 and over.

The census reported that 99.7% of the population lived in households, 0.3% lived in non-institutionalized group quarters, and no one was institutionalized. 96.5% of residents lived in urban areas, while 3.5% lived in rural areas.

There were 2,695 households in Cambria, of which 12.4% had children under the age of 18 living in them. Of all households, 51.4% were married-couple households, 5.3% were cohabiting couple households, 15.0% were households with a male householder and no spouse or partner present, and 28.3% were households with a female householder and no spouse or partner present. About 32.2% of all households were made up of individuals and 22.8% had someone living alone who was 65 years of age or older. The average household size was 2.1. There were 1,646 families (61.1% of all households).

There were 4,046 housing units, of which 33.4% were vacant. Of the 2,695 occupied units (66.6% of total housing units), 74.5% were owner-occupied and 25.5% were occupied by renters. The homeowner vacancy rate was 2.0% and the rental vacancy rate was 12.8%.

Racial composition as of the 2020 census
Race	Number	Percent
White	4,213	74.2%
Black or African American	11	0.2%
American Indian and Alaska Native	52	0.9%
Asian	96	1.7%
Native Hawaiian and Other Pacific Islander	5	0.1%
Some other race	570	10.0%
Two or more races	731	12.9%
Hispanic or Latino (of any race)	1,260	22.2%

=== Income and poverty ===
In 2023, the US Census Bureau estimated that the median household income was $89,049, and the per capita income was $53,560. About 9.6% of families and 9.8% of the population were below the poverty line.

=== 2010 census ===
The 2010 United States census reported that Cambria had a population of 6,032. The population density was 708.9 inhabitants per square mile (273.7/km^{2}). The racial makeup of Cambria was 5,166 (85.6%) White, 18 (0.3%) African American, 47 (0.8%) Native American, 78 (1.3%) Asian, 14 (0.2%) Pacific Islander, 557 (9.2%) from other races, and 152 (2.5%) from two or more races. Hispanic or Latino of any race were 1,187 persons (19.7%).

The Census reported that 6,031 people (100% of the population) lived in households; only 1 (0%) was known to live in non-institutionalized group quarters, and none were institutionalized.

There were 2,762 households, out of which 442 (16.0%) had children under the age of 18 living with them; 1,483 (53.7%) were opposite-sex married couples living together, 200 (7.2%) had a female householder with no husband present, 75 (2.7%) had a male householder with no wife present. There were 130 (4.7%) unmarried opposite-sex partnerships and 31 (1.1%) same-sex married couples or partnerships. 804 households (29.1%) were made up of individuals, and 422 (15.3%) had someone living alone who was 65 years of age or older. The average household size was 2.18 persons. There were 1,758 families (63.6% of all households); the average family consisted of 2.61 persons.

The population was spread out, with 858 people (14.2%) under the age of 18, 281 people (4.7%) aged 18 to 24, 865 people (14.3%) aged 25 to 44, 2,116 people (35.1%) aged 45 to 64, and 1,912 people (31.7%) who were 65 years of age or older. The median age was 57.1 years. For every 100 females, there were 90.6 males. For every 100 females age 18 and over, there were 88.2 males.

There were 4,062 housing units at an average density of 477.4 per square mile (184.3/km^{2}), of which 1,985 (71.9%) were owner-occupied, and 900 (28.1%) were occupied by renters. The homeowner vacancy rate was 3.4%; the rental vacancy rate was 10.1%. 4,030 people (66.8% of the population) lived in owner-occupied housing units and 2,001 people (33.2%) lived in rental housing units.

== Tourism ==
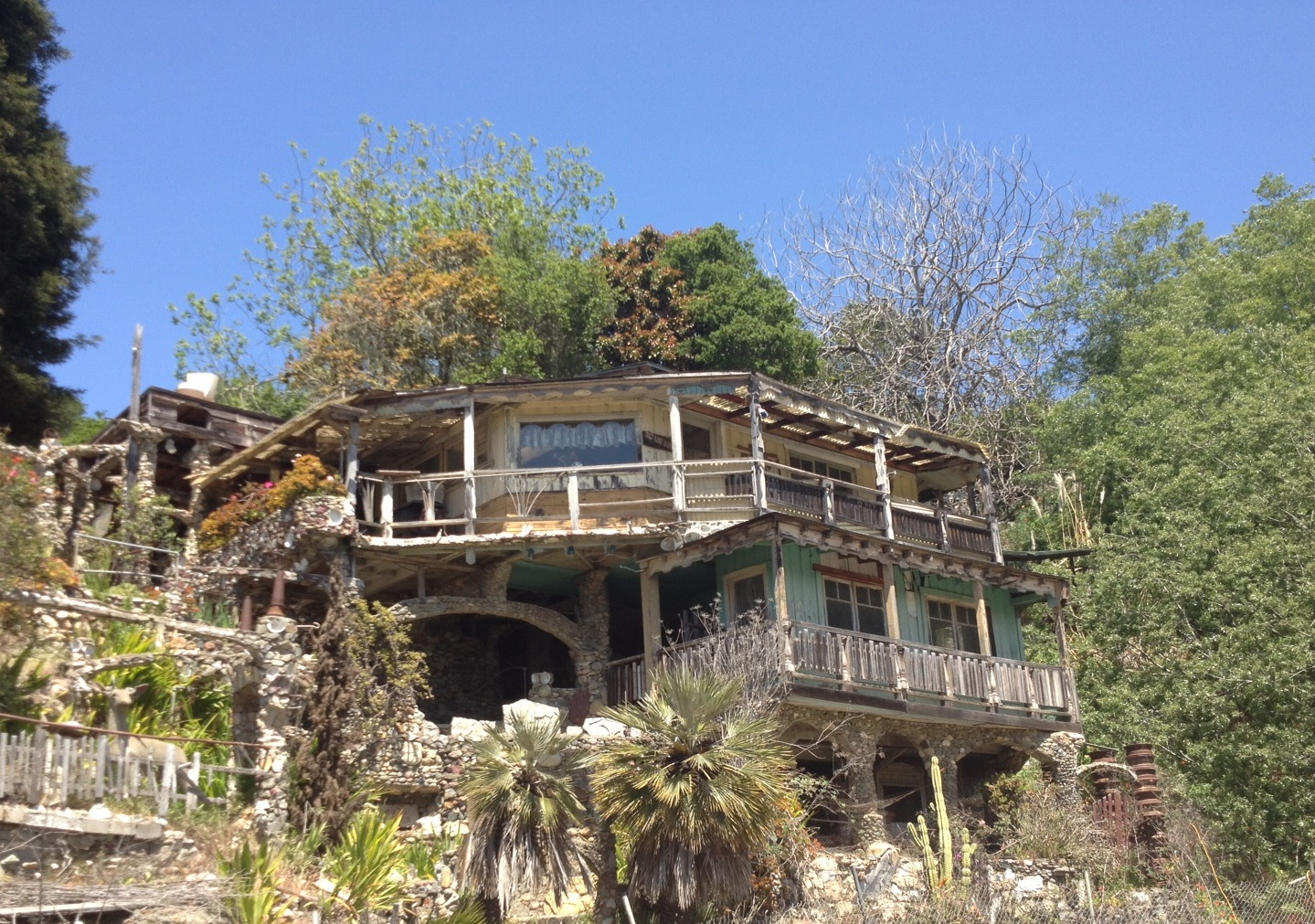
Nitt Witt Ridge, a historic house built from recycled material, is a California Historical Landmark.

The primary economic activity of Cambria is tourism. Located on the Pacific Ocean, the area has both rocky cliffs and beaches. The town and adjacent hills are known for the extensive Monterey pines that give the area a particular character. The 2012–2014 drought severely affected the forests, with estimates that as many as 40% of the trees were dying.

There are many bed and breakfast inns and hotels, especially along Moonstone Beach Drive. One visiting author described seeing "many impressive homes of highly imaginative design" and encouraged a casual tour of the residential district. The beach is home to various sea life such as seals and sea otters and tide pools filled with sea anemones, sea urchins, sea stars, crabs, snails, and more. The beach was named after the moonstones that wash ashore there. Moonstone Beach Boardwalk is a 1.5 miles (2.4 km) walk with several beach access points and benches to allow for sea life observation and beach combing.

Hearst Castle is located approximately six miles north, and the Northern elephant seal rookery at Piedras Blancas is some fifteen miles to the north. Cambria is home to the Cambria Historical Museum in the historic East Village and to the California State Historical Landmark No 939, Nitt Witt Ridge.

== Parks and recreation ==
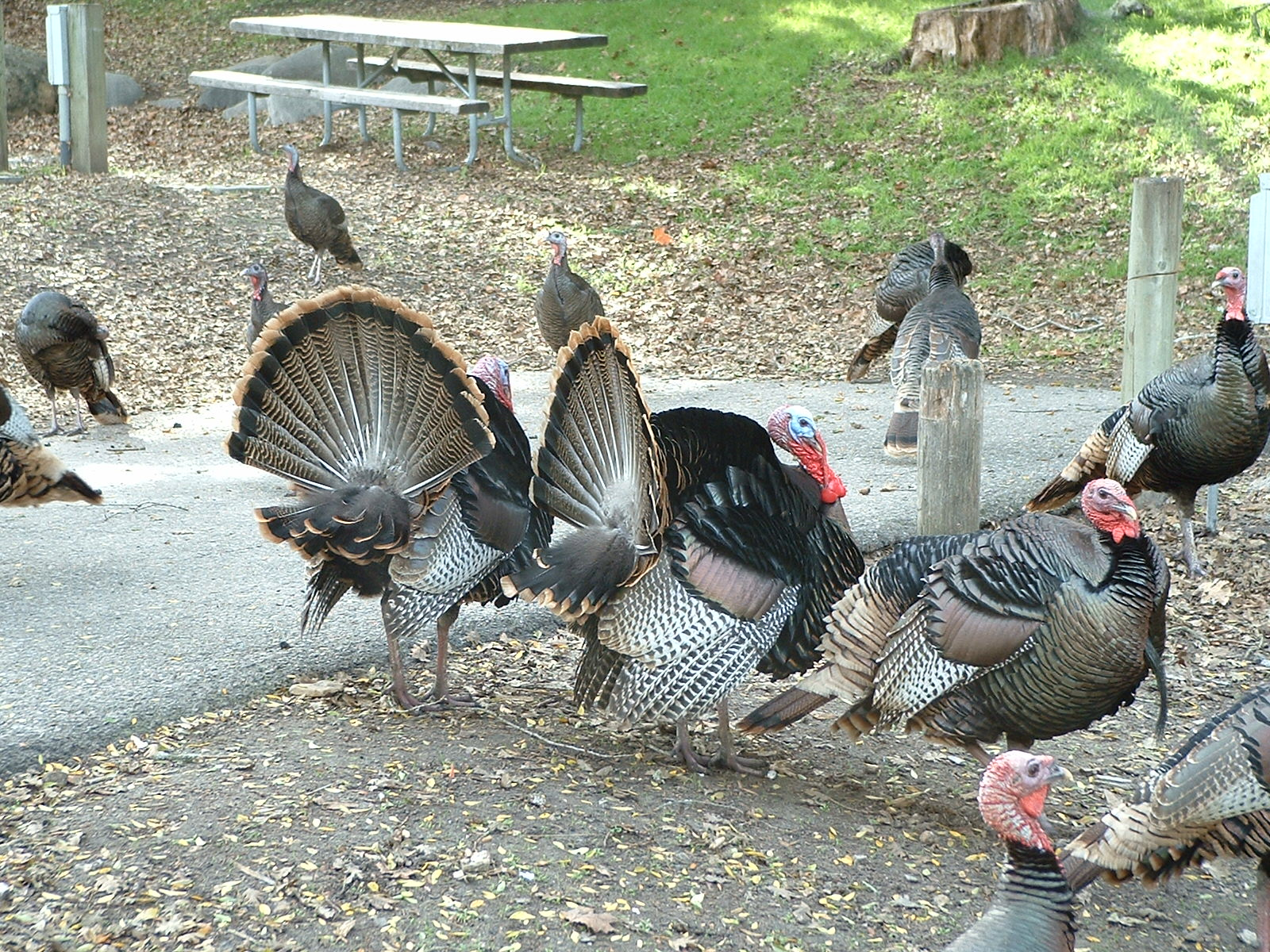
Wild turkeys are a common sight around Cambria.

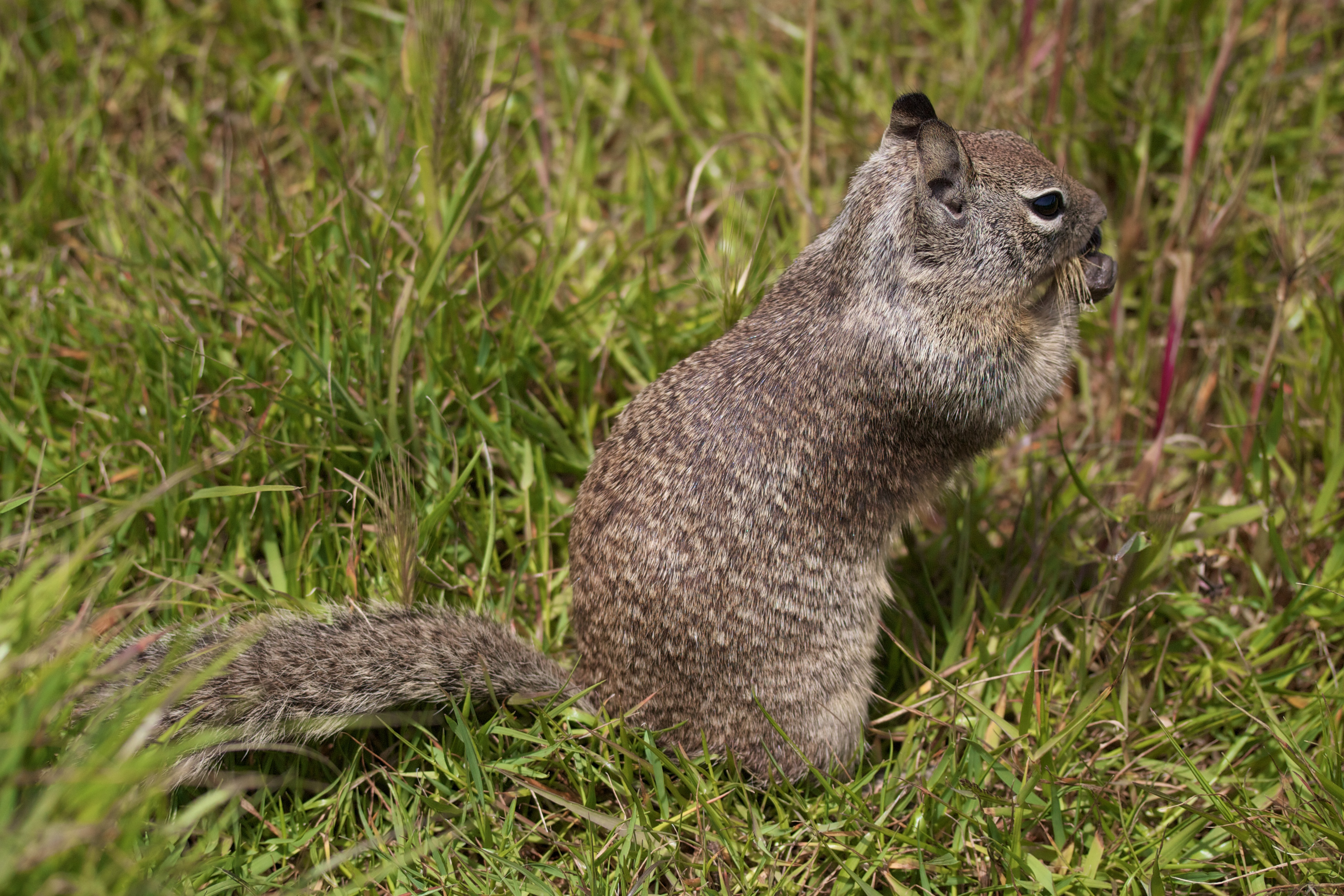
California ground squirrels are a common sight near Cambria's beaches.

Cambria offers a variety of recreational activities such as bicycling and hiking. Local beaches offer a venue to boogie board, surf, and skimboard. Ocean fishing is conducted off area beaches. Local kayak fishing tours are available.

=== Protected areas ===
The Fiscalini Ranch Preserve (formerly known as the East-West Ranch) is a 430-acre park that separates Cambria's East and West Villages; it protects over a mile of spectacular Pacific Ocean coastline. The Fiscalinis were pioneering Italian Swiss dairymen, who moved into the Cambria region in the 1880s; they acquired a number of dairy farms, including what they called the Town Ranch. The Fiscalini family donated small plots of the Town Ranch as building sites for the Cambria public library, the Veterans Memorial, and a museum. By the 1970s, the Fiscalini heirs, facing an inheritance tax of over one million dollars, sought a buyer, preferably a non-profit organization. None came forth, and in 1979 they sold the property to a developer, who went bankrupt in 1989 after failing to win approval of his ambitious development plans. The Fiscalini property was then sold for three million dollars to wealthy investors in the early 1990s. However, their development plans were also rejected, and in 2000 they sold the property to the American Land Conservancy. The park is managed by the Cambria Community Services District.

=== Marine protected areas ===
Cambria State Marine Conservation Area and White Rock (Cambria) State Marine Conservation Area are marine protected areas off the coast of Cambria. Much like other underwater parks, the marine protected areas help conserve ocean wildlife and marine ecosystems.

== Geology ==
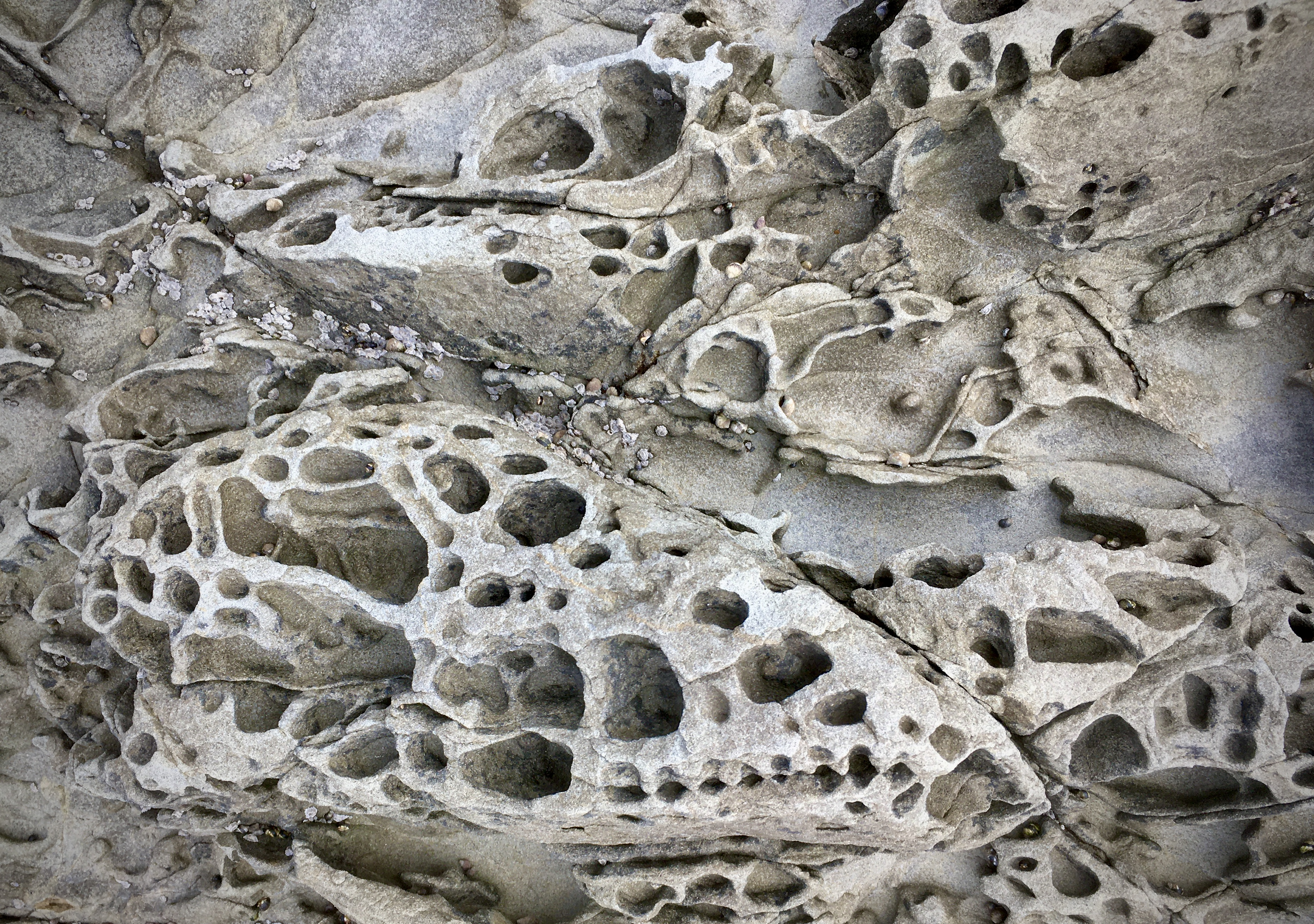
Unusual tafoni in the graywacke sandstone at Moonstone Beach, Cambria

Cambria is built on the Cambria Slab, a 5,000 ft. thick late-Cretaceous sandstone in a rather enigmatic geologic setting, completely surrounded by Franciscan Formation rocks, mostly mélange. The Cambria Slab extends from Villa Creek in Estero Bluffs State Park to San Simeon Creek, holding up the high coastal ridge between Cayucos and San Simeon State Park. The sandstones are massively bedded. Bedding is only occasionally visible, as at the Leffingwell Landing bridge on Moonstone Beach. Compositionally, they are a feldspathic graywacke. The rocks in places are distorted and sheared (for example, below the high bluff at the north end of Moonstone Beach), and in a few areas injected by Franciscan mélanges and serpentinites (as on the beach below the high bluff at the north end of the Bluff Trail in the Fiscalini Ranch preserve). The Cambria Slab was deposited in an area of active subduction during the plate-tectonic assembly of today's coastal California.

== Government ==
In the state legislature Cambria is in the 17th senatorial district, represented by Democrat John Laird, and in the 30th Assembly district, represented by Democrat Dawn Addis.

In the United States House of Representatives, Cambria is in California's 19th congressional district, represented by Democrat Jimmy Panetta.

== Education ==
Cambria is home to the Coast Unified School District. The Coast Unified has one K-5 elementary school, one 6–8 middle school, one traditional 9–12 high school, Coast Union High School, and one alternative high school. The district also serves the communities of San Simeon to the north and Cayucos to the south (grades 9–12) as well as the surrounding rural areas.

=== Coast Union High School ===
Coast Union High School, home of the Broncos, is a very small public high school located on the farmland of Cambria. It typically enrolls around 150 students, all active in FFA, school clubs, athletics, and many other school activities.

==== Athletics ====
Although known for its very small enrollment, Coast Union does perform well in sports. The girls volleyball team has won two CIF Southern Section Championships: in 1993's Division VI and 2011's Division 5A. CUHS also won the sectional 1978 title in the 8-man football division. The school has also won numerous league championships.

Two of the town's most recent NCAA Division I products include Quentin Cate, a former Horizon League Baseball Player of the Week, and Jeb Heavenrich, a football player for Princeton.

== Infrastructure ==
The community gets its water supply from wells that tap San Simeon and Santa Rosa creeks. The area is vulnerable to shortages due to the reliance on an unstable network of creeks, lakes and State Water Project allocations. The Cambria Community Services District is building a treatment plant to treat brackish water and return it to the aquifer. The water is a combination of groundwater, percolated wastewater treatment plant effluent, mixed with fresh water and salt water. The $9.13 million water treatment plant has critics who contend it will damage the delicate ecosystem, particularly San Simeon Creek lagoon, and burden ratepayers for years.

== Notable people ==
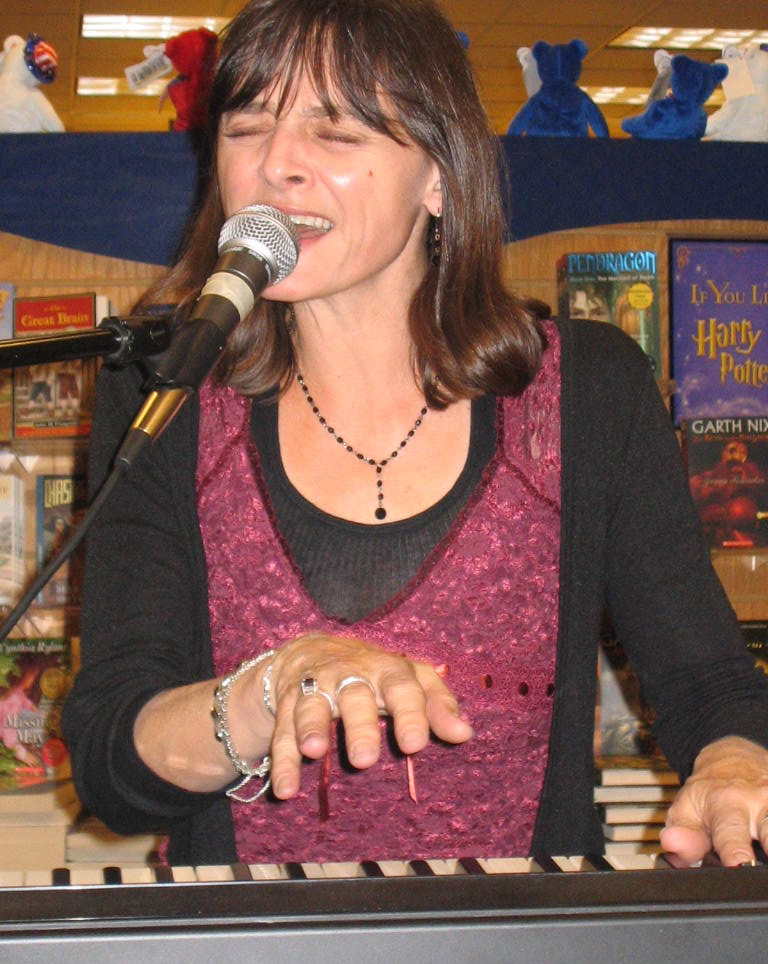
Jude Johnstone performing in South Portland, Maine, 2005

- Bradford Angier, survivalist writer
- Red Holloway, saxophonist
- Peter Horton, actor, producer
- Catherine Ryan Hyde, author
- Jude Johnstone, singer-songwriter (former resident)
- Warren Leopold, architect and painter
- Kerrigan Mahan, American voice actor
- Christopher Moore, author
- S. J. Main Muñoz, director
- George Papashvily, author, sculptor
- Nehemiah Persoff, actor
- Charlie Shoemake, vibraphonist
- Paul Squibb, Founder of Midland School, Los Olivos, California
