= Hearst San Simeon State Park =

State park of California, United States

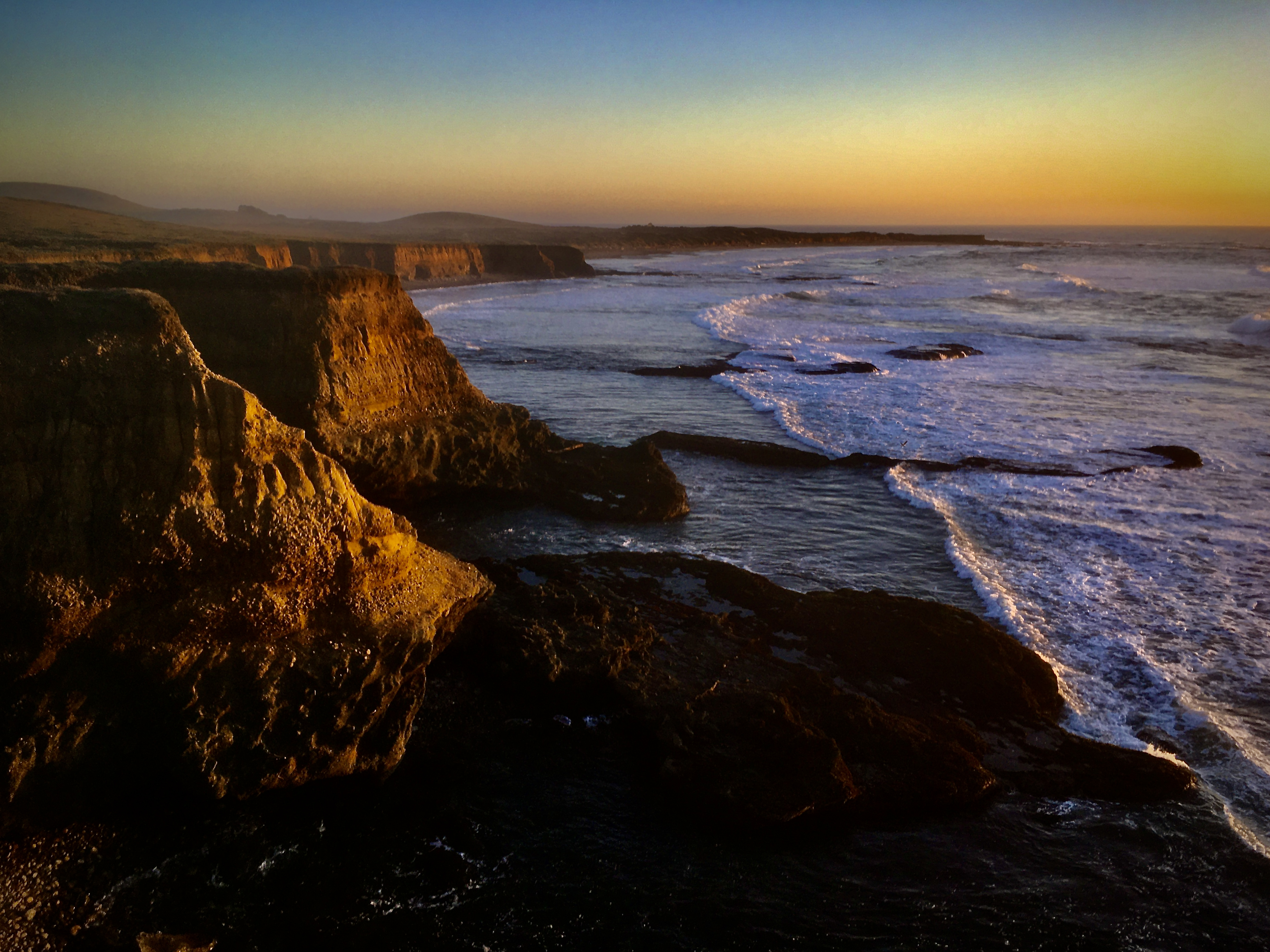
- Looking South to Pt. Sierra Nevada at the Golden Hour, northern part of the park

- Location within California Location within the United States
- Location: San Luis Obispo County, California, United States
- Nearest city: San Simeon, California
- Coordinates: 35°35′01″N 121°07′18″W
- Area: 2,309 acres (934 ha)
- Established: 1932
- Governing body: California Department of Parks and Recreation

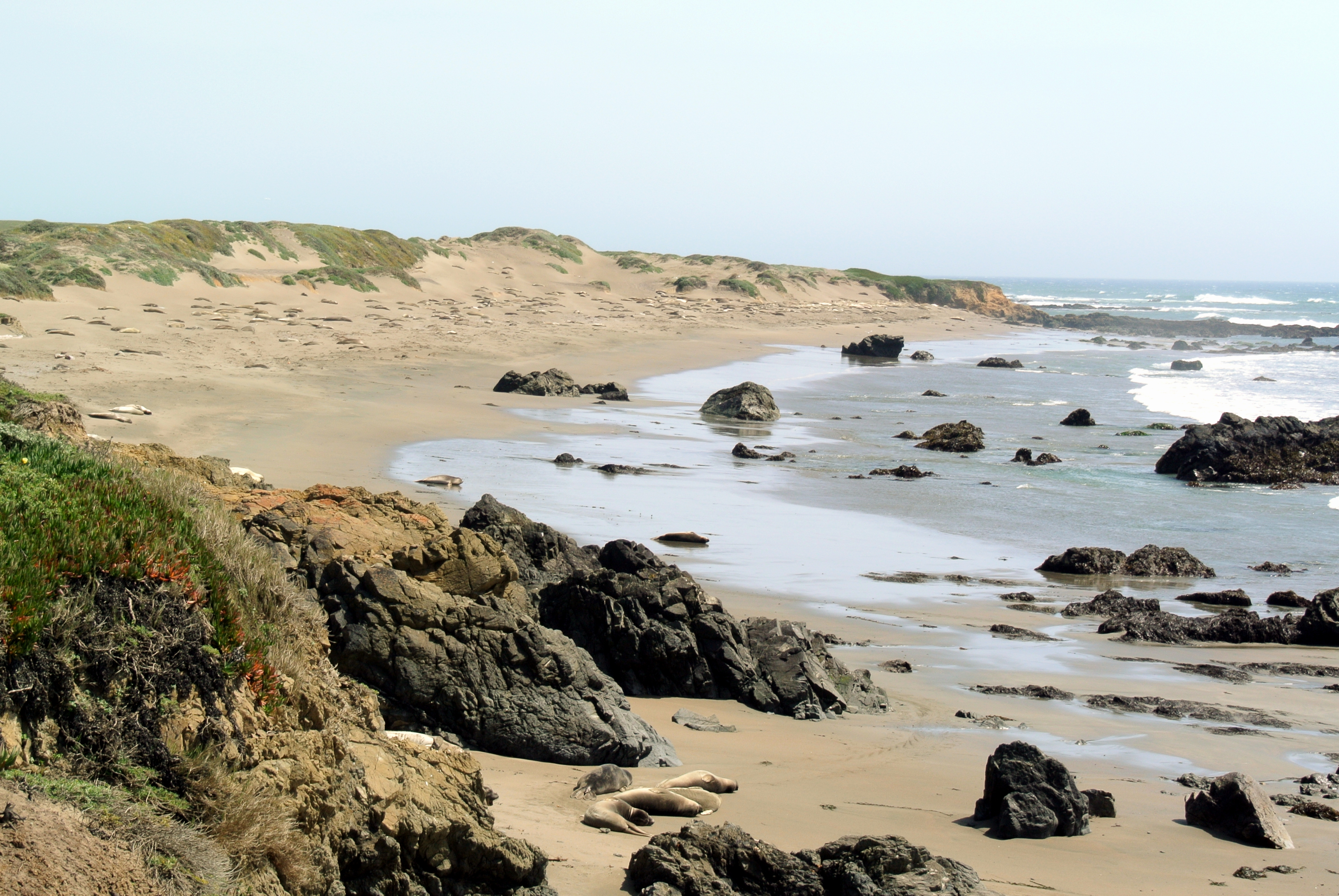
Piedras Blancas State Marine Conservation Area and seal colony

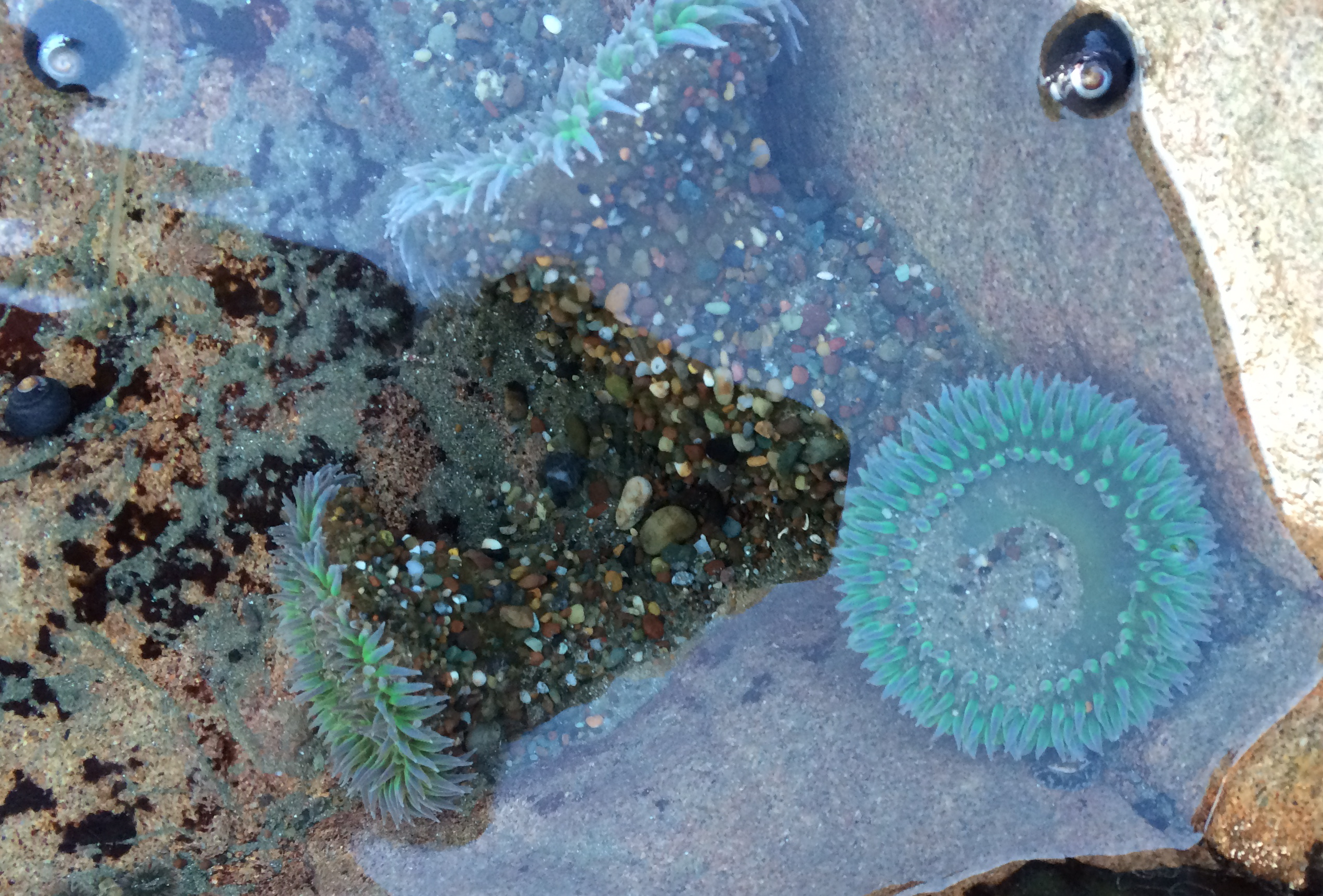
Tidepool at North Moonstone beach, in the southern part of the State Park. Giant Green anemones with black tegula snails.

Hearst San Simeon State Park is a state park of California, United States, preserving rocky coast and rare habitats. It is located between Cambria and San Simeon. The 3,409-acre (1,380 ha) park was first established in 1932. The park includes the Santa Rosa Creek Natural Preserve, the San Simeon Natural Preserve and the Pa-nu Cultural Preserve, which were established in 1990.

A 3.3-mile (5.3 km) trail runs through parts of the San Simeon Natural Preserve and the Washburn Campground. The trail includes scenic overlooks, rest-stop benches and interpretive panels with information on wildlife and habitat. A portion of the trail along the seasonal wetland is wheelchair accessible.

Santa Rosa Creek Preserve is an area that includes valuable riparian forests and coastal wetlands, which provide habitat for endangered tidewater goby.

San Simeon Natural Preserve consists of vast wetlands, riparian zones, and several undisturbed native plant communities, including unique mima mound topography. The Preserve is also the wintering site for monarch butterfly populations.

In 2005 an additional 1,100 acres (445 ha) of coastal lands were added to the state park following an easement agreement and property exchange with the neighboring Hearst Ranch.

== Prehistory ==
The 13.7-acre (55,000 m^{2}) Pa-nu Cultural Preserve contains the most significant archeological site within Hearst San Simeon State Park. The site has been dated to 5850 years before the present, and it contains significant evidence documenting prehistoric technology, subsistence practices and social organization over the course of several centuries.

Prehistorically this entire general area of the central coast was inhabited by the Chumash people, who settled the coastal San Luis Obispo area approximately 10,000 to 11,000 BCE, including a large village to the south at Morro Creek.

== Nearby protected areas ==
Hearst San Simeon State Historical Monument contains Hearst Castle. Cambria State Marine Conservation Area and White Rock (Cambria) State Marine Conservation Area are marine protected areas offshore from San Simeon campground. Nearby ocean waters are also a part of the Monterey Bay National Marine Sanctuary, where visitors can learn more at the Coastal Discovery Center at San Simeon Bay, located at Hearst Beach. A large elephant seal rookery is found on many beaches of Hearst San Simeon State Park. Adjacent to the northern stretches of the park are the Piedras Blancas State Marine Reserve, and the Piedras Blancas Light Station.

== See also ==
- List of California state parks
