= Cambria State Marine Conservation Area =

Marine protected area in California

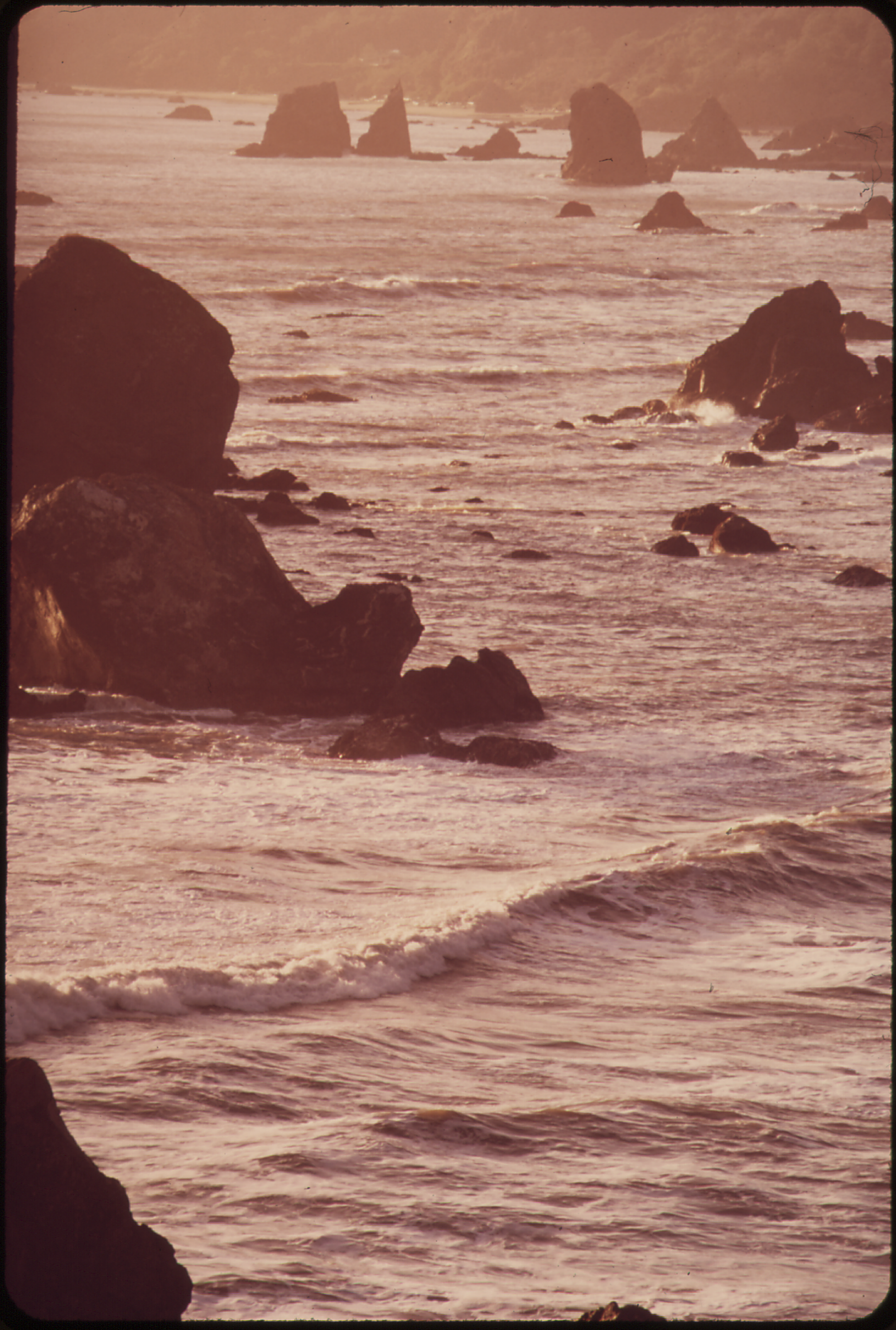
Cambria area shore

Cambria State Marine Conservation Area (SMCA) is a marine protected area located off the coast of the city of Cambria, California on California’s central coast in San Luis Obispo County, California. The marine protected area covers 6.26 square miles (16.2 km^{2}). Within the SMCA recreational fishing and take is allowed while commercial fishing and take of all living marine resources is prohibited.

== History ==
Cambria State Marine Conservation Area was established in September 2007 by the California Department of Fish & Game. It was one of 29 marine protected areas adopted during the first phase of the Marine Life Protection Act Initiative. The Marine Life Protection Act Initiative (or MLPAI) is a collaborative public process to create a statewide network of marine protected areas along the California coastline.

== Geography and natural features ==
Cambria SMCA is located off the coast of Cambria and adjoins White Rock (Cambria) State Marine Conservation Area. The SMCA is offshore from San Simeon State Park.

This marine protected area is bounded by the mean high tide line and straight lines connecting the following points in the order listed:

1. 35°37.10′N 121°09.20′W
2. 35°37.10′N 121°10.70′W
3. 35°32.85′N 121°06.70′W and
4. 35°32.85′N 121°05.85′W.

== Habitat and wildlife ==
Key habitats protected within the SMCA include steelhead streams, kelp forest, rocky intertidal zone, sandy and cobble beach, reef and sandy bottom, pinnacles and offshore rocks. The area is home to various wildlife including sea otters and birds.

== Recreation and nearby attractions ==
The adjacent San Simeon State Park provides scenic and recreational opportunities for year-round visitors. Hiking, fishing, surfing and whale watching are among these opportunities. There are two campgrounds within the park, one primitive.

Hearst Castle, former home of William Randolph Hearst, is at nearby Hearst San Simeon State Historic Monument and offers visitor tours.

California’s marine protected areas encourage recreational and educational uses of the ocean. Activities such as kayaking, diving, snorkeling, and swimming are allowed unless otherwise restricted.

== Scientific monitoring ==
As specified by the Marine Life Protection Act, select marine protected areas along California’s central coast are being monitored by scientists to track their effectiveness and learn more about ocean health. Similar studies in marine protected areas located off of the Santa Barbara Channel Islands have already detected gradual improvements in fish size and number.

Local scientific and educational institutions involved in the monitoring include Stanford University’s Hopkins Marine Station, University of California Santa Cruz, Moss Landing Marine Laboratories and Cal Poly San Luis Obispo. Research methods include hook-and-line sampling, intertidal and scuba diver surveys, and the use of Remote Operated Vehicle (ROV) submarines.
