= Paul Squibb (educator) =

American educator (1895–1984)

- Born: 29 December 1895; Brooklyn, New York, US
- Died: 10 May 1984 (aged 88)
- Education: Harvard University
- Occupation: Educator
- Known for: Founding Midland School

Paul Squibb was an American educator who founded Midland School in 1932, a private college preparatory school in California.

== Biography ==
Paul Squibb was born on 29 December 1895 in Brooklyn, New York.

Squibb was from Bernardsville, New Jersey. He was the grandson of E. R. Squibb. He graduated from Kent School in 1914 and Harvard University.

After retiring from Midland School, Paul and his wife Louise Groves Squibb retired to Cambria, California. Mr. Squibb was active in recording the history of Cambria.

Paul Squibb died 10 May 1984.
