= Midland School, Los Olivos, California =

Coordinates: 34°43′55″N 120°5′14″W

Midland School

Location
- 5100 Figueroa Mountain Road; Los Olivos, California 93441; United States

Information
- Type: Private, Boarding
- Motto: In Robore Virtus (Our Strength Lies in the Oak)
- Established: 1932
- Head of school: Hannah Nelson
- Faculty: 20
- Enrollment: 80 total (co-ed); 100% boarding
- Average class size: 11 students
- Student to teacher ratio: 4:1
- Colors: Green and black
- Athletics: 4 Interscholastic Sports
- Mascot: Oak Tree
- Website: www.midland-school.org

Midland School is a small, co-ed, outdoor education, preparatory boarding school for grades 9 to 12 in Los Olivos, California. Midland was founded in 1932 by Kent School and Harvard graduate Paul Squibb. Squibb envisioned a small, rural community reliant on the work of its inhabitants to meet its basic needs. Squibb and his wife, Louise, founded Midland in the midst of the Great Depression, believing that the essentials of education are a student, a teacher, and an idea.

== Campus and surroundings ==
The school is located on 2,860 acres (12 km²) of largely undeveloped ranchland (formerly part of Rancho La Laguna) characteristic of central California's coastal hill country. The main part of the campus is split up into living yards and academic spaces called Lower Yard, Middle Yard, and Upper Yard. The school also has a 10-acre organic farm and garden, grazing land for steers, and a horseback riding facility. Students live in cabins which are heated by small wood stoves. Until 2022 when the school changed over to solar-powered water heaters, students chopped wood to make fires to heat their shower water.

Some 25 percent of Midland's electricity needs are met with grid-tied, student-installed solar arrays. Several campus buildings, including on-campus faculty housing, were constructed decades ago by students and faculty.

Midland is approximately 50 minutes by car from Santa Barbara. It is two hours' drive north of Los Angeles and five hours' drive south of the San Francisco Bay Area. The property neighbors the Los Padres National Forest, the largest national forest in California, and is also adjacent to the San Rafael Wilderness Area, home of the Manzana River and its tributaries.

== Student jobs ==
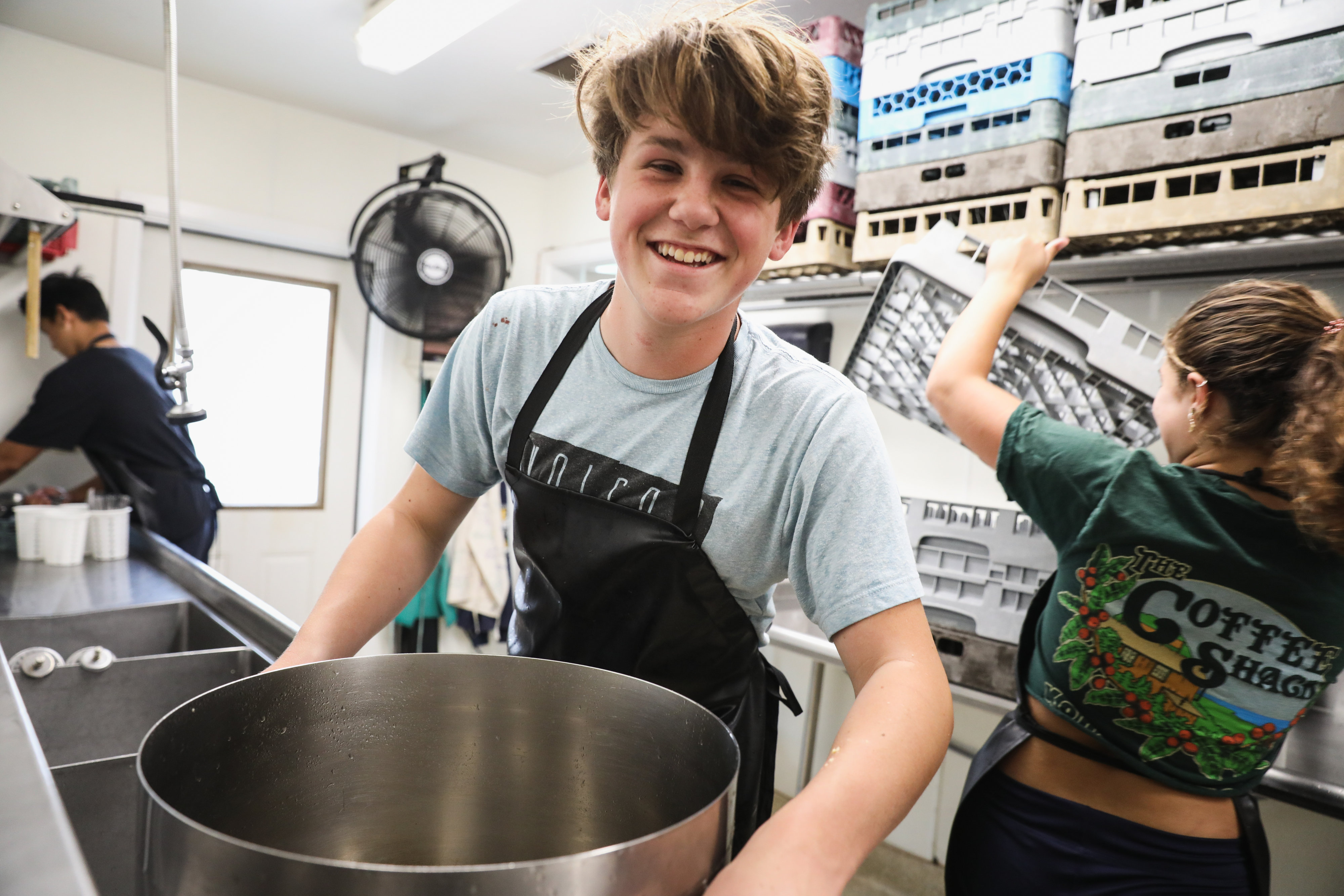
Midland School students participate in Dish House as part of the jobs program.

An integral part of Midland's philosophy is self-reliance, and students and faculty perform much of the work that goes into maintaining the school. All students have daily jobs that are an essential part of school operations.

== Farm-to-table and Ranch-to-table programs ==
The school has a 10-acre (40,000 m^{2}) organic garden. Students help with planting, cultivating, and harvesting the fruits and vegetable that are delivered to the school kitchen or donated to local food pantries. The produce from the garden, orchard, and farm provide about 50% of the food eaten by this California boarding school community. The school also raises grass-fed steers for beef. Students help by moving cattle on horseback and taking part in all parts of the ranching cycle around the property.

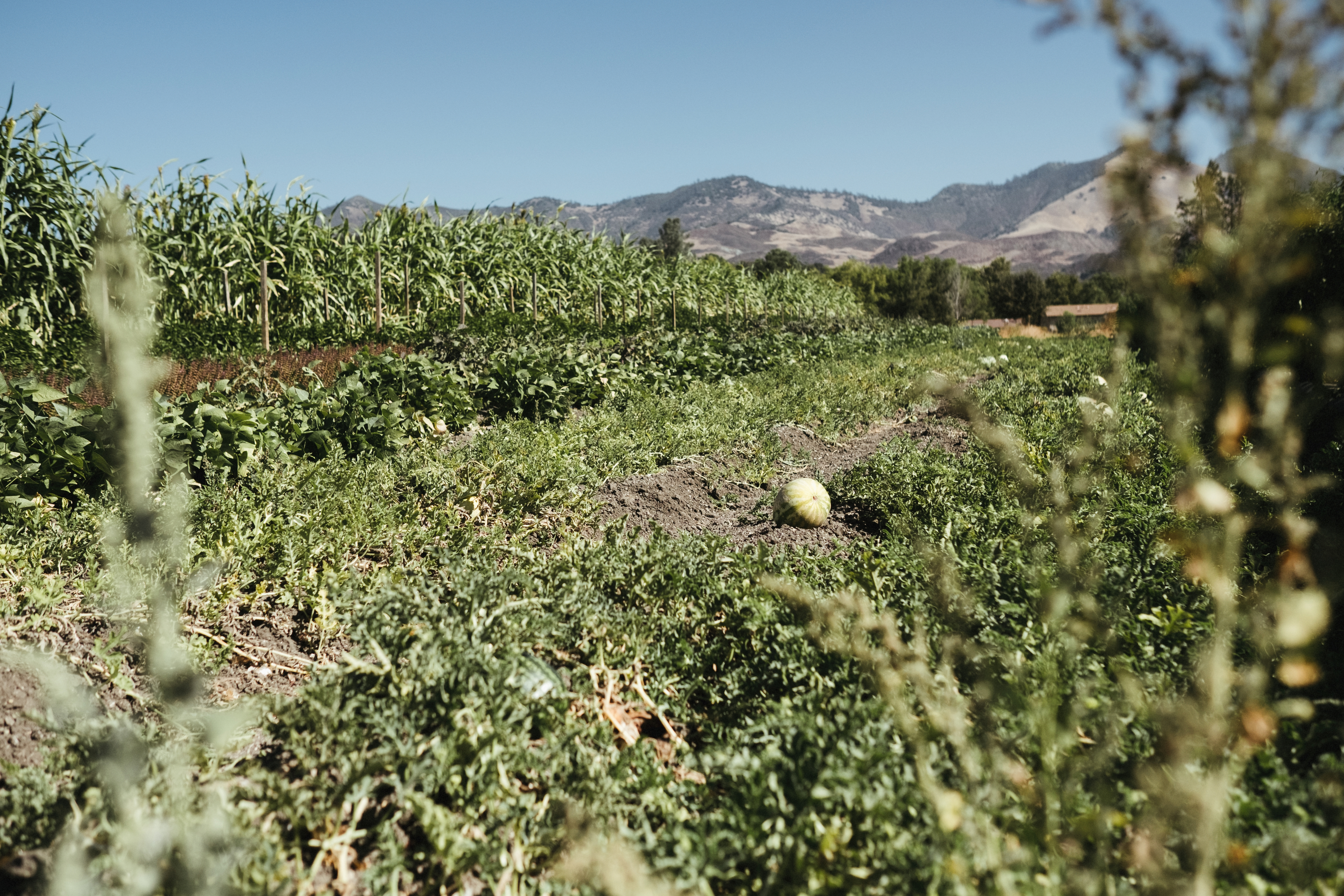
Midland School's 10-acre organic farm & garden

== Athletics & activities ==
The athletic program is based around fall, winter and spring seasons. Students are required to participate in one competitive sport per year, in order to promote cooperation and athleticism. Soccer, volleyball, cross-country running, and basketball are offered as competitive options. Midland School competes in the private, college preparatory Condor League.

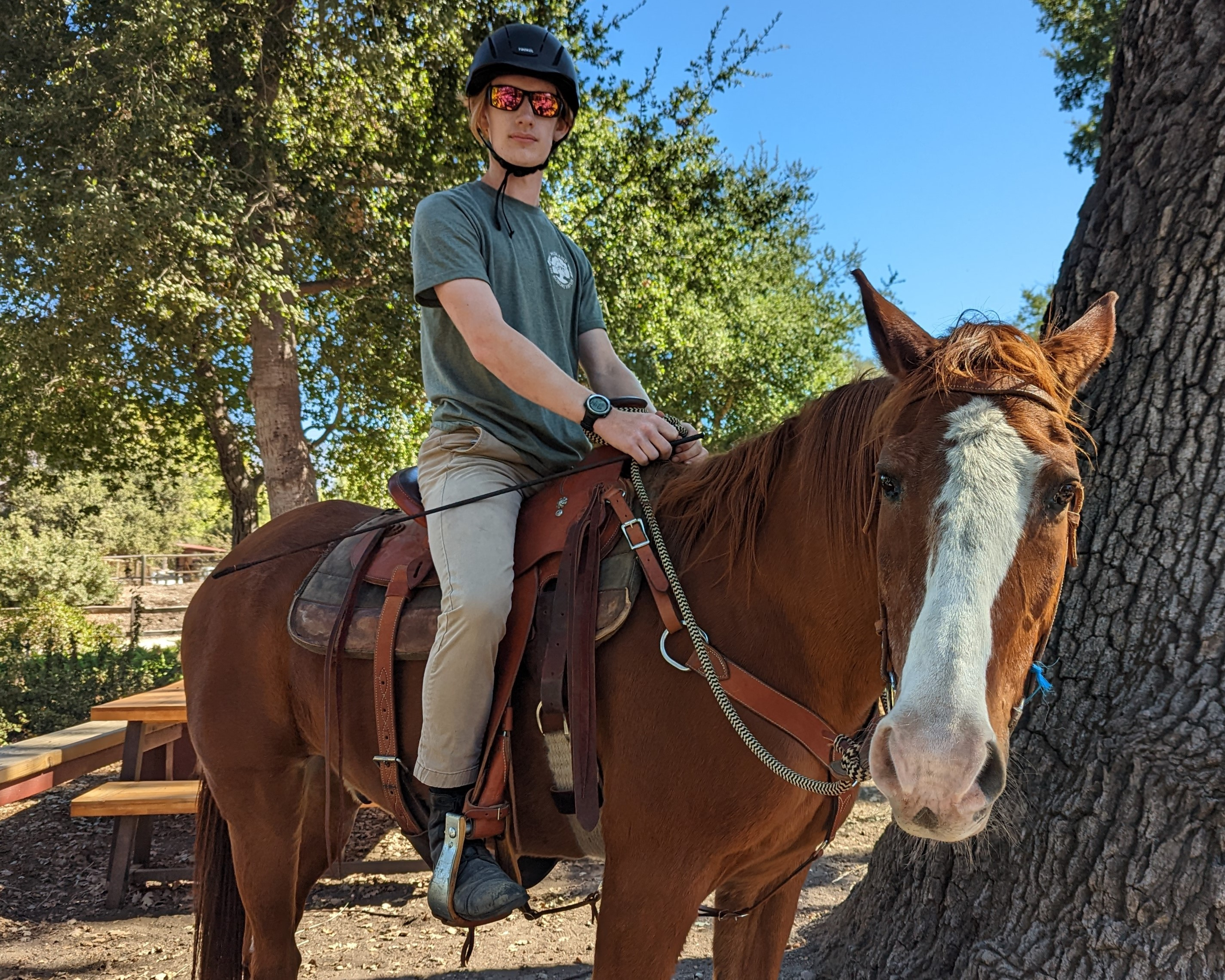
A student rides a horse to mid-morning assembly at Midland School.

Students also may elect to spend time in one of Midland's non-competitive athletics programs. Students may work in the campus’ 10-acre (40,000 m^{2}) organic farm, explore the outdoors and build leadership skills, explore circus arts, learn to surf, or join the school's natural horsemanship program.

== Governance, accreditation and endowment ==
The school is a non-profit organization governed by a 16-member Board of Trustees. The estimated value of Midland's property is $15,000,000 and the school's growing endowment is currently approaching $4,000,000. Annual giving generally yields $300,000, the bulk of which helps fund Midland's substantial financial aid program. In 2015–2016, Midland awarded over $1 million in need-based financial aid to 47% of the student body.

Midland is accredited through 2024 by the Western Association of Schools and Colleges (WASC), and is a member of the National Association of Independent Schools, the California Association of Independent Schools, The Association of Boarding Schools (TABS) Midland School, the Western Boarding Schools Association, A Better Chance, Inc., The Council for the Advancement and Support of Education, the California Interscholastic Federation, and the National Association for College Admission Counseling.

== Awards ==
- 2005 - Santa Barbara County Green Award
- 2009 - Governor's Award for Environmental and Economic Leadership (GEELA)
- 2012 - Edward E. Ford Foundation Grant
- 2022 - IAC Outstanding Achievement in Internet Advertising

== Noted alumni and faculty ==
- Steve Baer, Class of 1956. Baer is the Founder, Chairman of the Board, President, and Director of Research at Zomeworks Corporation.
- Bill Bertka, former basketball coach at Midland. Retired NBA assistant coach and NBA executive.
- Billy Childs, Class of 1975, jazz pianist and two-time Grammy winner in 2006.
- Michael Clarke Rubel (1940–2007), Class of 1957, builder of Glendora's Rubel Castle, an unconventional monolith of stone and recycled materials.
- Charles Webb, Class of 1957, the author of the novel The Graduate. Webb donated the principal funds for a wing of the school library in the late 1970s.
