= White Rock (Cambria) State Marine Conservation Area =

Marine protected area off the coast of Cambria, California

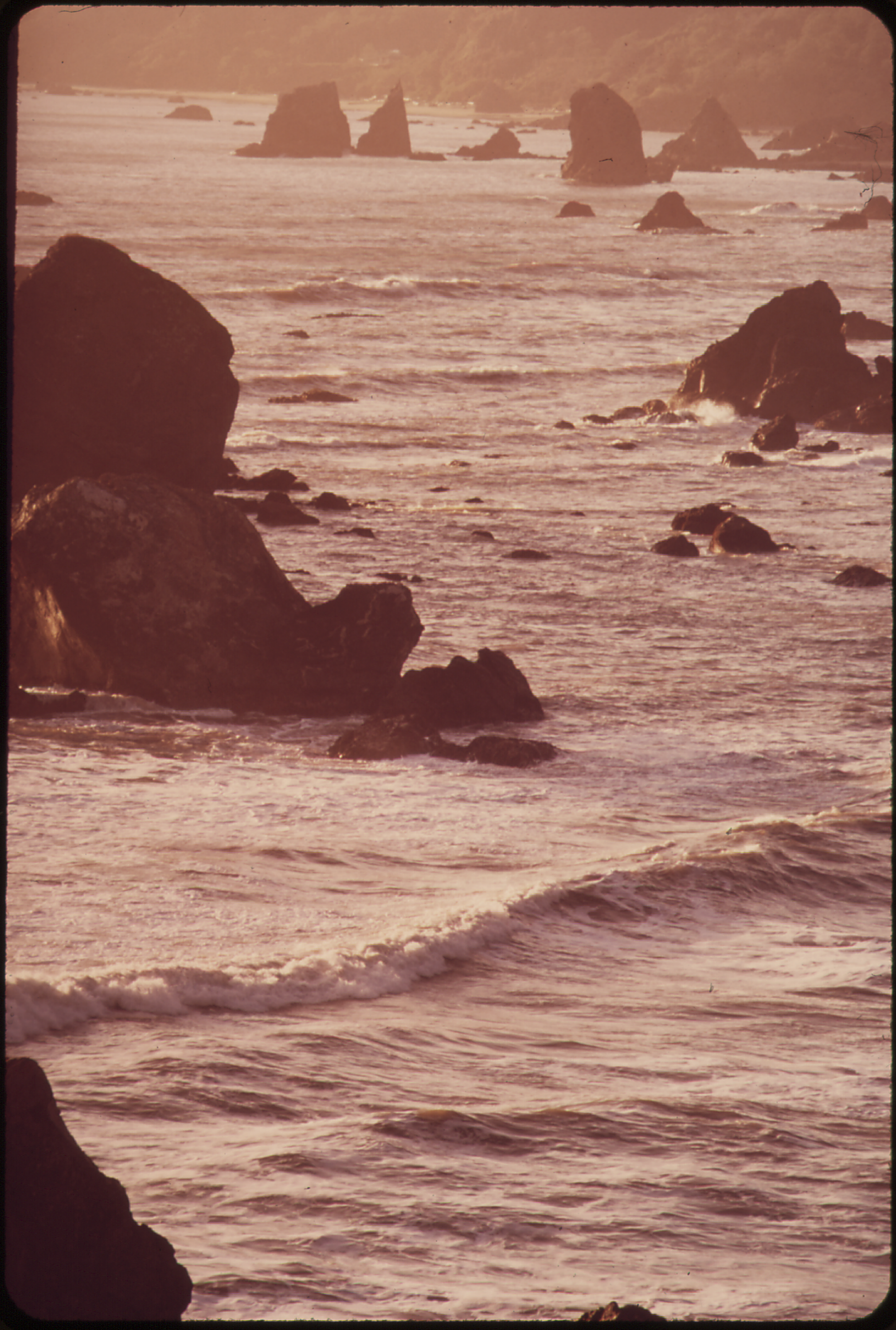
Cambria area shore

White Rock (Cambria) State Marine Conservation Area (SMCA) is a marine protected area located off the coast of the city of Cambria, California on California’s central coast. The marine protected area covers 2.32 square miles (6.0 km^{2}). Within the SMCA the take of all living marine resources is prohibited except the commercial take of giant kelp and bull kelp under certain conditions.

== History ==
White Rock (Cambria) SMCA was established in September 2007 by the California Department of Fish & Game. It was one of 29 marine protected areas adopted during the first phase of the Marine Life Protection Act Initiative. The Marine Life Protection Act Initiative (or MLPAI) is a collaborative public process to create a statewide network of marine protected areas along the California coastline.

== Geography and natural features ==
White Rock (Cambria) SMCA is located off the coast of Cambria and adjoins Cambria State Marine Conservation Area. The SMCA is offshore from the Kenneth S. Norris Rancho Marino Reserve, part of the University of California Natural Reserve System.

This marine protected area is bounded by the mean high tide line and straight lines connecting the following points in the order listed:

35°32.85′N 121°5.85′W,

35° 32.85’ N. lat. 121° 06.70’ W. long.;

35° 30.50’ N. lat. 121° 05.00’ W. long.; and

35° 30.50’ N. lat. 121° 03.40’ W. long.

== Habitat and wildlife ==
Key habitats protected within the SMCA include kelp forests, rocky intertidal zone, reef and sandy bottom, pinnacles and offshore rocks. The area is home to various wildlife including sea otters, sea lions, harbor seals and birds.

== Recreation and nearby attractions ==
San Simeon Park, which adjoins the Cambria SMCA, just to the north of White Rock (Cambria) SMCA, provides recreational opportunities for year-round visitors, including hiking, fishing, surfing and whale watching. San Simeon State Park to the north has a campground.

Hearst Castle, former home of William Randolph Hearst, is at nearby Hearst San Simeon State Historical Monument and offers visitor tours.

Elephant Seals can be viewed at Piedras Blancas 10 miles to the north.

California’s marine protected areas encourage recreational and educational uses of the ocean. Activities such as kayaking, diving, snorkeling, and swimming are allowed unless otherwise restricted.

== Scientific monitoring ==
As specified by the Marine Life Protection Act, select marine protected areas along California’s central coast are being monitored by scientists to track their effectiveness and learn more about ocean health. Similar studies in marine protected areas located off of the Santa Barbara Channel Islands have already detected gradual improvements in fish size and number. Local institutions involved in the monitoring include Stanford University’s Hopkins Marine Station, University of California Santa Cruz, Moss Landing Marine Laboratories and Cal Poly San Luis Obispo. Research methods include hook-and-line sampling, intertidal and scuba diver surveys, fish traps and the use of Remote Operated Vehicle (ROV) submarines.
