= List of tourist attractions in Monterey County, California =

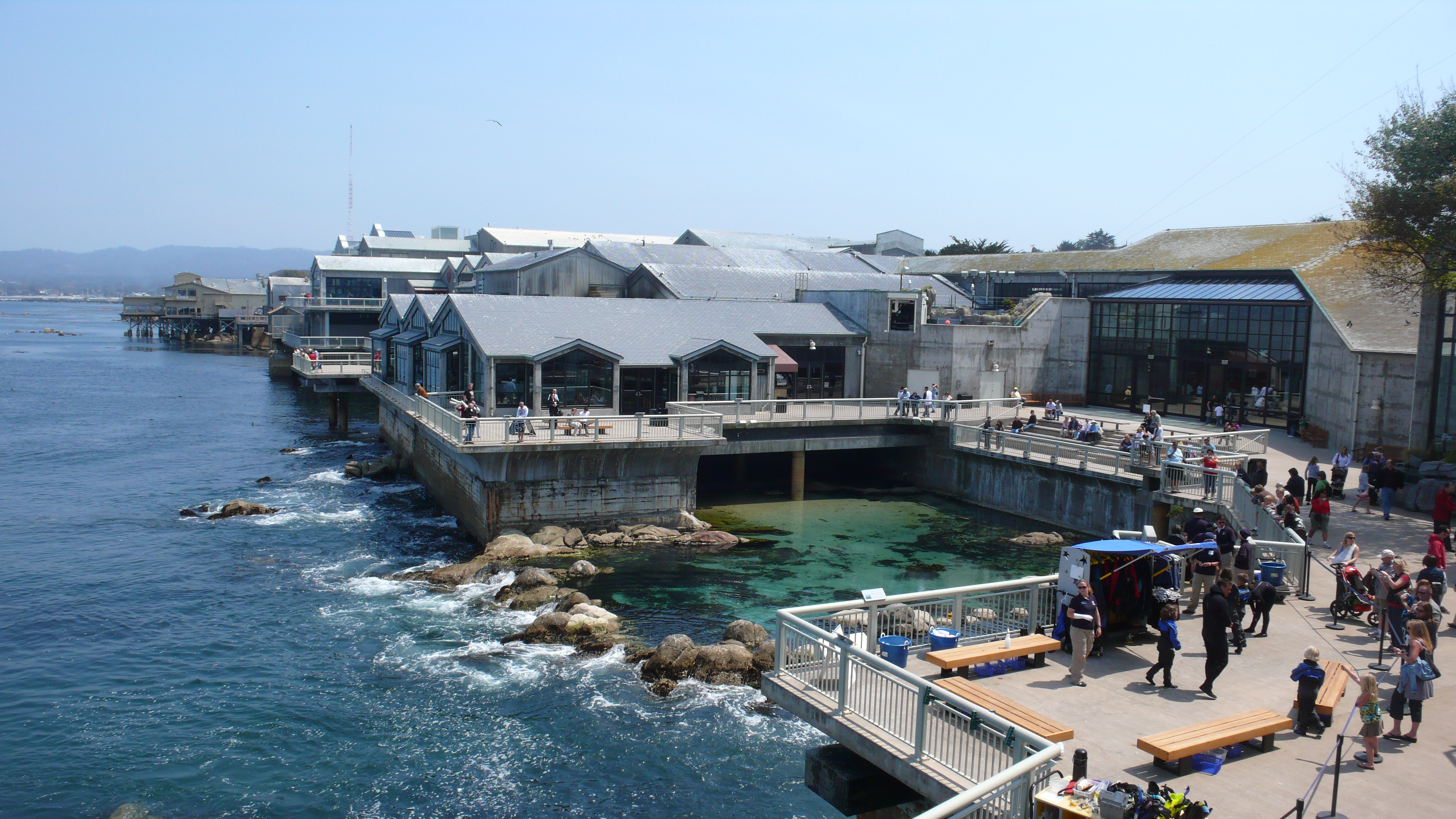
The Monterey Aquarium is one of Monterey County's most visited attractions.

Monterey County is a county on the Pacific coast of the U.S. state of California, its northwestern section forming the southern half of Monterey Bay. The population of the county in 2021 was 437,325. The coastline of Monterey County includes Big Sur, Highway 1, and the scenic 17 Mile Drive in Pacific Grove and Carmel that traces the perimeter of the Monterey Peninsula. Tourism is an important part of the economy in the coastal regions of Monterey county, although agriculture is more dominant in the inland Salinas Valley.

The first people to live in the Monterey Bay Area were the Ohlone. Ancient shell mounds in the Bay Area suggest human settlements were established about 4000 BCE. Spanish explorers first landed in Monterey in 1602, and the city of Monterey was the capital of California while it was under Spanish and Mexican rule. There are also a variety of historic Catholic mission churches, some dating as far back as the 18th century. Monterey has a rich history and is one of California's most historically important cities. The Monterey Bay is also an important marine environment due to its unusual geography and high biological diversity, and the entire coast of Monterey County (as well as the coast north to the San Francisco Bay) is designated the Monterey Bay National Marine Sanctuary. The Monterey Bay has a high concentration of species, many of which are found nowhere else in the world. Monterey Bay also features an underwater canyon, Monterey Canyon, that is as deep as the Grand Canyon, and which makes the waters of the Bay nutrient-rich, helping support an ecosystem that includes large mammals such as whales and dolphins, as well as sharks (including Great white sharks). The close proximity of the canyon to the shore has greatly facilitated scientific research of deep sea environments, and Monterey County is home to a variety of world-class marine research institutions, as well as the world-famous Monterey Bay Aquarium. The Monterey Bay provides many recreational opportunities for tourists, including scuba diving, surfing, swimming, fishing, and sailing.

Monterey County has also held strategic importance, both historically and currently. It is home to several former and current U.S. military installations and facilities, including Fort Ord, a decommissioned Army base that housed soldiers going through basic training during World War II; the Defense Language Institute, which provides foreign language training in over a dozen languages for U.S. and foreign military, U.S. government, and law enforcement personnel; and the Naval Postgraduate School, which is operated by the Navy and which offers graduate degrees to U.S. military and Department of Defense personnel. Monterey County's significant military population and presence, as well as its abundance of research institutions focused on marine environments, and the proximity to the Bay Area, mean the county attracts a significant number of visitors associated with the military.

Several artists have called Monterey County home, including writer and Nobel prize laureate John Steinbeck (Salinas and Pacific Grove), writer Robert Louis Stevenson (Pacific Grove), surrealist painter Salvador Dalí (Monterey), and California poet Robinson Jeffers (Carmel-by-the-Sea).

== Historic sites ==
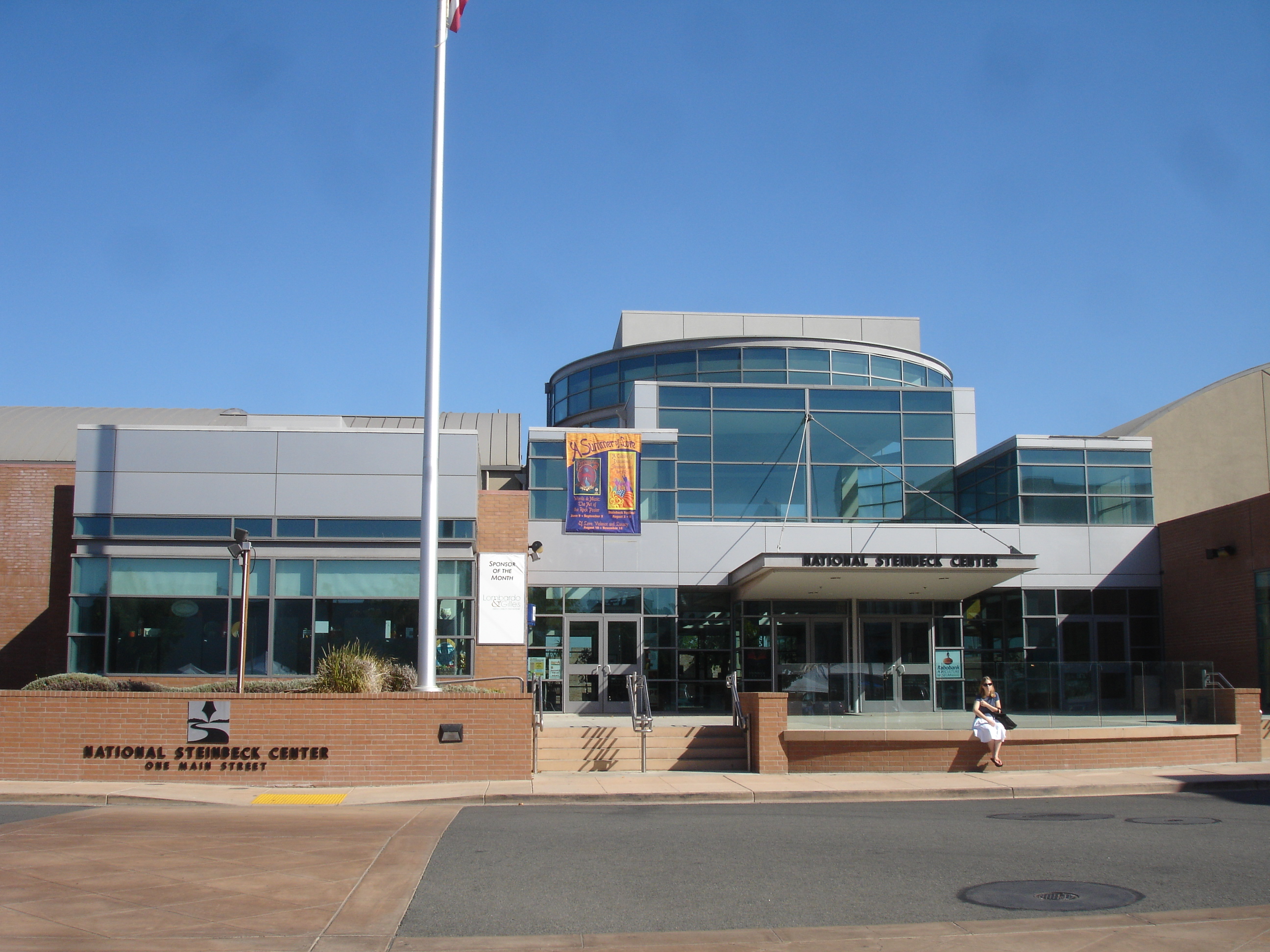
National Steinbeck Center in Steinbeck's hometown, Salinas

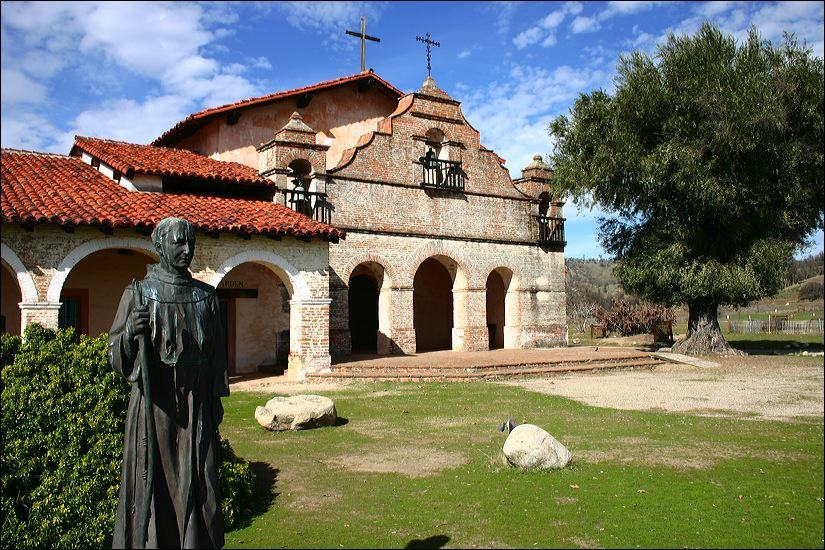
The reconstructed Mission San Antonio de Padua as it appeared in 2006. The baked brick Campanario is unique among the Missions.

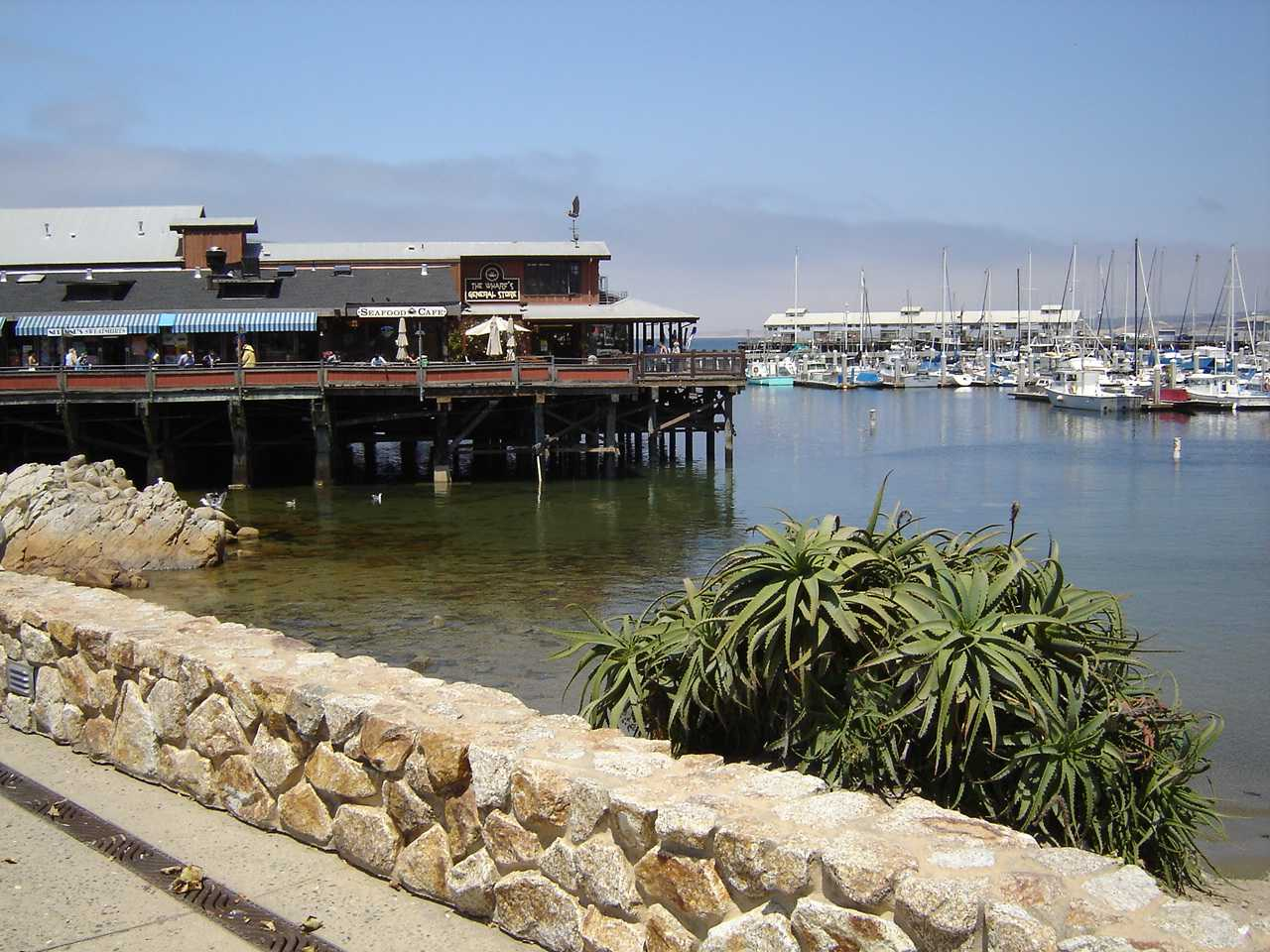
Fisherman's Wharf and the Monterey Marina

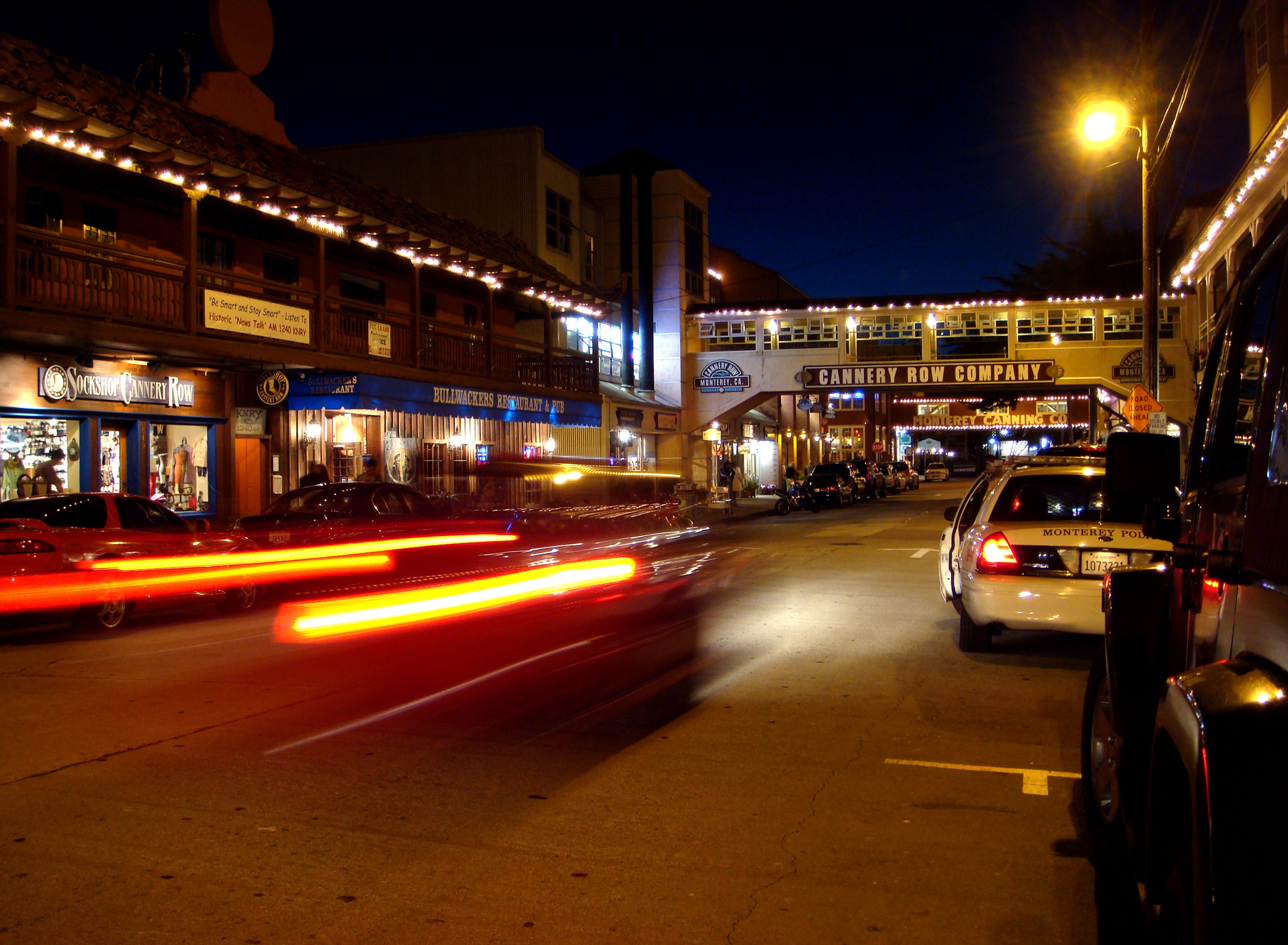
Cannery Row Monterey

=== Historic buildings ===
- Asilomar Conference Grounds – historic conference center in Pacific Grove, built in 1913 to 1929 for the Young Women's Christian Association, and designed by architect Julia Morgan
- Colton Hall – historic Monterey house where the Constitution of California was designed and signed
- Eucalyptus Tree Row – roadside grove of 33 historic, 130+ year old Eucalyptus globus trees on the right-of-way of Boronda Road in Carmel Valley, California
- First theater in California – the first theater in California, located in Monterey
- Gosby House Inn – inn located in downtown Pacific Grove. The inn was first built in 1887, and has evolved from a boarding house to a Queen Anne bed and breakfast. Still in operation.
- Governor Juan Bautista Alvarado House, California Historical Landmark number #348, is an adobe house.
- Larkin House – historic Spanish Colonial and New England–style home located in Monterey. This home is believed to be the first two-story residence in California. Features an outdoor garden.
- Monterey State Historic Park – includes historic locations such as the Custom House, the first government building in California
- Old Monterey Jail – Monterey city jail, used from 1854 to 1956. Located adjacent to Colton Hall.
- Point Pinos Lighthouse – lighthouse on the tip of the Monterey Peninsula in Pacific Grove that is the oldest continuously operating lighthouse on the West Coast of the United States. Houses a museum and other exhibits.
- Point Sur Lighthouse at the Point Sur State Historic Park – lighthouse on the Big Sur coastline of Monterey County
- Samuel M. Black House – an historic Queen Anne home in Salinas, notable for its degree of preservation, and for the preservation of the original plans for the house drawn by architect W. H. Weeks.
- Whalers Cabin – historical cabin used by whalers at Point Lobos. Adjacent to a museum with artifacts and displays about the history of Point Lobos.

=== Historic mission churches ===
- Mission Nuestra Señora de la Soledad (also known as the Soledad Mission)
- Mission San Antonio de Padua
- Mission San Carlos Borromeo de Carmelo (also known as the Carmel Mission) – an historic Catholic mission church first built in 1797 and founded by Saint Junípero Serra, who is buried there. (Serra was canonized by the Catholic Church in 2015.)

=== Literary sites ===
- Cannery Row – street featuring restaurants and shops that formerly housed a number of now-defunct sardine canning factories; John Steinbeck's novel Cannery Row was set there. Located at the boundary of Pacific Grove and Monterey.
- John Steinbeck House – Salinas birthplace and family home of John Steinbeck featuring notable Queen Anne architecture. Now a restaurant and museum.
- National Steinbeck Center – museum and memorial dedicated to John Steinbeck, in Salinas, his birthplace.
- Robert Louis Stevenson House – an 1840s adobe house in Pacific Grove where Robert Louis Stevenson resided in late 1879.
- Tor House and Hawk Tower – longtime home of poet Robinson Jeffers, consisting of a granite masonry house and 40 foot tower that were hand-built beginning in 1919

== Museums ==
=== Art ===
- Alvarado Gallery – city art exhibit gallery in the Monterey Conference Center
- Monterey County Youth Museum
- Monterey Museum of Art
- Picard Trade Bead Museum and African Art Gallery – history and aesthetic display of beads traded in Africa throughout the centuries

=== History ===
- Boronda History Center – Spanish Colonial adobe and wood home of José Eusebio Boronda. Located northwest of Salinas.
- Camp Roberts Historical Museum – museum located on the Camp Roberts California National Guard post. Open to the public.
- Museum of Monterey
- Presidio of Monterey Museum – museum describing the history of the Presidio Army base and the role of the military in Monterey. Located in Lower Presidio Historic Park, this museum is open to the public.

=== Science ===
- Hopkins Marine Station
- Pacific Grove Museum of Natural History

== Arboretums and gardens ==
- Casa del Oro Sensory and Herb Garden – a small scenic plant garden. Features herb plants, designed to teach people what herbs look like before they are dried and packaged, as well as a variety of colors, tastes, scents, and textures.
- Casa Soberanes Garden – a garden with terraced walkways lined with abalone shells and wine bottles. Located at Casa Soberanes, the "House of the Blue Gate."
- Custom House Cactus Garden – a small collection of cacti gathered from parts of the Southwest in the 1920s. This garden is located on the grounds of the Custom House at the Monterey State Historic Park, the oldest government building in California.
- First Theater in California Garden – a garden located next to the First Theater in California, consisting of various succulents and large Monterey Cypress trees.
- Lester Rowntree Native Plant Garden – garden located in Carmel.
- Memory Garden – a scenic flower garden popular with photographers and for weddings. This garden is located on the grounds of the Monterey State Historic Park.
- Pacific Grove Marine Gardens State Marine Conservation Area – underwater marine garden, located on the tip of the Monterey Peninsula in Pacific Grove.

== Public golf courses ==
- Bayonet and Black Horse Golf Course – originally a golf course for the now-decommissioned Fort Ord, this challenging pair of links is located in Seaside, California.
- Pebble Beach Links – a world-famous golf course featuring dramatic views of the ocean, this course hosts the PGA Tour Pro-Am in the winter, and a US Open. Also the site of the annual Pebble Beach Concours d'Elegance auto show, which has been held in Pebble Beach since 1950.
- Pacific Grove Municipal Golf Links – notable as one of the only affordable municipal golf courses on the Monterey Peninsula, this course, located in Pacific Grove, California, was partly designed by Jack Neville, who also designed Pebble Beach Links.
- Poppy Hills Golf Course – golf course located in Pebble Beach, California
- Spyglass Hill Golf Course – golf course located in Pebble Beach

== Cultural ==
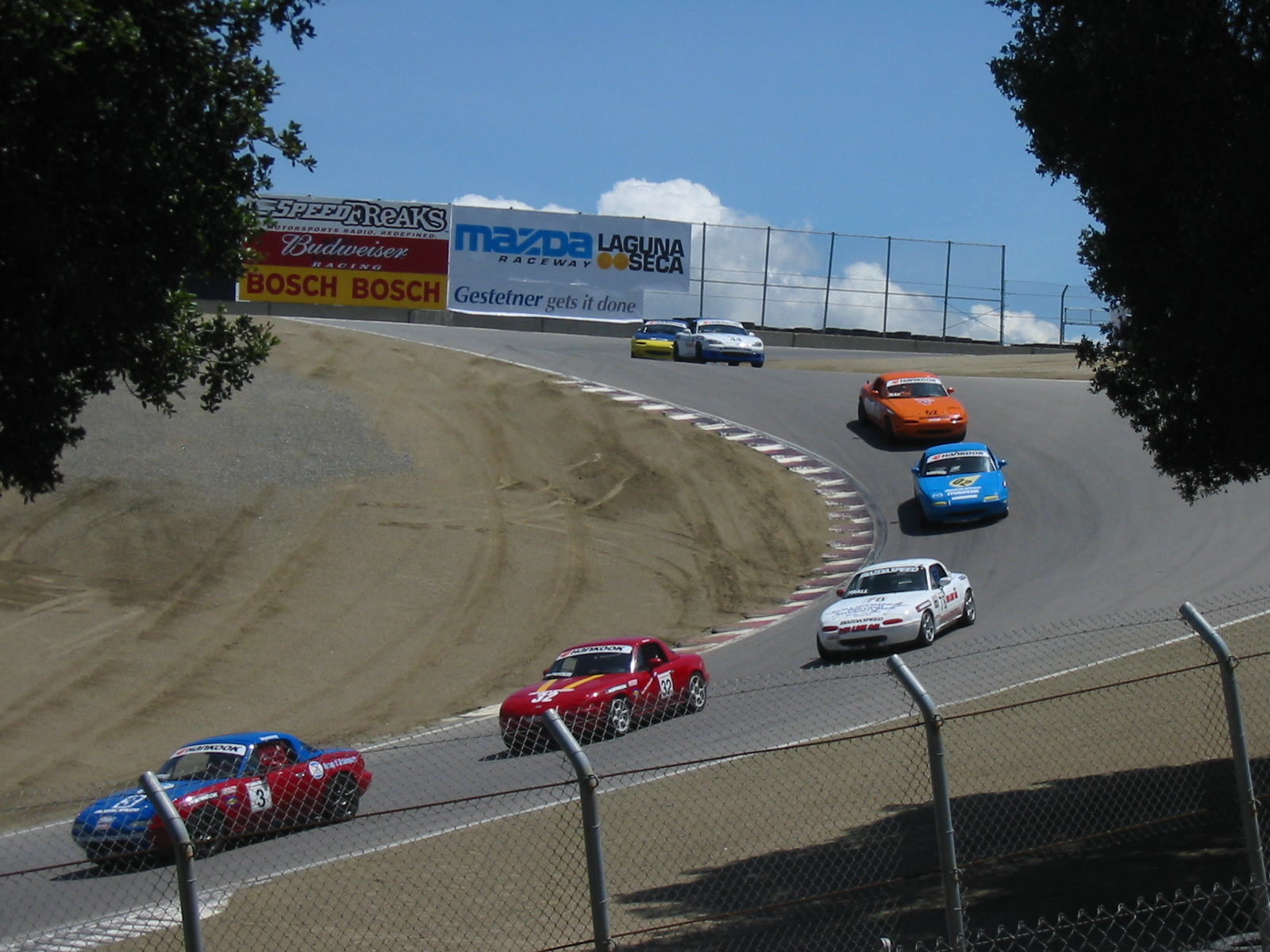
A view of Laguna Seca Raceway's Turn 8, the "Corkscrew," a challenging curve with a downward gradient of up to 16%

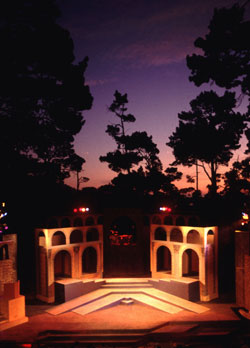
A sunset over the Forest Theater in Carmel-by-the-Sea

=== Performing arts centers and venues ===
- Forest Theater – city-owned outdoor theater, one of the oldest outdoor public theaters in the western United States. Home to two companies, the Pacific Repertory Theatre and the Forest Theater Guild.
- Golden Bough Playhouse – two-theater facility, housing the 300-seat Golden Bough Theatre and the 120-seat Circle Theatre. Home of the Pacific Repertory Theatre.
- Golden State Theatre – 1,200-seat auditorium located in Monterey.
- Monterey County Fairgrounds – outdoor venue with multiple stages. Hosts the Monterey Jazz Festival and the California Roots Music and Arts Festival annually.
- Sunset Center – 700-seat auditorium. Hosts the Carmel Bach Festival annually.

=== Annual events and festivals ===
- California Rodeo Salinas
- California Roots Music and Arts Festival
- Carmel Bach Festival
- Kiddie Kapers Parade
- Monterey Car Week
- Monterey Jazz Festival
- Monterey Motorsports Reunion
- Pebble Beach Concours d'Elegance

=== Sports venues ===
- WeatherTech Raceway Laguna Seca – a paved racing track between Monterey and Salinas used for both auto racing and motorcycle racing

== Outdoors ==
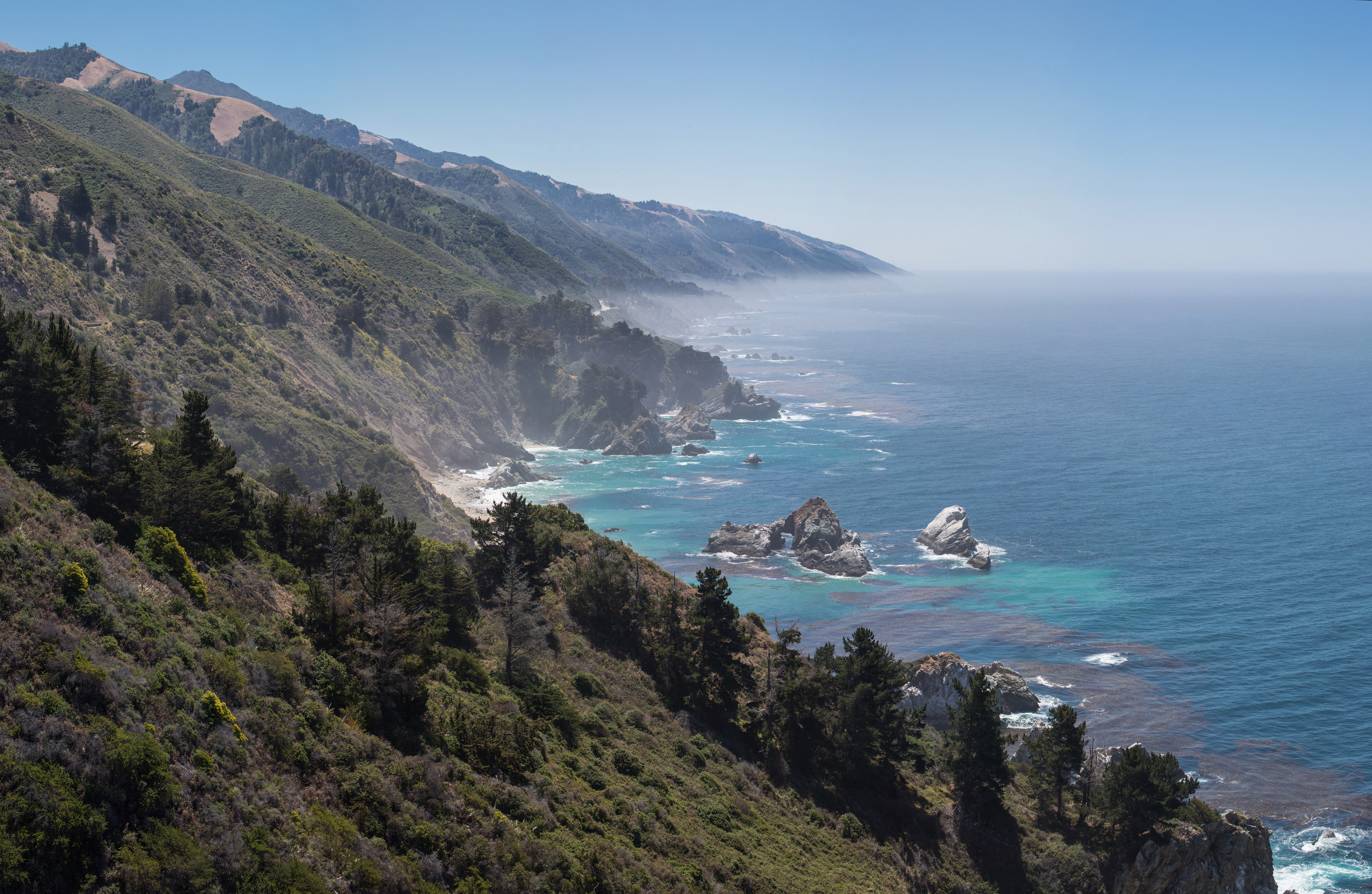
Big Sur coastline along the Pacific Ocean in southern Monterey County

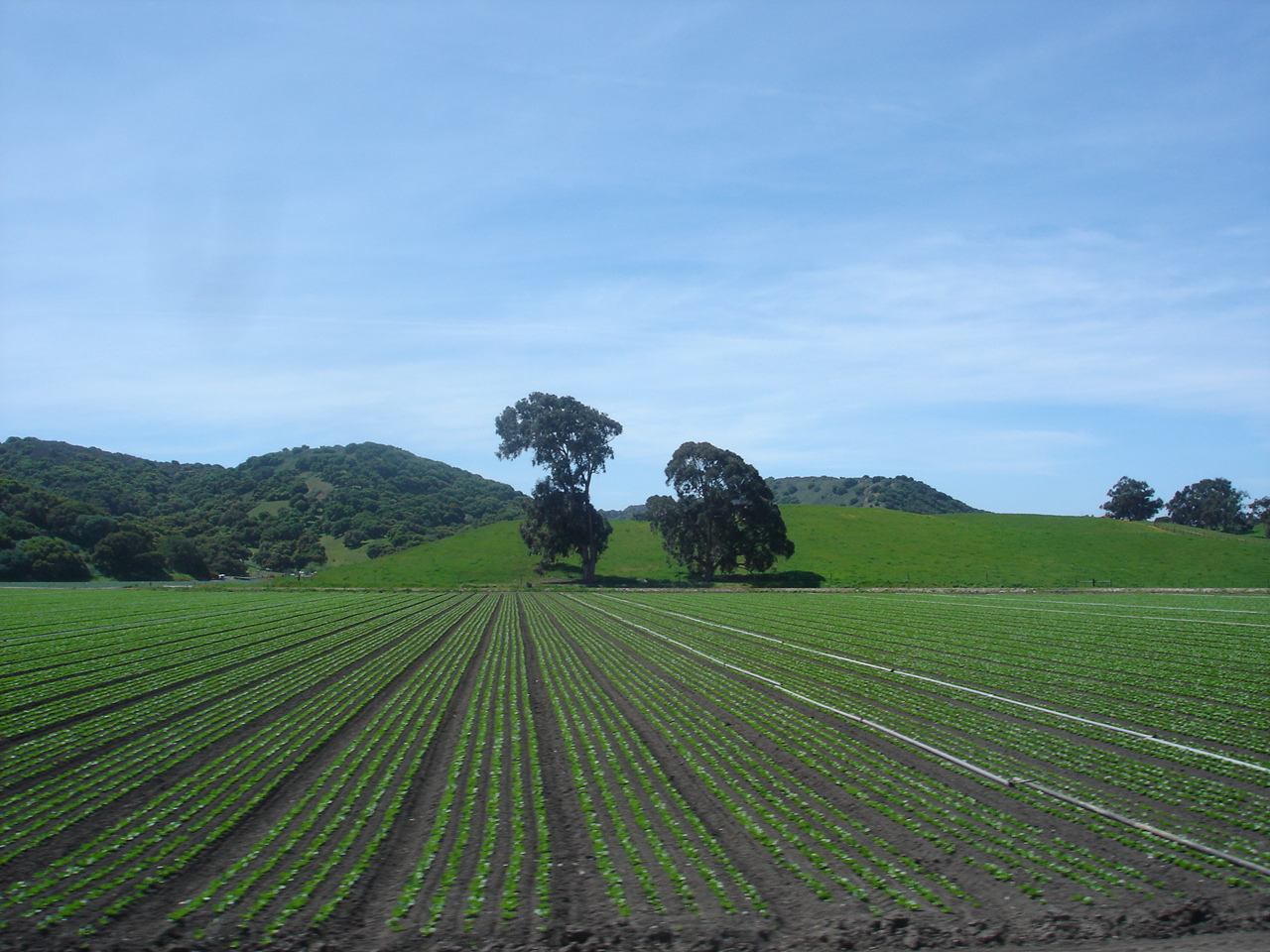
The Salinas Valley, an agricultural region in Monterey County that is home to Salinas, California, the birthplace of John Steinbeck and home of the National Steinbeck Center. Several of Steinbeck's novels were set in locations across Monterey County.

=== Regions ===
- Big Sur
- Monterey Bay
- Monterey Canyon
- Monterey Peninsula
- Salinas Valley

=== Trails ===
- Juan Bautista de Anza National Historic Trail
- Monterey Bay Coastal Recreational Trail
- General Jim Moore Trail

=== Regional parks and lakes ===
- Cachagua Community Park (Carmel Valley)
- Garland Ranch Regional Park (Carmel Valley)
- Jacks Peak Park (Monterey)
- Laguna Grande Regional Park (Monterey, Seaside)
- Lake El Estero (Monterey)
- Locke-Paddon Wetland Community Park (Marina)
- Palo Corona Regional Park (Big Sur)
- San Clemente Blue Rock Open Space (Carmel Valley)

=== Reserves, preserves, and refuges ===
- Asilomar Dunes Natural Preserve at Asilomar State Beach
- Asilomar State Marine Reserve at Asilomar State Beach
- Big Creek State Marine Reserve and Marine Conservation Area offshore from Julia Pfeiffer Burns State Park
- Carmel Bay State Marine Conservation Area
- Carmel Pinnacles State Marine Reserve
- Carmel River Lagoon and Wetlands Natural Preserve at Carmel River State Beach
- Edward F. Ricketts State Marine Conservation Area
- Eolian Dunes Preserve
- Frog Pond Wetland Preserve
- John Little State Reserve
- Lovers Point State Marine Reserve
- Marina Dunes Natural Preserve
- Mill Creek Redwood Preserve
- Monterey Bay National Marine Sanctuary
- Ohlone Coastal Cultural Preserve
- Pacific Grove Marine Gardens State Marine Conservation Area
- Pajaro River Mouth Natural Preserve
- Point Lobos State Marine Reserve
- Point Sur Dunes Natural Preserve
- Salinas River Dunes Natural Preserve
- Salinas River Mouth Natural Preserve
- Salinas River National Wildlife Refuge
- Samuel F. B. Morse Botanical Reserve

=== State parks ===
- Andrew Molera State Park
- Asilomar State Beach
- Carmel River State Beach
- Garrapata State Park
- Hatton Canyon
- Fort Ord Dunes State Park
- Julia Pfeiffer Burns State Park
- Marina State Beach
- Monterey State Beach
- Moss Landing State Beach
- Pacific Grove Marine Gardens State Park
- Pfeiffer Big Sur State Park
- Point Lobos Ranch
- Salinas River State Beach
- Zmudowski State Beach

=== National parks ===
- Pinnacles National Park – designated a National Park in 2013, Pinnacles is in the Salinas Valley and straddles Monterey County and San Benito County.

=== National forests ===
- Los Padres National Forest – national forest spanning from Monterey to Santa Barbara and Ventura

=== Scenic drives ===
- 17 Mile Drive – scenic toll road that takes drivers through the Pebble Beach Resort. The road has well-manicured multi-million dollar homes on one side and dramatic views of the Pacific Ocean on the other, and the resort has restaurants and shops.
- Carmel Valley Scenic Drive – a drive following Carmel Valley Road (also known as County Road G16) from Highway 1 to Highway 101. The drive passes through Carmel Valley, Klondike Canyon, and the foothills of the Santa Lucia Mountains, and offers a wide variety of scenery, and sweeping views of the Salinas Valley.
- Highway 1 – Highway 1 is one the best-known scenic drives in Monterey County and throughout the world. It is both a State Scenic Highway and a National Scenic Byway Road. The highway exhibits a range of geography characteristic of the county, including wetlands, artichoke fields, beach sand dunes, rocky sea cliffs, eucalyptus groves, and coastal redwood forests.
- Point Pinos Lighthouse Drive – scenic drive around the perimeter of Monterey Peninsula
- River Road Wine Trail – scenic drive on Highway 68 stretching from Highway 1 to Highway 101 by the Salinas River that also passes numerous wineries.
