= Monterey Bay National Marine Sanctuary =

Marine protected area in California, U.S.

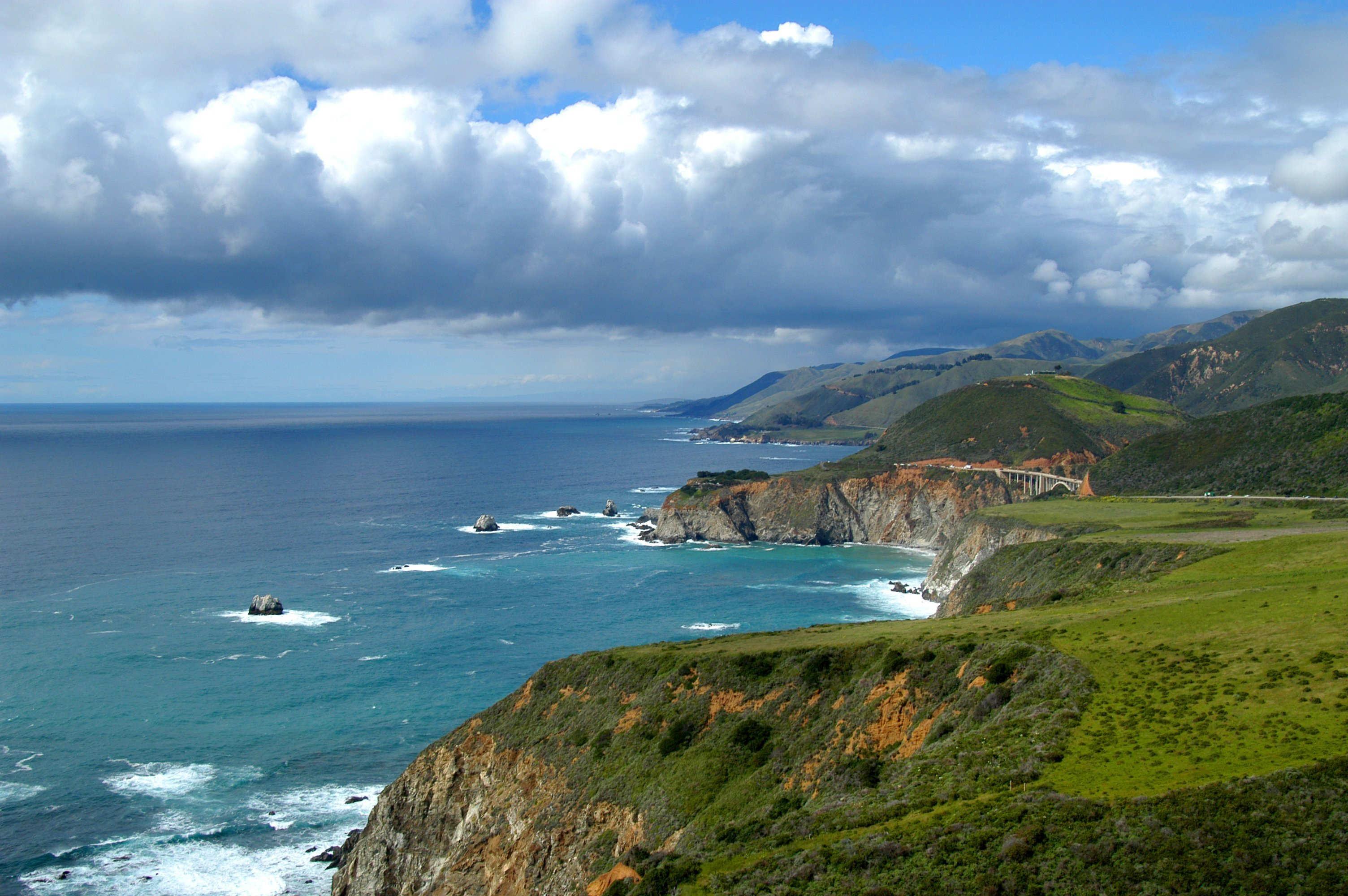
- Big Sur coastline looking north to Bixby Canyon Bridge. Monterey Bay National Marine Sanctuary.
- Map of the sanctuary
- Interactive map of Monterey Bay National Marine Sanctuary
- Location: California's central coast, United States
- Coordinates: 36°48′N 122°30′W
- Area: 6,094 sq mi (15,780 km^{2})
- Established: September 18, 1992; 33 years ago
- Governing body: NOAA National Ocean Service
- Website: montereybay.noaa.gov

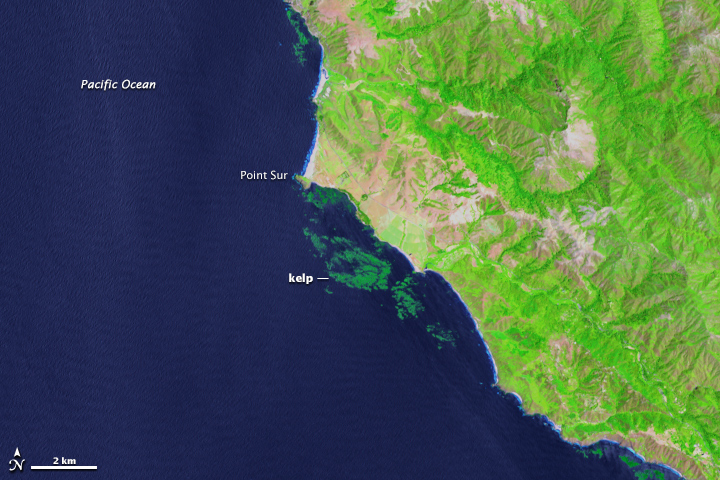
Kelp forests offshore Big Sur, in MBNMS, 2013

Monterey Bay National Marine Sanctuary (MBNMS) is a federally protected marine area offshore of California's Big Sur and central coast in the United States. It is one of the largest US national marine sanctuaries and has a shoreline length of 276 miles (444 km) stretching from just north of the Golden Gate Bridge at San Francisco to Cambria in San Luis Obispo County. Supporting one of the world's most diverse marine ecosystems, it is home to numerous mammals, seabirds, fishes, invertebrates and algae in a remarkably productive coastal environment. MBNMS was designated on September 18, 1992, for the purpose of resource protection, research, education, and compatible public use.

== Description ==
Monterey Bay National Marine Sanctuary is administered by the National Oceanic and Atmospheric Administration (NOAA) Office of National Marine Sanctuaries (ONMS), within the U.S. Department of Commerce. It stretches from Rocky Point in Marin County, just north of the Golden Gate Bridge, to the town of Cambria in San Luis Obispo County, and encompasses a shoreline length of 276 miles (444 km) and 6,094 square miles (4,602 sq nmi; 15,783 km^{2}) of ocean along the Central California coast. Its seaward boundary is an average of 30 miles (26 nmi; 48 km) offshore, and shoreward boundary the mean high tide. Its area is 6,094 square miles (4,602 sq nmi; 15,783 km^{2}). The deepest point is 12,743 feet (3,884 meters) in the Monterey Submarine Canyon, which is deeper than the Grand Canyon. The average ocean surface temperature is 55 °F (13 °C).

The sanctuary provides habitat for at least 36 species of marine mammals, 94 species of seabirds, 525 species of fish, four species of sea turtles, 31 phyla of marine invertebrates, and 450 species of marine algae. Historical sites include 1,276 reported shipwrecks and 718 prehistoric sites. MBNMS has programs for research and monitoring, resource protection, and education and outreach. Public recreation activities such as kayaking, scuba diving, and surfing are permitted, along with commercial fishing. Offshore oil drilling and seabed mining are banned to protect the sanctuary. The sanctuary provides economic value via ecotourism as well as fishery resources, including the Dungeness crab and market squid. Otter trawling has been shown to have a significantly negative impact on the benthic invertebrate biodiversity in areas where trawling is less restricted. Despite its protection as a National Marine Sanctuary, a study found microplastic concentrations were higher than the global average, with a higher amount closer to shore.

=== Visitor centers ===
The Monterey Bay National Marine Sanctuary Coastal Discovery Center is located across California State Route 1 (the Pacific Coast Highway) from the Hearst Castle visitor center in San Simeon, California, at the William Randolph Hearst Memorial State Beach.

The Monterey Bay National Marine Sanctuary Exploration Center opened on July 23, 2012 at 35 Pacific Avenue in Santa Cruz, California. It is located near the Santa Cruz Beach Boardwalk and Santa Cruz Wharf, developed in partnership with the City of Santa Cruz.

=== Collaborations ===
MBNMS collaborations include:

- The Sanctuary Advisory Council's 20 voting members represent a variety of local user groups, as well as the general public, plus seven local and California state governmental jurisdictions. In addition, the respective managers for the five national marine sanctuaries in California (Channel Islands National Marine Sanctuary, Chumash Heritage National Marine Sanctuary, Cordell Bank National Marine Sanctuary, Greater Farallones National Marine Sanctuary, and the Monterey Bay National Marine Sanctuary), the Elkhorn Slough National Estuarine Research Reserve, and the United States Coast Guard sit as non-voting members. The Sanctuary Advisory Council meets in open sessions for the public.
- Working groups of the council include: Research Activities Panel, Conservation Working Group
- Regional partnerships with academic and research institutions, such as Monterey Bay Aquarium Research Institute, CSU Monterey Bay, University of California Santa Cruz, Elkhorn Slough National Estuarine Research Reserve, and Moss Landing Marine Laboratories.
- B-WET (Bay Watershed Education and Training Program): a grant program to provide funding and support for environmental education for students, teachers, and communities throughout the Monterey Bay watershed.

== Events and activities ==
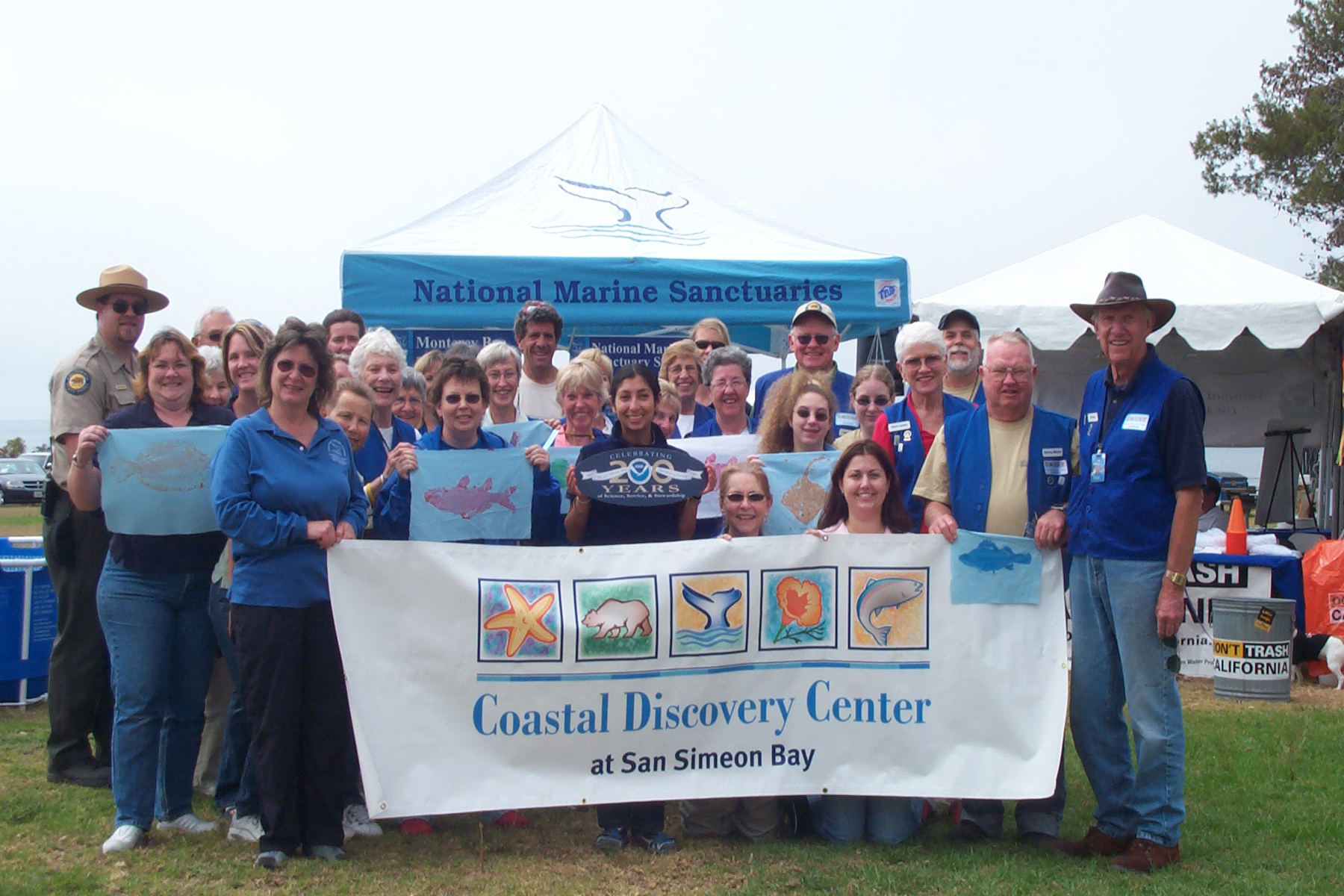
2008 Ocean's Fair at the Coastal Discovery Center at San Simeon, California

A Monterey Bay National Marine Sanctuary event calendar on its website lists advisory council meetings and volunteer opportunities such as Snapshot Day and First Flush (water quality monitoring programs), as well as Bay Net and Team OCEAN (naturalist programs).

The Sanctuary Integrated Monitoring Network (SIMoN) website was launched in 2003 to collect metadata for various monitoring projects in Monterey Bay, Greater Farallones, Cordell Bank, and Channel Islands national marine sanctuaries. In 2012, this information was released as an iOS app called SeaPhoto to allow users access to over 5,000 photos of local marine life.

== History ==
A Marine Sanctuaries Study Bill was first proposed in 1967 with lobbying efforts by the Sierra Club. The Marine Protection, Research, and Sanctuaries Act of 1972 authorized the United States Environmental Protection Agency to monitor off-shore dumping. In 1975, the California Coastal Commission recommended a marine sanctuary and in 1976 Santa Cruz County and Monterey County joined the lobbying effort. In 1983 the Ronald Reagan administration dropped the area from consideration as a sanctuary.

In 1988 the United States Congress re-authorized the Sanctuaries Act and proposed a sanctuary in Monterey Bay. However, public hearings, with the memory of the 1969 Santa Barbara oil spill, brought protests demanding a larger size. The first draft environmental impact statement was released in 1990, and a final management plan in June 1992 proposing the extended area. NOAA states both that it designated the sanctuary on September 18, 1992, and also that on September 20, 1992, legislation proposed by U.S. Representative Leon Panetta authorized the sanctuary. At the time, it was the largest federal marine sanctuary in the continental United States.

As part of the 2008 management plan for MBNMS, a boundary change included the Davidson Seamount Management Zone (DSMZ), which surrounds Davidson Seamount, a pristine undersea mountain habitat located 80 miles to the southwest of Monterey and 75 miles west of San Simeon. The boundary change added a 775 square mile area to MBNMS, increasing the sanctuary to 6,094 square miles.

=== Management ===
There have been six superintendents of MBNMS since its designation:

1. Terry Jackson (1992 to 1997): Jackson was an officer with NOAA Commissioned Officer Corps who was assigned to the MBNMS as its first manager in 1992. Over the next year, Jackson hired additional MBNMS staffers. As a NOAA Corps officer, Jackson's land-based assignment ended in 1997. Jackson retired from the NOAA Corps in 1998.
2. Carol Fairfield (June and July 1997): A call for superintendent applicants went out in the spring of 1997. However, that process was ended by the chief of NOAA's Office of National Marine Sanctuaries, Stephanie Thornton, because she "did not believe any of the current applicants had the skills she was looking for to be the MBNMS Superintendent." The call for applicants was re-advertised, and Carol Fairfield (with NOAA's National Marine Fisheries Service Protected Resources Program) was selected in June 1997, but was reassigned in July 1997.
3. Joanne Flanders (1997): At the time of Jackson's departure, Joanne Flanders (another NOAA Corps Officer) was Assistant Superintendent. Flanders was appointed acting superintendent for about six months.
4. William J. Douros (1998 to 2006): In January 1998, William J. Douros, who had previously worked for Santa Barbara County, became superintendent. In 2006, Douros was promoted to regional director for the Office of National Marine Sanctuaries - West Coast Region.
5. Paul Michel (2007 to 2020): Paul Michel, who had worked at the Environmental Protection Agency since 1987, became superintendent.
6. Lisa Wooninck (2021 to present): Lisa Wooninck started her federal career with National Marine Fisheries Service as a fishery biologist before joining Office of National Marine Sanctuaries - West Coast Region as a resource protection specialist and policy coordinator. She became MBNMS superintendent in November 2021.

=== Management of northern section ===
MBNMS was established in 1992 with only one staff member being assigned shortly thereafter. Since Greater Farallones National Marine Sanctuary (GFNMS) was designated in 1981 and had established staff, GFNMS had taken on administrative jurisdiction over the northern portion of Monterey Bay National Marine Sanctuary from the San Mateo/Santa Cruz County line (Año Nuevo Point) northward to the existing boundary (Rocky Point) between the two national marine sanctuaries.

== Oil and gas reserves ==
There are offshore oil and gas reserves in the United States, but exploration has not been permitted in MBNMS since inception. In 1982, United States Secretary of the Interior James G. Watt proposed opening the outer continental shelf off the Central Coast of California to oil and gas exploration. California residents and politicians strongly opposed the proposal and it was defeated. In 1990, President George H. W. Bush used an obscure 1953 law to permanently ban oil and gas development in Monterey Bay. In late December 2016, President Barack Obama used the same law to ban oil exploration from Hearst Castle to Point Arena in Mendocino County, California.

In July 2017, under the direction of Executive Order 13795 from President Donald Trump, the United States Department of Commerce began re-evaluating the protected status of the sanctuary, which includes the Davidson Seamount off the coast of Big Sur. The seamount, at 23 nmi (43 km; 26 mi) long, 7 nmi (13 km; 8.1 mi) wide, and 7,480 feet (2,280 m) high, is one of the largest in the world. Many environmentalists opposed opening the area to oil and gas exploration.

== Related protection areas ==
A large number of protected areas have overlapping jurisdictions. From roughly from north to south:

- Greater Farallones National Marine Sanctuary (adjacent to the north)
- Golden Gate National Recreation Area
- San Francisco Bay National Estuarine Research Reserve
- Fitzgerald Marine Reserve
- Half Moon Bay State Beach
- San Gregorio State Beach
- Pomponio State Beach
- Pescadero State Beach
- Bean Hollow State Beach
- Pigeon Point Light Station State Historic Park
- Año Nuevo State Marine Conservation Area
- Año Nuevo State Reserve
- Theodore J. Hoover Natural Preserve
- Greyhound Rock State Marine Conservation Area
- Natural Bridges State Beach
- Lighthouse Field State Beach
- Twin Lakes State Beach
- New Brighton State Beach
- Seacliff State Beach
- Manresa State Beach
- Sunset State Beach
- Santa Cruz harbor
- Zmudowski State Beach
- Moss Landing State Beach
- Moss Landing Wildlife Area
- Elkhorn Slough National Estuarine Research Reserve
- Salinas River State Beach
- Salinas River National Wildlife Refuge
- Marina State Beach
- Monterey State Beach
- Edward F. Ricketts State Marine Conservation Area
- Lovers Point State Marine Reserve
- Asilomar State Marine Reserve
- Asilomar State Beach
- Carmel Pinnacles State Marine Reserve
- Carmel Bay State Marine Conservation Area
- Point Lobos State Marine Reserve and State Marine Conservation Area
- Pfeiffer Big Sur State Park
- Los Padres National Forest
- Julia Pfeiffer Burns State Park
- Big Creek State Marine Reserve and Big Creek State Marine Conservation Area
- Cambria State Marine Conservation Area
- William Randolph Hearst Memorial State Beach
- San Simeon State Park
- White Rock (Cambria) State Marine Conservation Area
- Chumash Heritage National Marine Sanctuary (adjacent to the south)

== Gallery ==
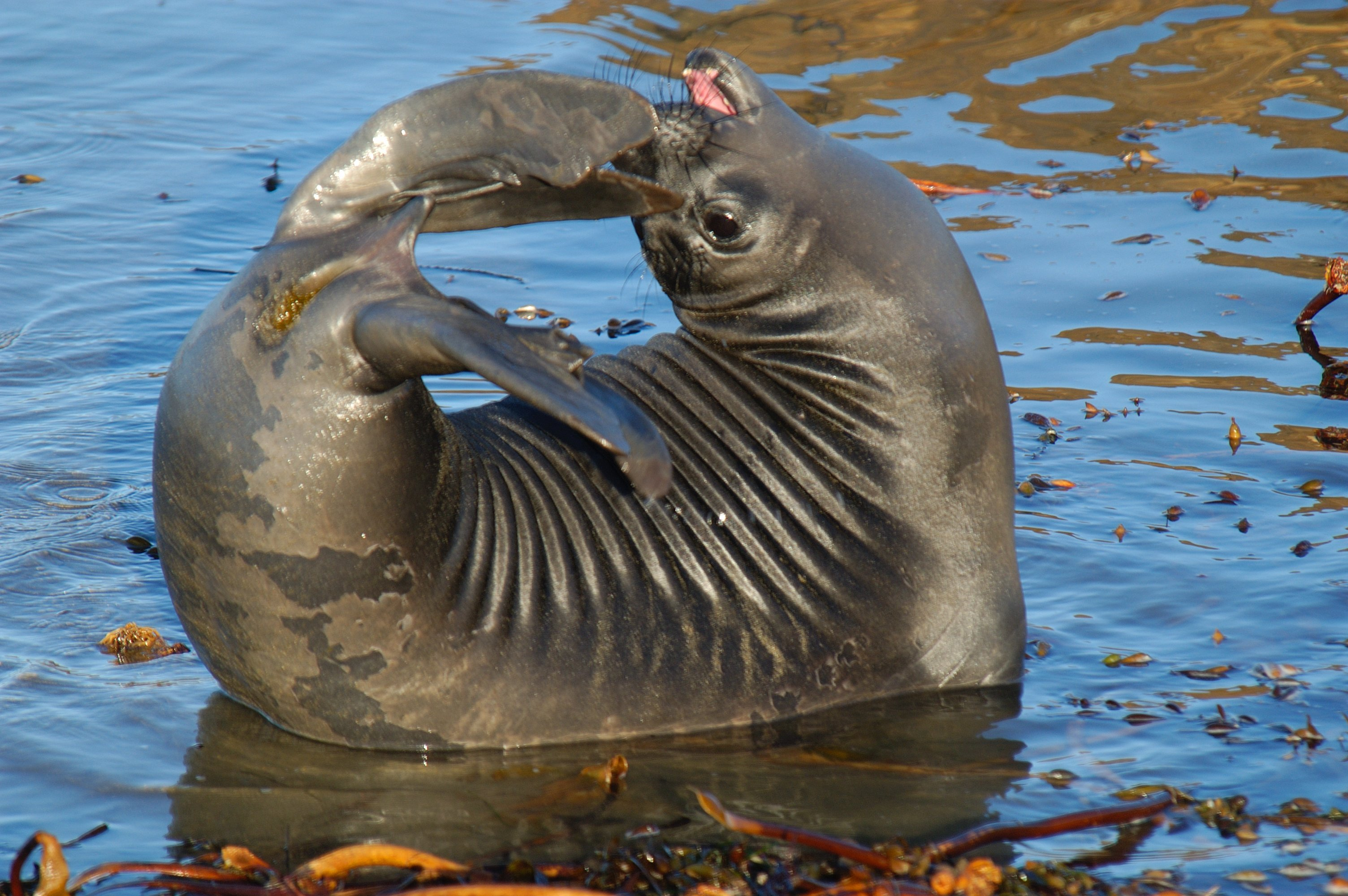
Young elephant seal at rookery, MBNMS

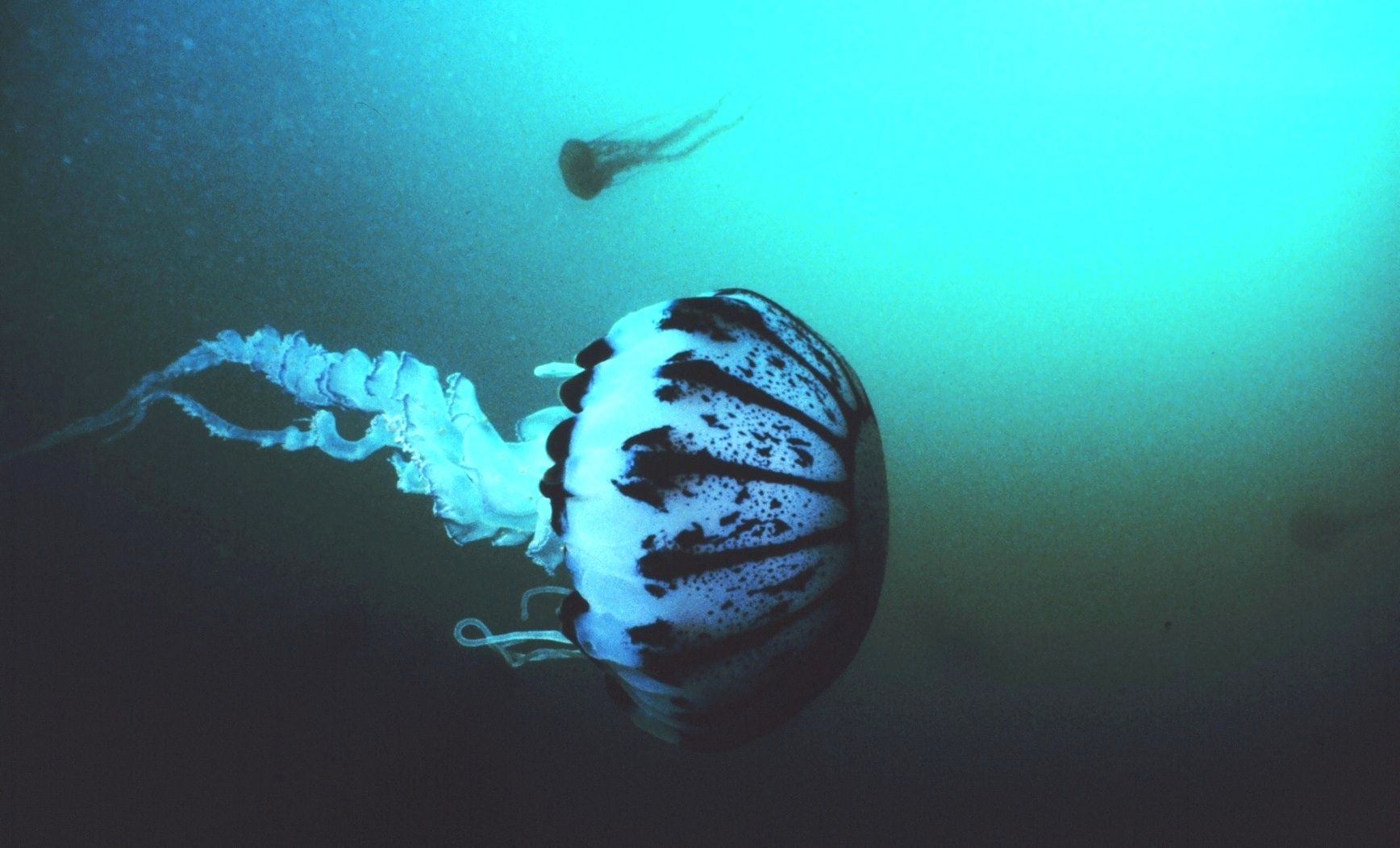
A purple striped jellyfish in the sanctuary

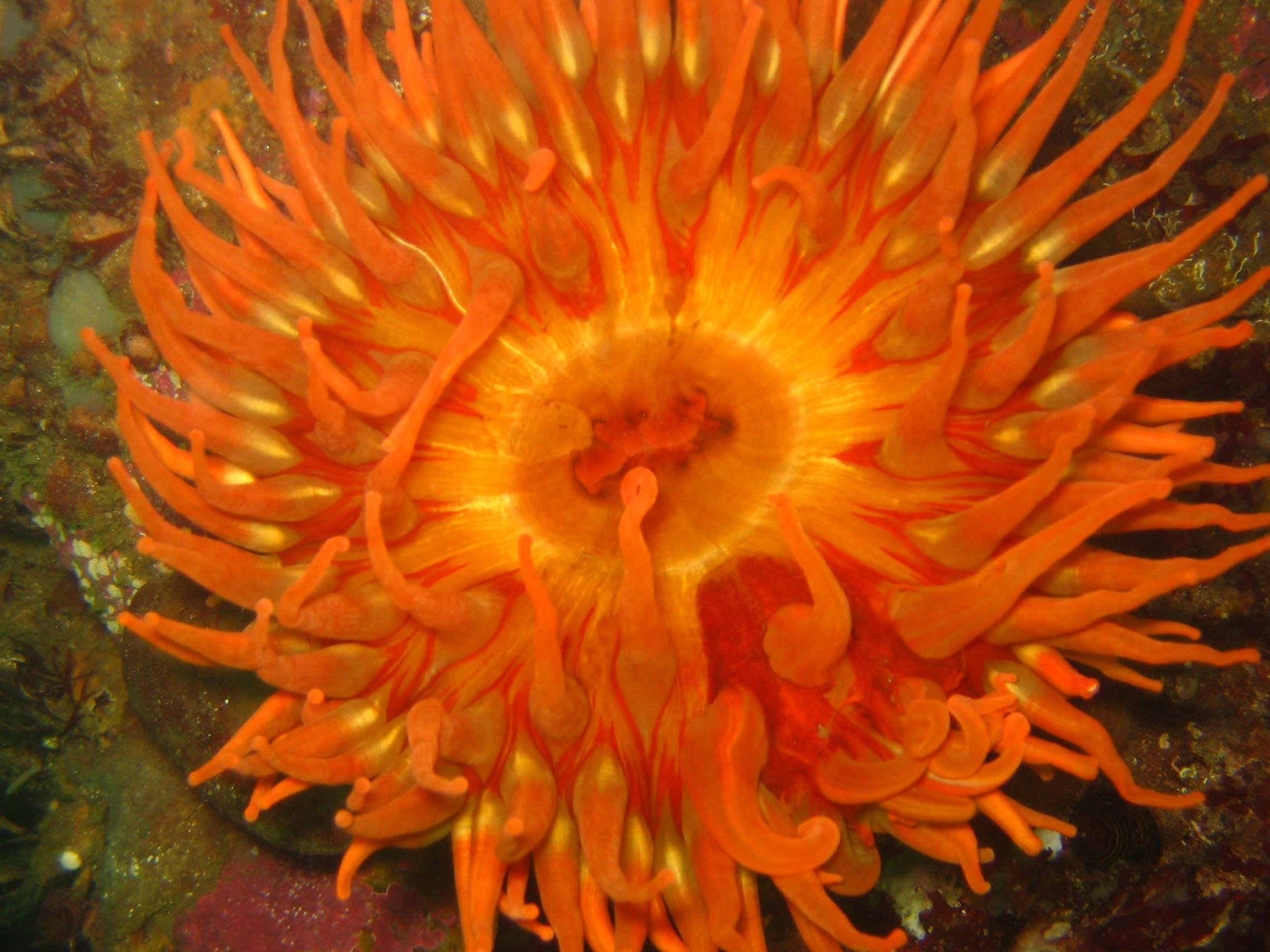
Anemone, MBNMS

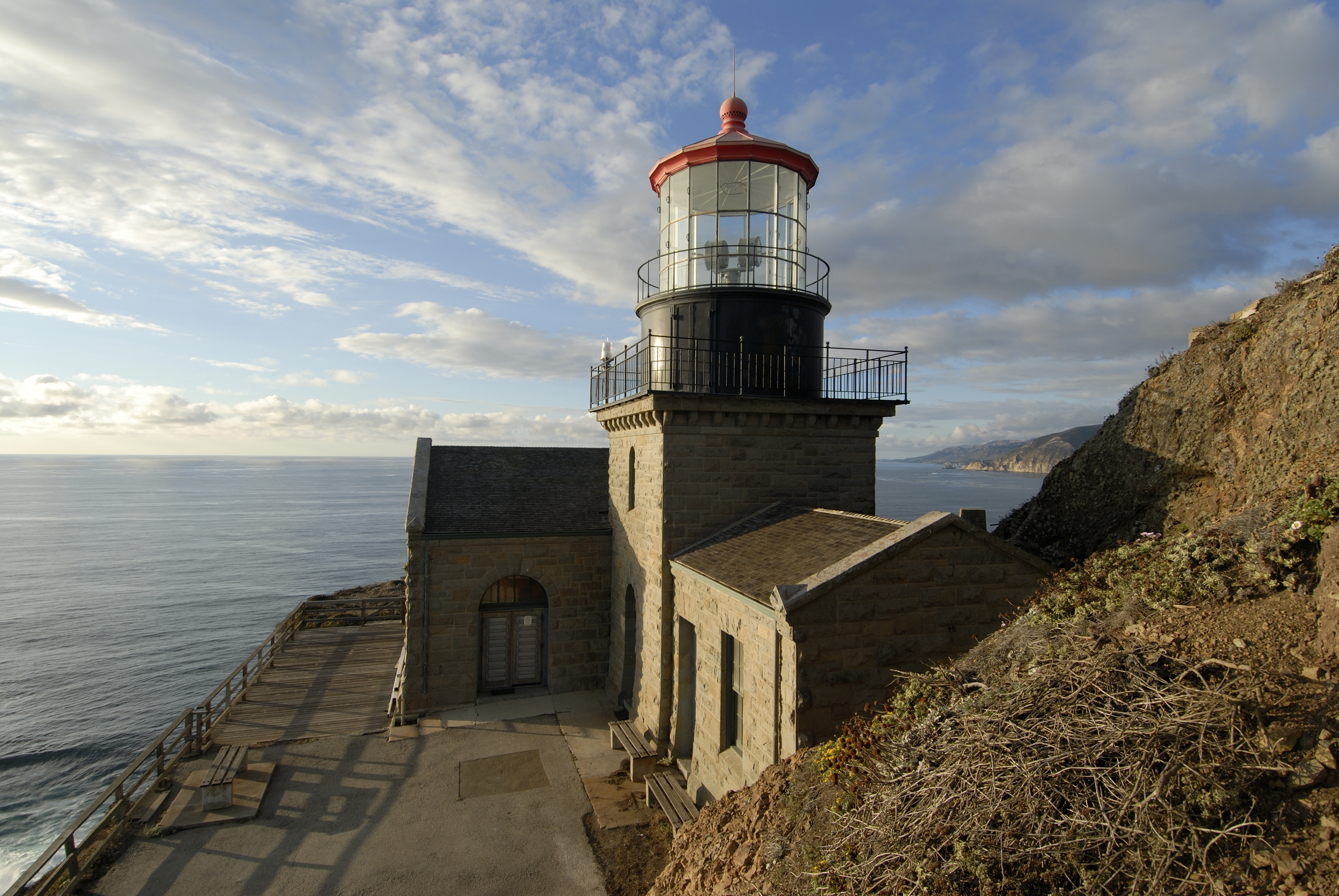
Point Sur Lighthouse

== See also ==
- List of marine protected areas of California
