= Pacific Grove Marine Gardens State Marine Conservation Area =

Marine protected area in California

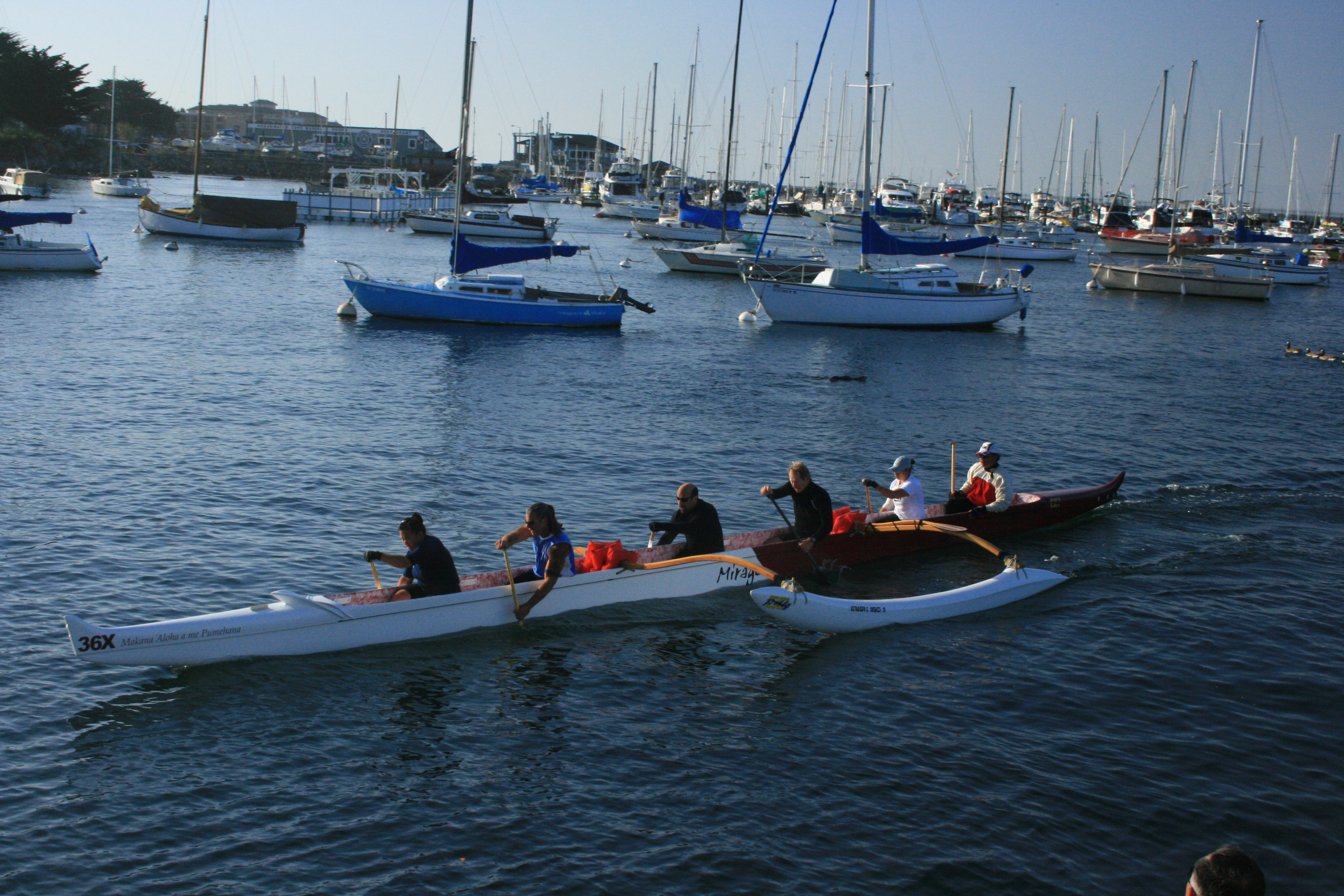
Rowers in Monterey Bay

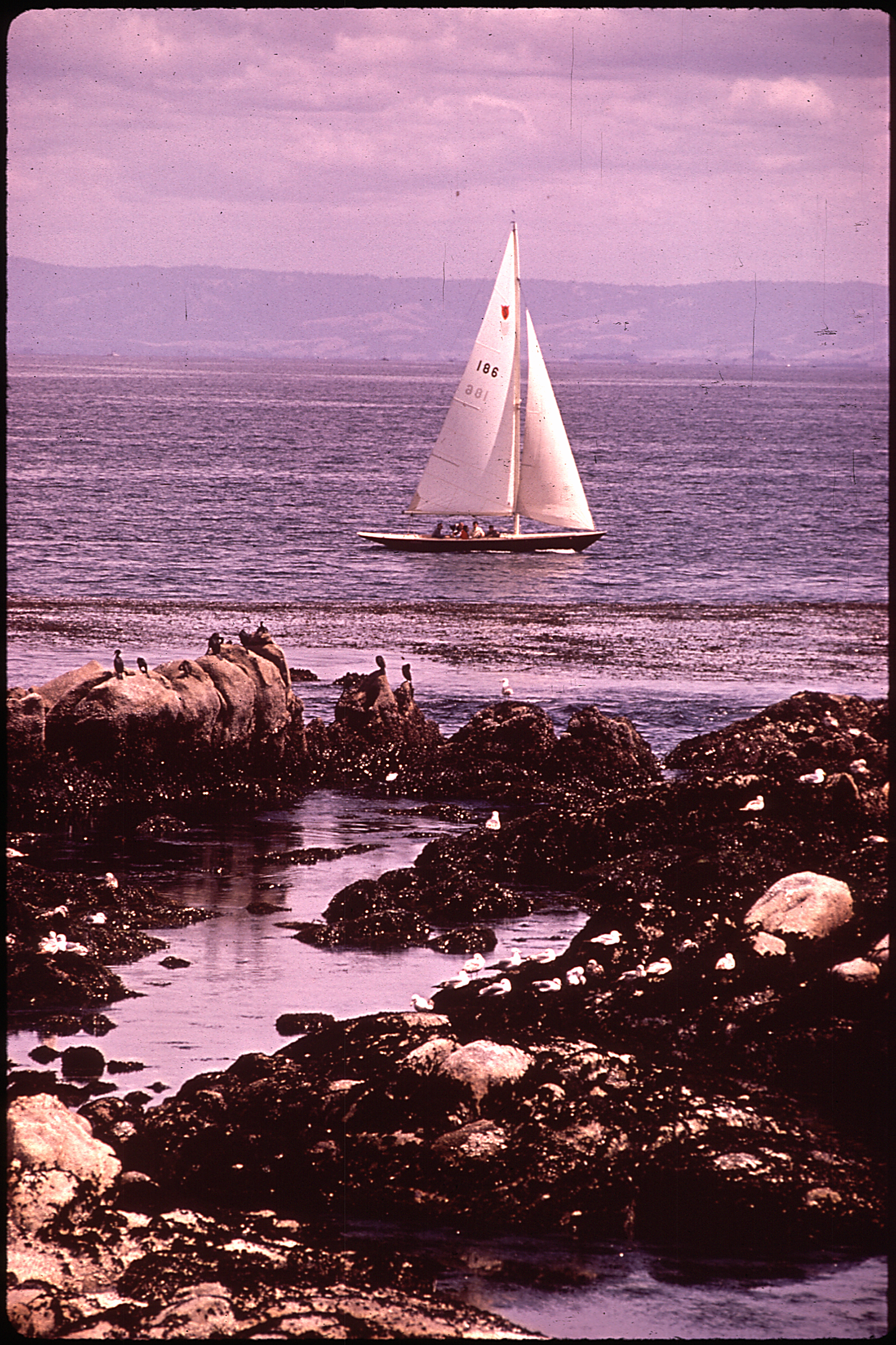
Monterey Bay

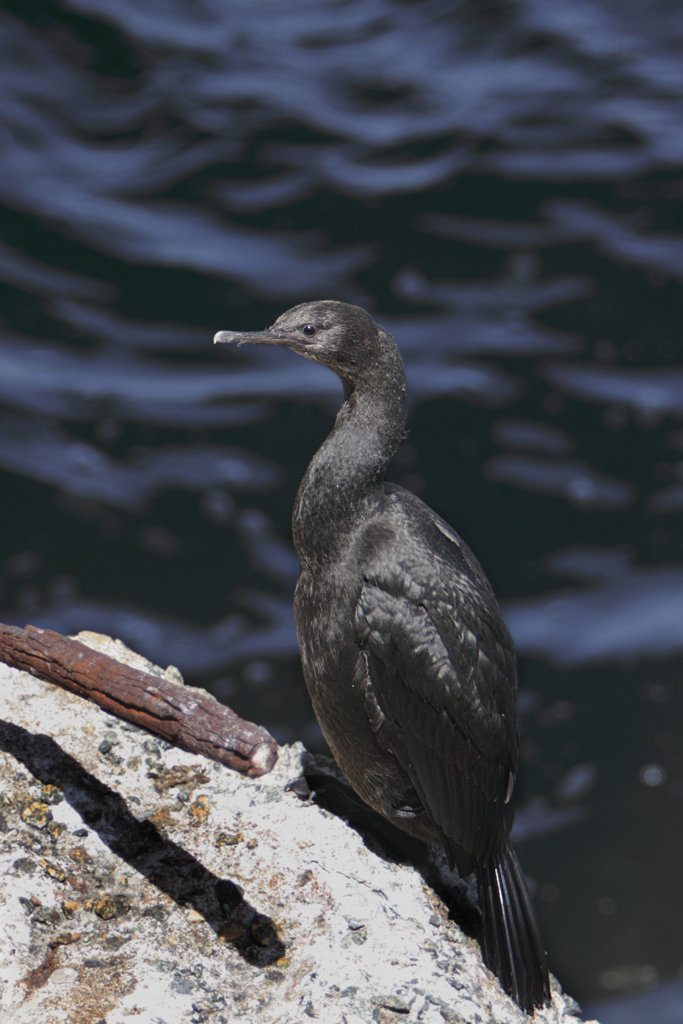
Cormorant chick in Monterey Bay

Pacific Grove Marine Gardens State Marine Conservation Area is one of four small marine protected areas located near the cities of Monterey and Pacific Grove, at the southern end of Monterey Bay on California’s central coast. The four MPAs together encompass 2.96 square miles (7.7 km^{2}). Within the SMCA fishing and take of all living marine resources is prohibited except the recreational take of finfish and the commercial take of giant and bull kelp by hand under certain conditions. According to the Frommer's guide, the Marine Gardens area is "renowned for ocean views, flowers, and tide-pool seaweed beds."

== History ==
Pacific Grove Marine Gardens State Marine Conservation Area was established in September 2007 by the California Department of Fish & Game. It was one of 29 marine protected areas adopted during the first phase of the Marine Life Protection Act Initiative. The Marine Life Protection Act Initiative (or MLPAI) is a collaborative public process to create a statewide network of marine protected areas along the California coastline.

== Geography and natural features ==
Pacific Grove Marine Gardens SMCA is located off the coast of the Monterey Peninsula, at the southern end of Monterey Bay. It covers an area of .93 sq miles (2.4 km^{2}). The reserve is directly offshore from Point Pinos Lighthouse Reservation.

Pacific Grove Marine Gardens SMCA is one of four marine protected areas bordering the Monterey Peninsula. It is between Asilomar State Marine Reserve and Lovers Point State Marine Reserve. Farther east is the Edward F. Ricketts State Marine Conservation Area. All four areas are included within the Monterey Bay National Marine Sanctuary.

This marine protected area is bounded by the mean high tide line, and straight lines connecting the following points in the order listed:

36° 37.60’ N. lat. 121° 54.91’ W. long.;

36° 37.60’ N. lat. 121° 54.75’ W. long.;

36° 38.70’ N. lat. 121° 55.40’ W. long.;

36° 38.90’ N. lat. 121° 56.60’ W. long.; and

36° 38.22’ N. lat. 121° 56.15’ W. long.

== Habitat and wildlife ==
The Monterey Peninsula includes extensive tidepools brimming with life. Its sandy beaches are used by pupping harbor seals, and dense kelp beds offshore provide shelter for sea otters. The Pacific Grove Marine Gardens SMCA provides habitat for a variety of marine life, and includes kelp forest, beach, rocky intertidal, soft and hard bottom.

== Recreation and tourism ==
The natural environment and ocean resources of the Monterey Peninsula draw millions of visitors from around the world each year, including more than 65,000 scuba divers drawn by the area’s easy access, variety of wildlife, and kelp forests.

The Monterey Bay Aquarium is a tourist attraction featuring a 28-foot (8.5 m) living kelp forest. The exhibit includes many of the species native to the nearby marine protected areas. The aquarium also houses sea otters, intertidal wildlife, and occasionally sea turtles.

In addition to diving and visiting the aquarium, people visit Monterey Bay for kayaking, whale watching, charter fishing, surfing, bird watching, tidepooling and walking on the beach. The adjacent Point Pinos Lighthouse Reservation is home to the oldest continuously operating lighthouse on the West Coast.

California’s marine protected areas encourage recreational and educational uses of the ocean. Activities such as kayaking, diving, snorkeling, and swimming are allowed unless otherwise restricted.

== Scientific monitoring ==
As specified by the Marine Life Protection Act, select marine protected areas along California’s central coast are being monitored by scientists to track their effectiveness and learn more about ocean health. Similar studies in marine protected areas located off of the Santa Barbara Channel Islands have already detected gradual improvements in fish size and number.

Local scientific and educational institutions involved in the monitoring include Stanford University’s Hopkins Marine Station, University of California Santa Cruz, Moss Landing Marine Laboratories and Cal Poly San Luis Obispo. Research methods include hook-and-line sampling, intertidal and scuba diver surveys, and the use of Remote Operated Vehicle (ROV) submarines.
