= Asilomar State Marine Reserve =

Marine protected area in California, U.S.

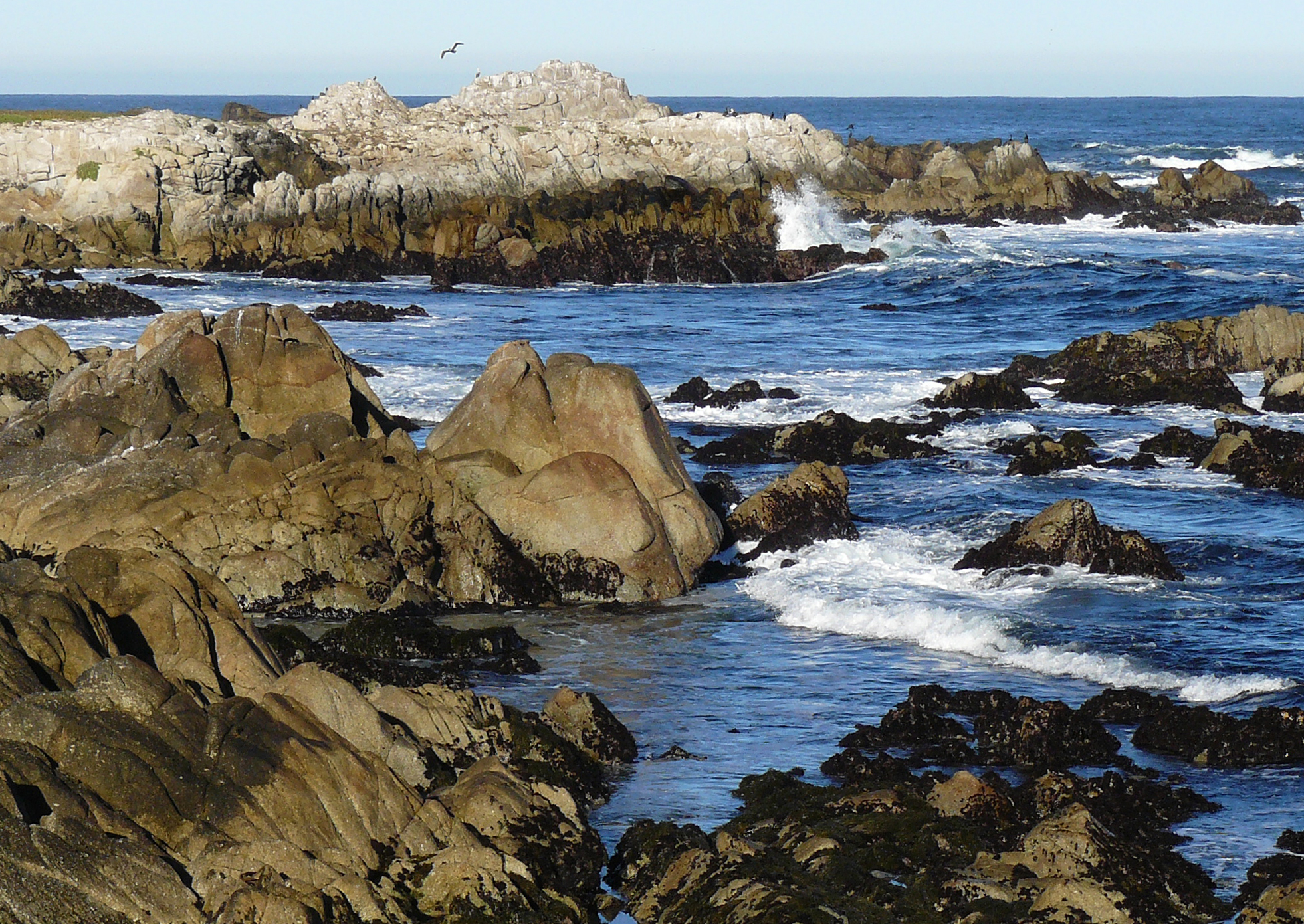
Rocks at Asilomar State Beach

Asilomar State Marine Reserve (SMR) is one of four small marine protected areas (MPAs) located near the cities of Monterey and Pacific Grove, at the southern end of Monterey Bay on California's central coast. The four MPAs together encompass 2.96 square miles (7.7 km^{2}). The SMR protects all marine life within its boundaries. Fishing and take of all living marine resources is prohibited.

== History ==
The Asilomar State Marine Reserve was established in September 2007 by the California Department of Fish and Game. It was one of 29 marine protected areas adopted during the first phase of the Marine Life Protection Act Initiative, which created a statewide network of marine protected areas along the California coastline. The reserve helps protect some of the central coast's most heavily used and accessible areas near the shore while leaving most of the coastal waters open for continued fishing.

== Geography and natural features ==
Asilomar SMR is located off the coast of the Monterey Peninsula, at the southern end of Monterey Bay. It covers an area of 1.51 square miles (3.9 km^{2}). The reserve is directly offshore from Asilomar State Beach.

Asilomar SMR is the westernmost of four marine protected areas bordering the Monterey Peninsula. It is adjacent to the Pacific Grove Marine Gardens State Marine Conservation Area. Further east are the Lovers Point State Marine Reserve and the Edward F. Ricketts State Marine Conservation Area. All four areas are included within the Monterey Bay National Marine Sanctuary.

This marine protected area is bounded by the mean high tide line and straight lines connecting the following points in the order listed: 36°38.22′N 121°56.15′W, 36°38.90′N 121°56.60′W and 36°36.60′N 121°57.50′W.

== Habitat and wildlife ==
The Monterey Peninsula includes extensive tidepools brimming with life. Its sandy beaches are used by pupping harbor seals, and dense kelp beds offshore provide shelter for sea otters. The Asilomar SMR provides habitat for a variety of marine life, and includes kelp forest, beach, rocky intertidal, and soft and hard bottom.

== Recreation and nearby attractions ==
The natural environment and ocean resources of the Monterey Peninsula draw millions of visitors from around the world each year, including more than 60,000 scuba divers drawn by the area's ease of access, variety of wildlife, and kelp forests

The Monterey Bay Aquarium is a tourist attraction featuring a 28-foot (8.5 m) living kelp forest. The exhibit includes species native to the nearby marine protected areas. The aquarium also houses sea otters, intertidal wildlife, and occasionally sea turtles.

In addition to diving and visiting the aquarium, visitors to the Monterey Bay engage in kayaking, whale watching, charter fishing, surfing, bird watching, tidepooling and walking on the beach. Asilomar State Beach, adjacent to the reserve, has a .75 mile (1.2 km) walking trail.

California's marine protected areas encourage recreational and educational uses of the ocean. Activities such as kayaking, diving, snorkeling, and swimming are allowed unless otherwise restricted.

== Scientific monitoring ==
As specified by the Marine Life Protection Act, select marine protected areas along California's central coast are being monitored by scientists to track their effectiveness and learn more about ocean health. Similar studies in marine protected areas located off of the Santa Barbara Channel Islands have already detected gradual improvements in fish size and number.

Local scientific and educational institutions involved in the monitoring include the Hopkins Marine Station (located at the Lovers Point SMR), the Monterey Bay Aquarium Research Institute (MBARI), and Moss Landing Marine Laboratories. Research methods include hook-and-line sampling, scuba diver surveys, and the use of remote operated vehicle (ROV) submarines.
