= Carmel River State Beach =

State park in California

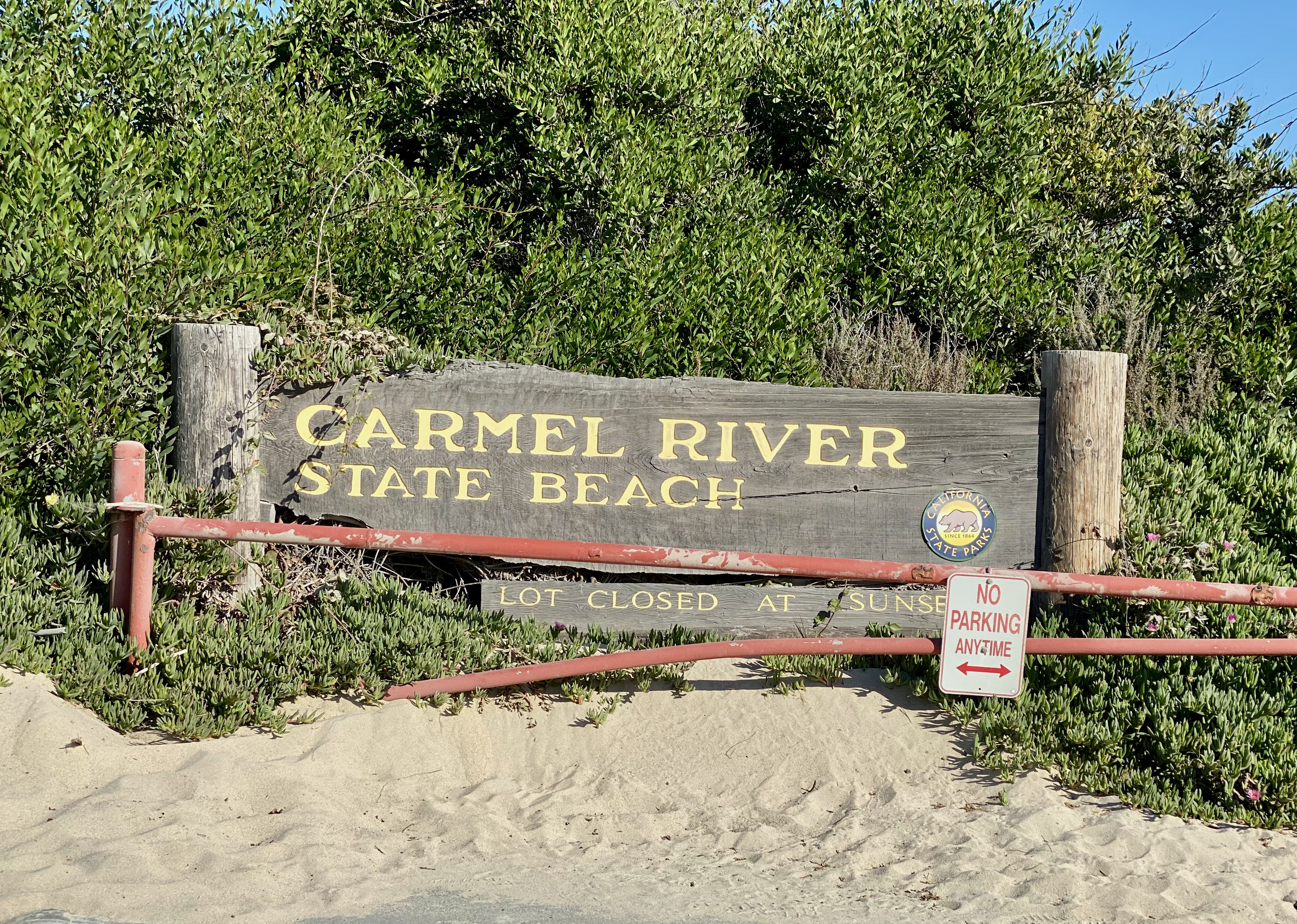
- Entrance to the Carmel River State Beach

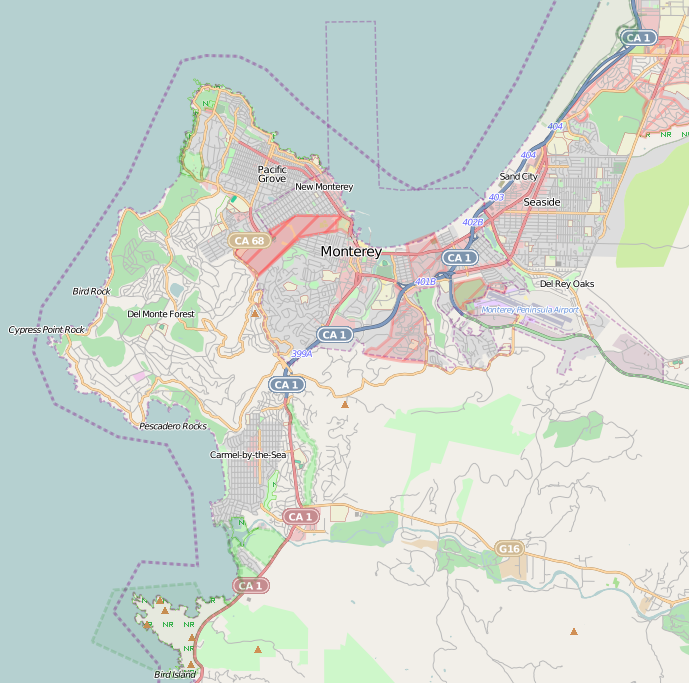
- Location within Monterey Peninsula
- Location: 26478 Carmelo Street, Monterey County, California, United States
- Nearest city: Carmel, California
- Coordinates: 36°31′56″N 121°55′37″W
- Area: 297 acres (120 ha)
- Established: 1953
- Governing body: California Department of Parks and Recreation

Carmel River State Beach is a state park unit at the mouth of Carmel Valley, California, United States, featuring a 1-mile-long (1.6 km) protected beach with a lagoon formed by the Carmel River. The lagoon attracts many migratory birds. The state beach includes Mara Beach and Monastery Beach, (also called San Jose Creek Beach) which is popular with scuba divers. Sea kayakers also frequent the beach, which has easy access to the natural reserves of Point Lobos. The 297-acre (120 ha) park was established in 1953.

== History ==
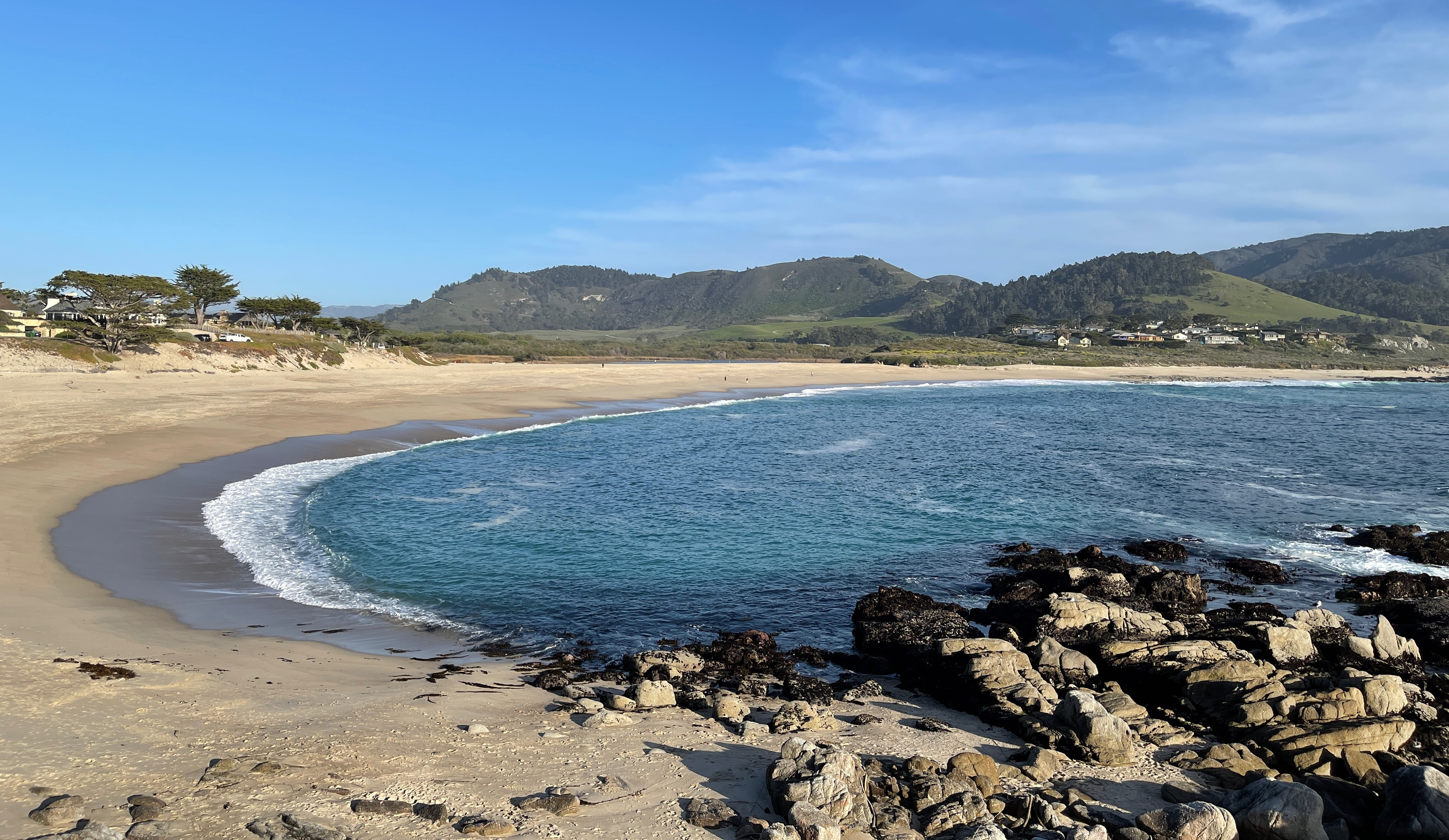
Carmel River State Beach view from Scenic Road.

In 1602 Spanish explorer Sebastián Vizcaíno landed at this beach. Gaspar de Portolà, during the Portola expedition, was encamped on this beach and rested here before deciding to return to San Diego because of low supplies and having failed to rendezvous with the Spanish supply ships. A cross commemorating the landing is on the beach.

== Recreational activities ==
Carmel River State Beach is a popular spot for divers and kayakers, who can access the notable kelp forests in the area. It is also popular with birders, and is a stop on the Central Coast Birding Trail. The best seasons for birdwatching at Carmel River State Beach are fall and winter.

Swimming on this section of the coast can be extremely dangerous because of the strong currents. Carmel River State Beach is considered especially dangerous for swimming as the steep drop-off from shore can minimize turbulent waves giving the mistaken impression of a calm sea.

Dogs are allowed in the park, but must be kept on a leash.

== Ecology ==
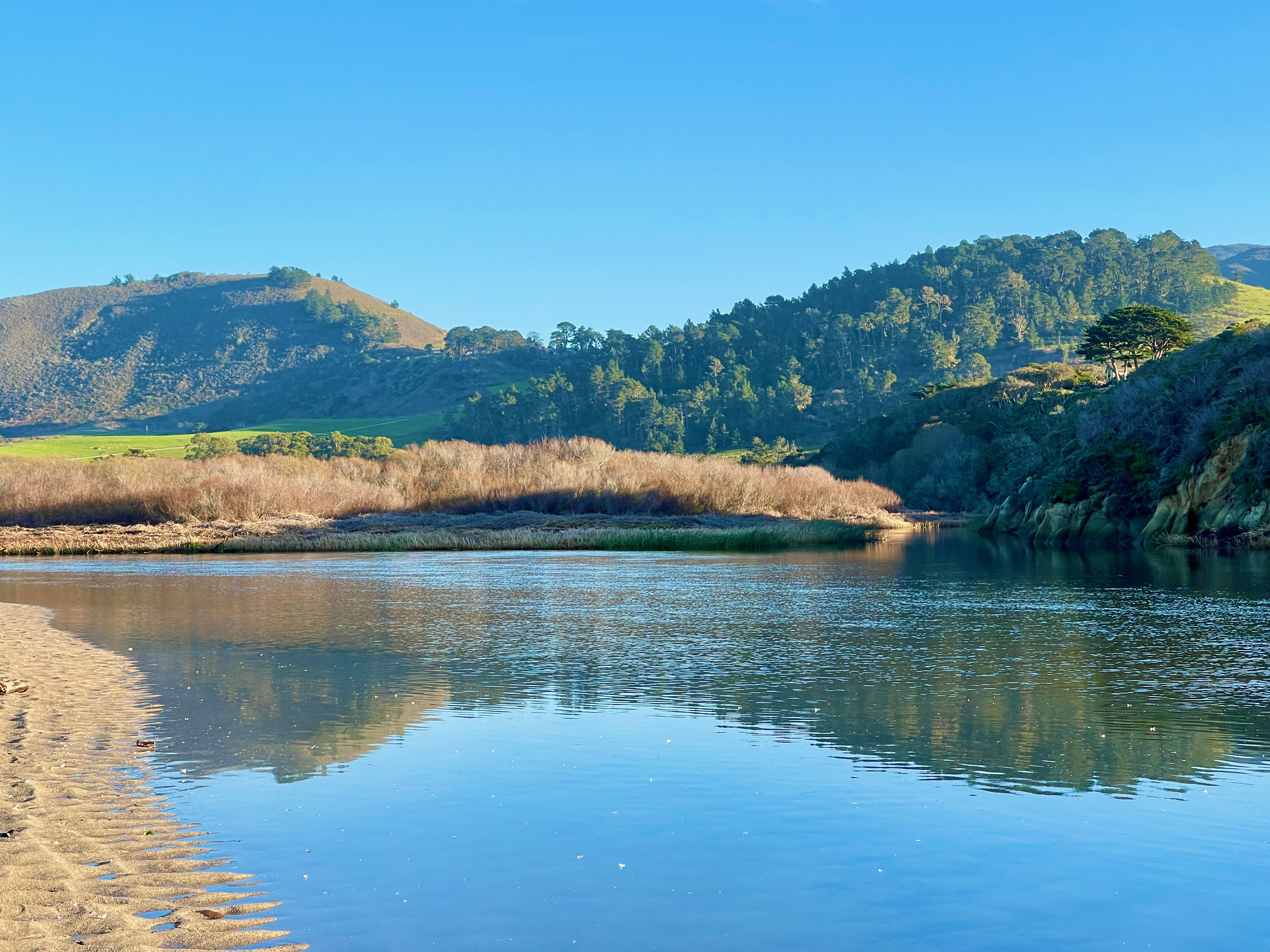
Carmel River State Beach with hills in the background.

South of the Carmel River Lagoon and Wetlands Natural Preserve, great blue heron, greater yellowlegs, brown pelicans, Virginia rail, and many species of gulls, terns, and egrets can be spotted. A variety of dune flora and fauna can also be found here, as well as organisms inhabiting the rocky intertidal and sandy intertidal zones.

== Location ==
The park enterence is located off Carmel Point, at Scenic Road and Carmelo Street. It is adjacent to California State Route 1, about 1 mi (1.6 km) south of Rio Road at the mouth of Carmel Valley, north of the Big Sur coast in Monterey County, California.

The beach is open to walk-in visitors, and has public restrooms next to the parking lot.

== See also ==
- List of beaches in California
- List of California state parks
- List of California State Beaches
