= Lovers Point State Marine Reserve =

Marine protected area

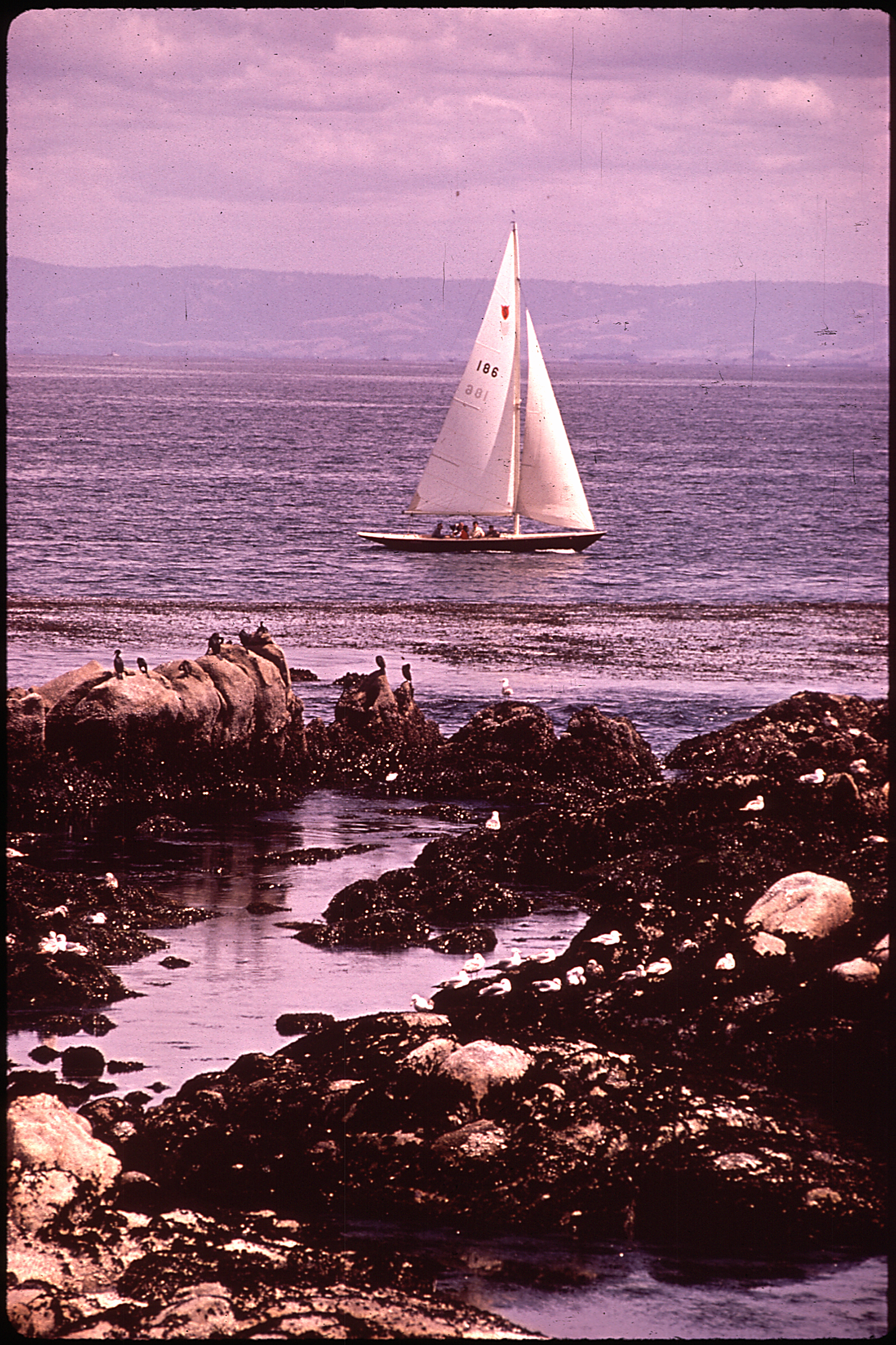
Monterey Bay

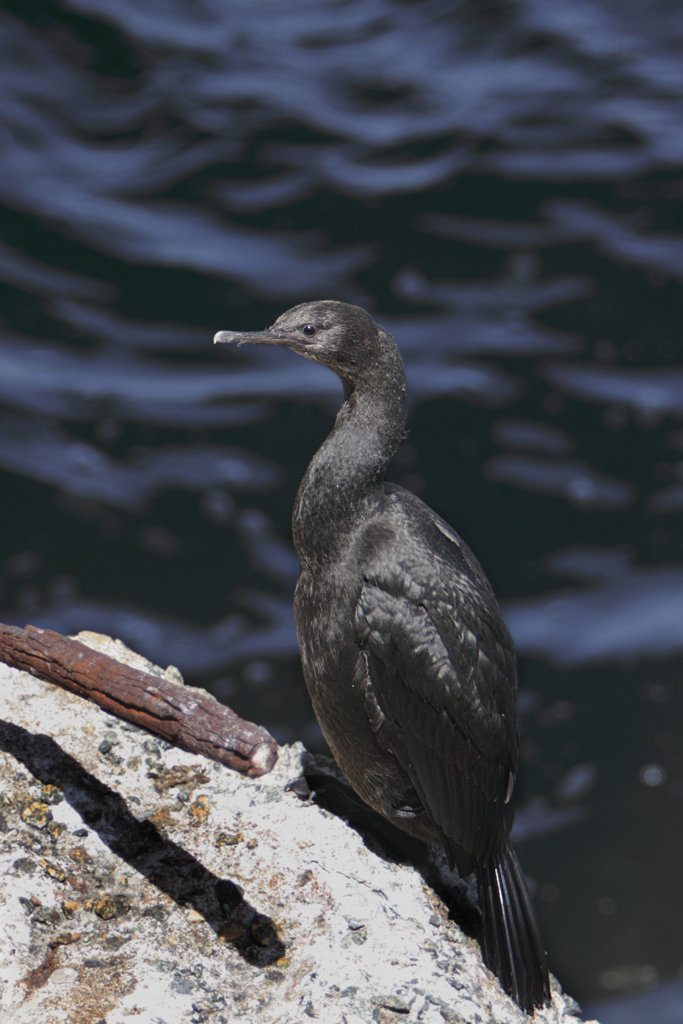
Cormorant chick in Monterey Bay

Lovers Point State Marine Reserve (SMR) is one of four small marine protected areas located near the cities of Monterey and Pacific Grove, at the southern end of Monterey Bay on California’s central coast. The four MPAs together encompass 2.96 square miles (7.7 km^{2}). The SMR protects all marine life within its boundaries. Fishing and take of all living marine resources is prohibited.

== History ==
Lovers Point State Marine Reserve was established in September 2007 by the California Department of Fish & Game. It was one of 29 marine protected areas adopted during the first phase of the Marine Life Protection Act Initiative. The Marine Life Protection Act Initiative (or MLPAI) is a collaborative public process to create a statewide network of marine protected areas along the California coastline.

== Geography and natural features ==
Lovers Point SMR is located off the coast of the Monterey Peninsula, at the southern end of Monterey Bay. It covers an area of.30 sq. miles (0.8 km²). The reserve is directly offshore from Lovers Point Park, a small local park.

Lovers Point SMR is one of four marine protected areas bordering the Monterey Peninsula. It is between Edward F. Ricketts State Marine Conservation Area and Pacific Grove Marine Gardens State Marine Conservation Area. Farther to the west is Asilomar State Marine Reserve. All four areas are included within the Monterey Bay National Marine Sanctuary.

This marine protected area is bounded by the mean high tide line, and straight lines connecting the following points in the order listed:
36.6186°N 121.9013°W
36.6210°N 121.8953°W;
36.6230°N 121.8976°W;
36.6265°N 121.9120°W; and
36.6267°N 121.9150°W.

== Habitat and wildlife ==
The Monterey Peninsula includes extensive tidepools brimming with life. Its sandy beaches are used by pupping harbor seals, and dense kelp beds offshore provide shelter for sea otters. The Lovers Point SMR provides habitat for a variety of marine life, and includes kelp forests, beaches, rocky intertidal zones, and soft and hard bottom underwater environments.

== Recreation and nearby attractions ==
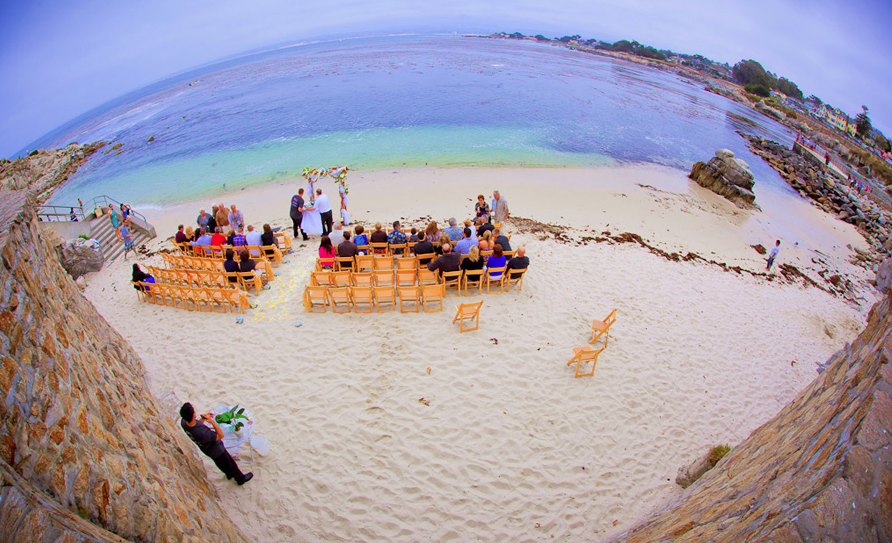
Wedding in Lover's Point

The natural environment and ocean resources of the Monterey Peninsula draw millions of visitors from around the world each year, including more than 65,000 scuba divers drawn by the area’s easy access, wildlife, and kelp forests.

The Monterey Bay Aquarium is a tourist attraction featuring a 28-foot (8.5 m) living kelp forest. The exhibit includes many of the species native to the nearby marine protected areas. The aquarium also houses sea otters, intertidal wildlife, and occasionally sea turtles.

In addition to diving and visiting the aquarium, people visit the Monterey Bay for kayaking, whale watching, charter fishing, surfing, bird watching, tidepooling and walking on the beach.

Lovers Point is also where the Kelp Krawlers, a local open water swimming group, holds its weekly Sunday swim.

California's marine protected areas encourage recreational and educational uses of the ocean. Activities such as kayaking, diving, snorkeling, and swimming are allowed unless otherwise restricted.

== Safety ==
The beach is periodically closed due to sewage contamination. The Monterey County Health Department updates their website with beach conditions and information about closures.

On June 22, 2022, a 60-year-old swimmer was attacked by a shark at Lover's Point Beach, in the Lovers Point State Marine Reserve. The swimmer, left with major injuries, was aided to safety by bystanders, and taken to a hospital in Salinas. The Monterey Fire Department used a drone to conduct a search for the shark, but did not locate it.

== Scientific monitoring ==
In accordance with the Marine Life Protection Act, select marine protected areas along California’s central coast are being monitored by scientists to track their effectiveness and learn more about ocean health. Similar studies in marine protected areas located off of the Santa Barbara Channel Islands have already detected gradual improvements in fish size and number.

Local scientific and educational institutions involved in the monitoring include Stanford University’s Hopkins Marine Station, University of California Santa Cruz, Moss Landing Marine Laboratories and Cal Poly San Luis Obispo. Research methods include hook-and-line sampling, intertidal and scuba diver surveys, and the use of Remote Operated Vehicle (ROV) submarines.
