= Asilomar State Beach =

State park in California

- Asilomar State Beach and Conference Grounds State Park
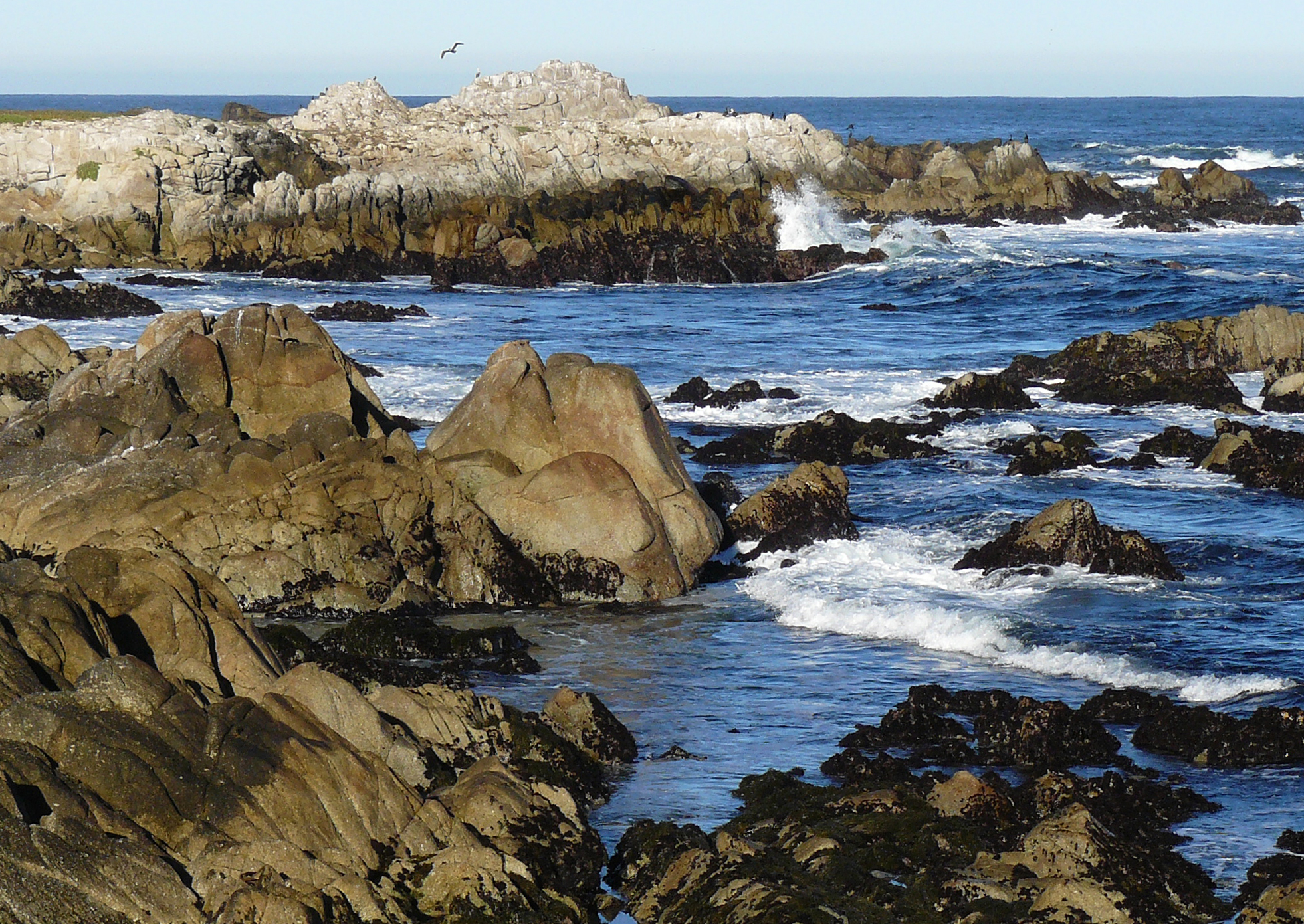
- Rocky shore at Asilomar State Beach

- Location within California Location within the United States
- Location: Monterey County, California, United States
- Nearest city: Pacific Grove, California
- Coordinates: 36°37′12″N 121°56′17″W
- Area: 107 acres (43 ha)
- Established: 1951
- Governing body: California Department of Parks and Recreation Official website

Asilomar State Beach, officially Asilomar State Beach and Conference Grounds State Park, is a state park unit of California, United States. It provides public access to rocky coast and dune habitat on the Monterey Peninsula. The property includes the Asilomar Conference Grounds, a conference center built by the YWCA in 1913 that is now a National Historic Landmark. The 107-acre (43 ha) site is located in Pacific Grove and offers overnight lodging and views of the forest, surf and sand.

Asilomar (meaning "Asylum or refuge by the sea" and pronounced a-SIL-o-mar) is a combination of two Spanish words: "asilo" and "mar". It is part of the native homeland of the Rumsen Ohlone people.

== Description ==
=== Beach area ===
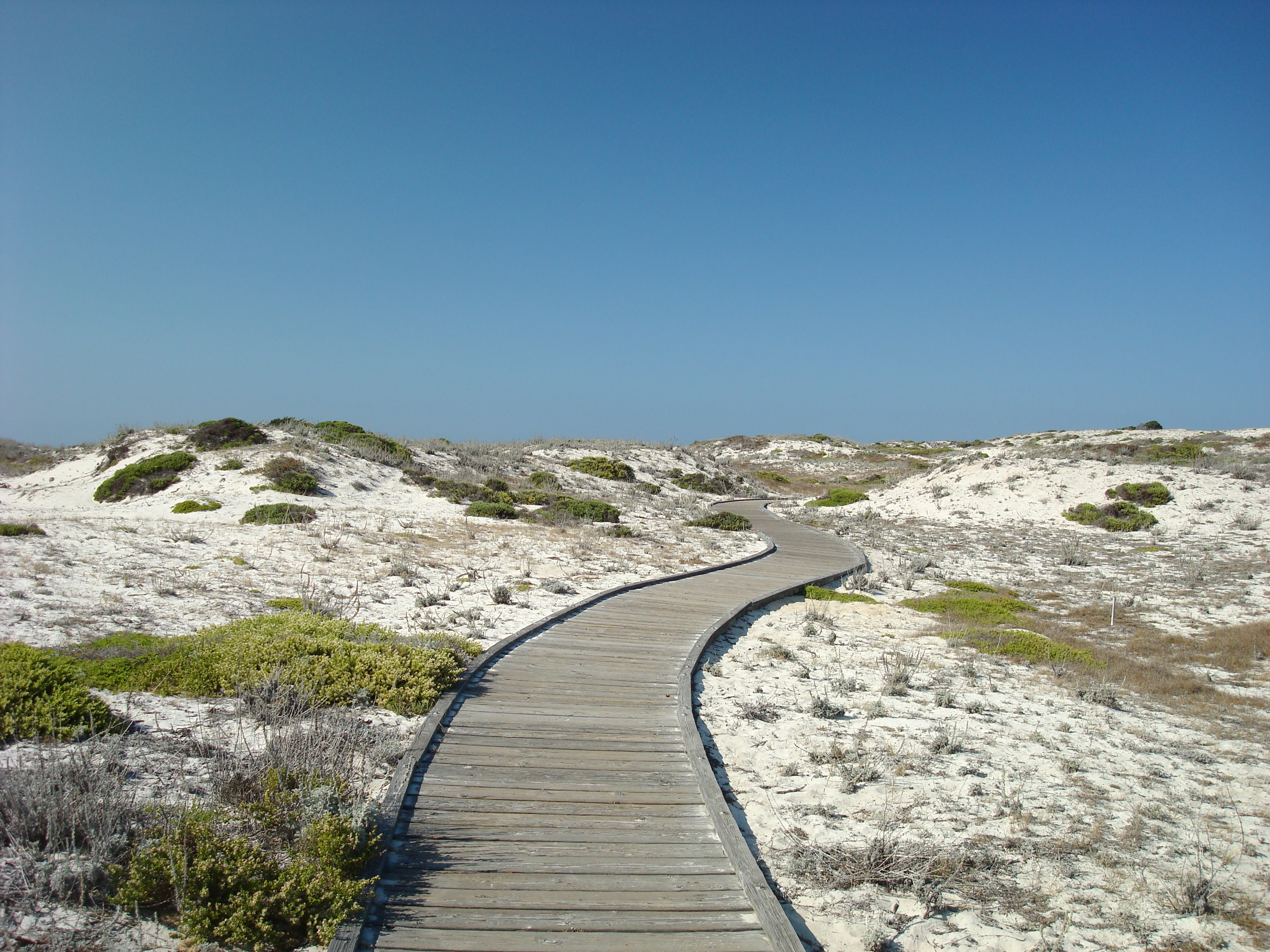
Wooden boardwalk through natural dune habitat

The beach area is a narrow, 1-mile (1.6 km) strip of sandy beach and rocky coves. A 1-mile (1.6 km) trail, which runs through the dunes, is open to pedestrians. This trail is wheelchair-accessible, and a beach wheelchair is available at the Conference Grounds front desk, located inside the Phoebe Apperson Hearst Social Hall. Bicycling is allowed on the paved bike lane along the road, running parallel to the Coast Trail. The ocean off shore is protected as the Asilomar State Marine Reserve, part of the Monterey Bay National Marine Sanctuary. The rocky coves are home to thousands of species, some of which are unique to the bay. As a sanctuary, it is illegal to disturb biota, i.e., collection and removal of shells and/or live specimens.

=== Asilomar Conference Grounds ===
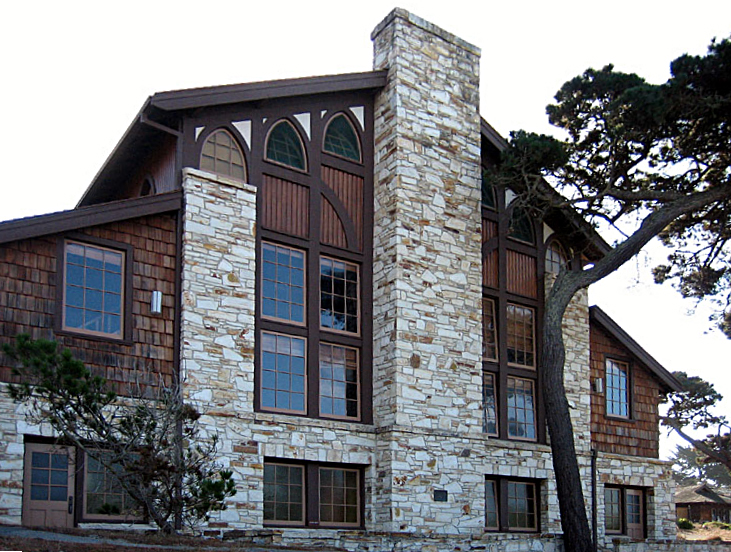
Merrill Hall, Asilomar Conference Grounds

Asilomar State Beach incorporates Asilomar Conference Grounds, designed in the Arts & Crafts style by architect Julia Morgan. The facility was built in 1913 as a conference center and summer camp for the YWCA. Morgan designed and built 16 buildings on the property, of which 13 are still standing. The retreat was declared a National Historic Landmark in 1987 for its role in the development of the YWCA and the resort nature of nearby Monterey, California.

== Recreation ==
The water in the vicinity of Asilomar State Beach is known for rip tides and unpredictable surf. The water is cold compared to other beaches in the Monterey area, due to its exposure to the open ocean and the upwelling of cold water from nearby Monterey Canyon, which funnels the icy water right to shore at this location. Despite the cold water the area is popular with surfers and visitors from around the world.

The beach does not feature a bathroom facility. Bathrooms available to the public are located at the Asilomar Conference Grounds inside the Phoebe Apperson Hearst Social Hall.

== In popular culture ==
The 2009 film The Shift by self-help advocate Wayne Dyer was shot at Asilomar Beach and Conference Grounds.

== See also ==
- Point Lobos
- List of beaches in California
- List of California state parks
  - List of California State Beaches
