= Salinas River State Beach =

Beach at the mouth of Salinas River at Monterey Bay, California, United States

Coordinates: 36°46′59″N 121°47′44″W

Salinas River State Beach is a beach at the river mouth of the Salinas River at Monterey Bay, in Monterey County, California.

It is located at the south end of Moss Landing, California. The park can be accessed from the Potrero exit off of Highway 1, in Moss Landing. It is part of the 99 miles of Monterey County coastline. The park includes the Salinas River Mouth Natural Preserve and the Salinas River Dunes Natural Preserve.

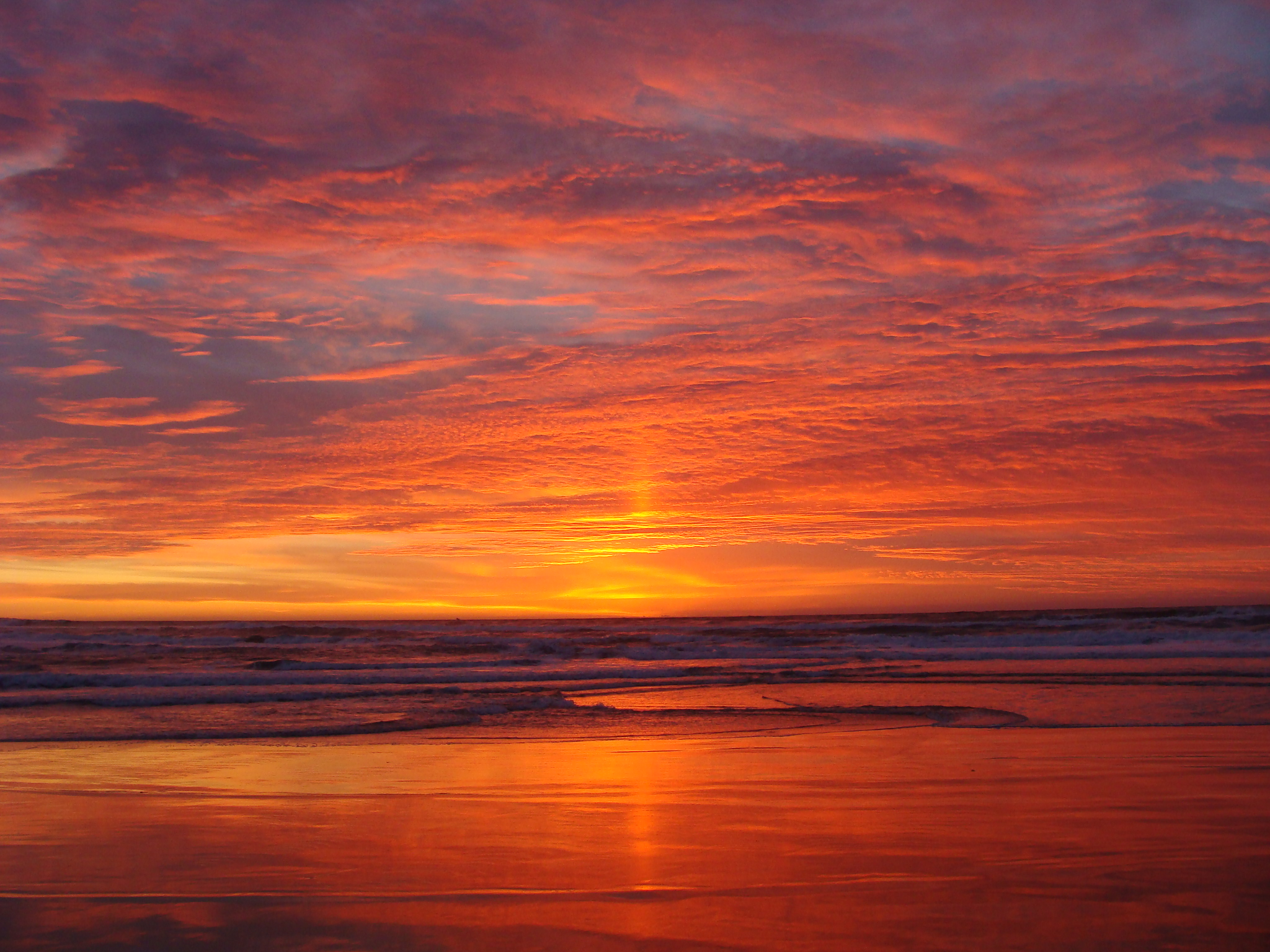
Salinas River State Beach at sunset

== Features ==
Visitors to this beach come for nature watching, beach combing, fishing, photography, and taking a walk, rather than swimming or surfing. It contains the remnants of a half sunken barge. Water conditions are often adverse; the temperature is too low, the waves are too strong, and the surf is unpredictable. In addition, there are no lifeguards present.

== Ecology ==
Among the species found on the beach and its dunes are California brown pelican, red-tailed hawk, American kestrel, western snowy plover, western gull, black phoebe, California scrub jay, California towhee, and white-crowned sparrow.

== See also ==
- Monterey Bay
- Salinas River (California)
