= Monterey State Beach =

State park in California, United States

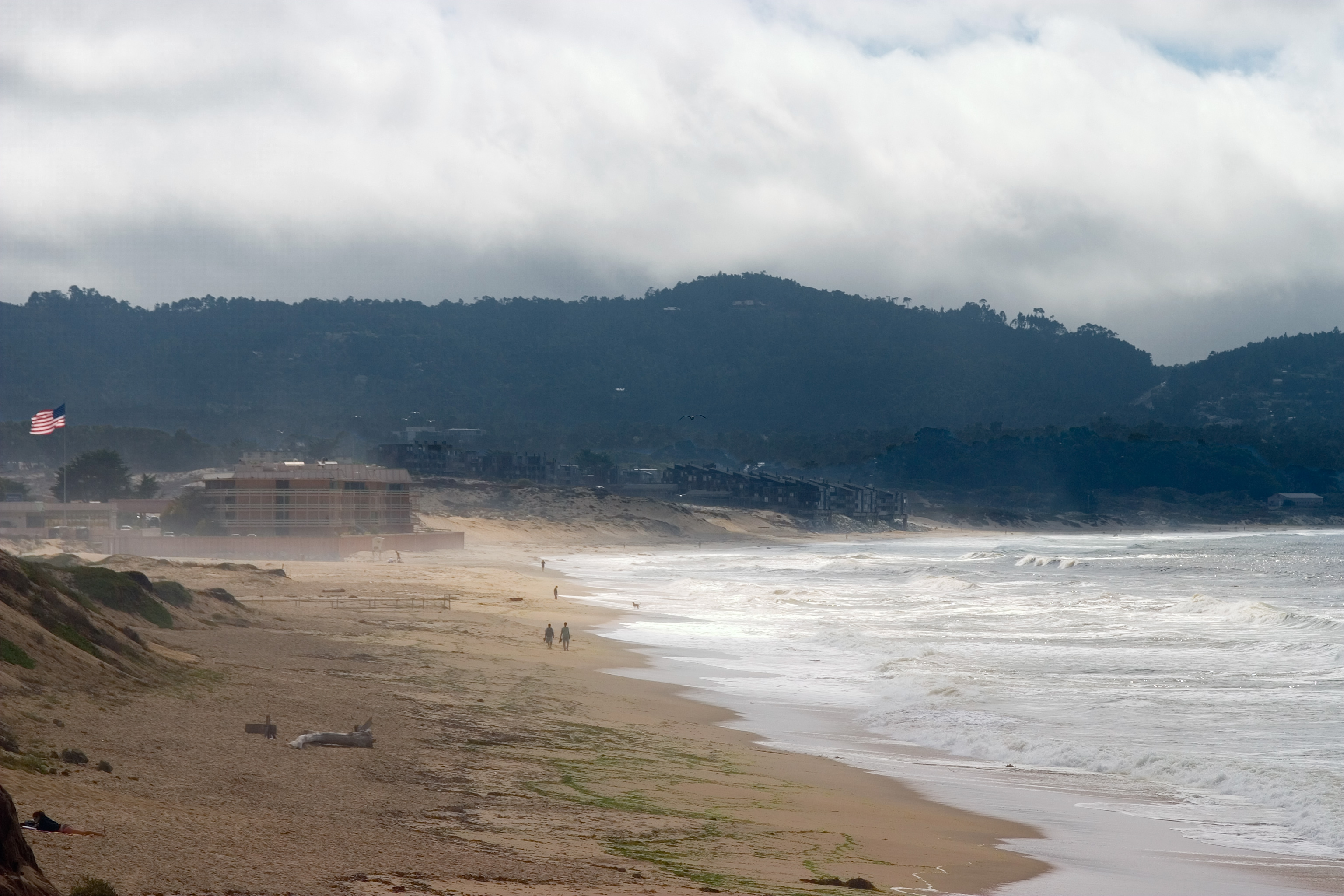
- Monterey State Beach

- Location within California Location within the United States
- Location: Monterey, California, United States
- Nearest city: Monterey, California
- Coordinates: 36.6001°N 121.8822°W
- Governing body: California Department of Parks and Recreation

Monterey State Beach is a protected beach on southern Monterey Bay in Monterey County, California. It extends from the city of Monterey to Seaside.

The Seaside end of Monterey State Beach is a popular launch spot for paragliders. Surf fishing is permitted.

== See also ==
- List of beaches in California
- List of California state parks
