= Edward F. Ricketts State Marine Conservation Area =

Marine protected area in California

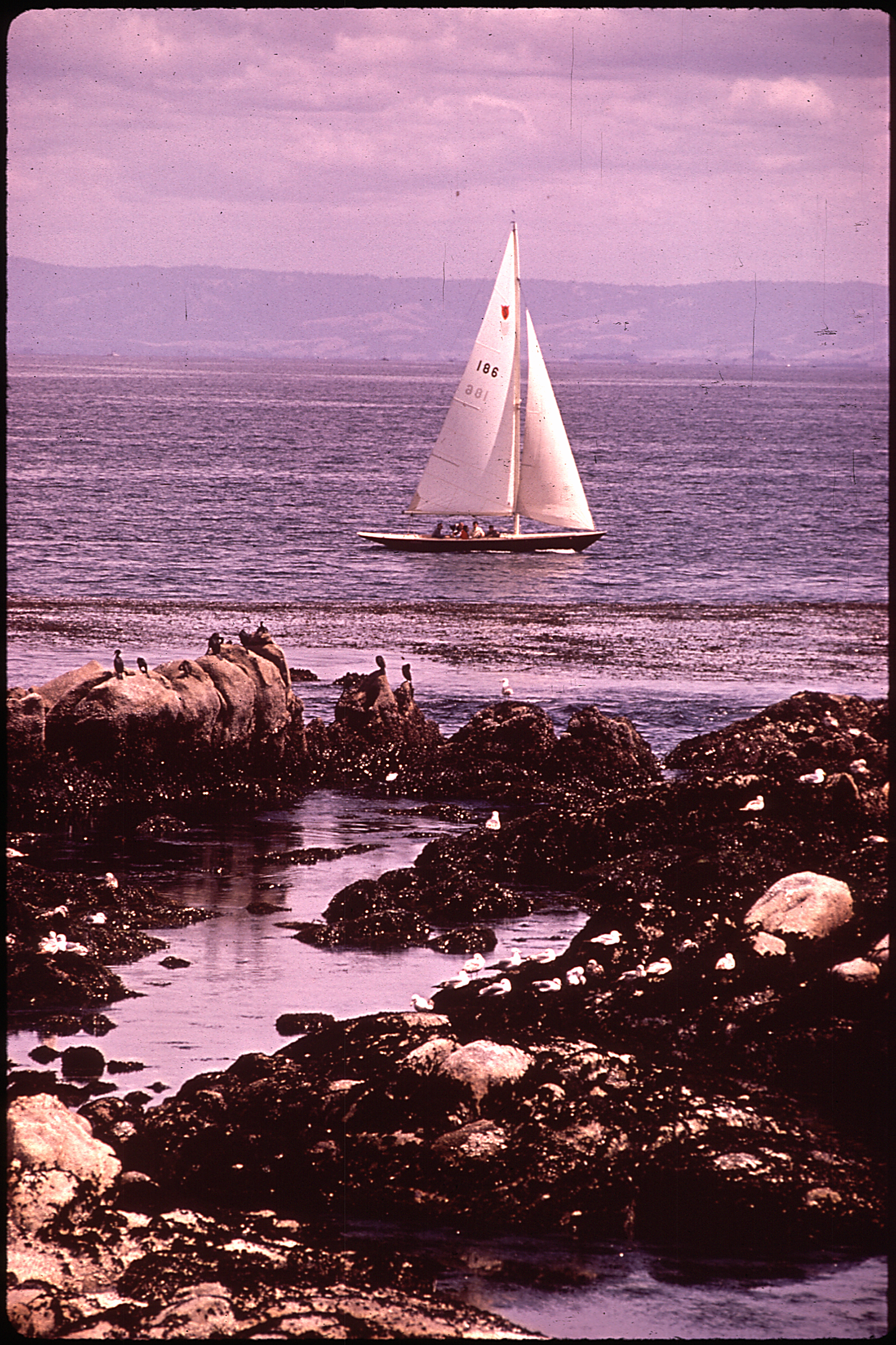
Monterey Bay

Edward F. Ricketts State Marine Conservation Area is one of four small marine protected areas located near the cities of Monterey and Pacific Grove, at the southern end of Monterey Bay on California’s central coast. The four areas together encompass 2.96 square miles (7.7 km^{2}). Within SMCAs fishing and take of all living marine resources is prohibited except the recreational take of finfish by hook-and-line and the commercial take of giant and bull kelp under certain conditions.

== History ==
The two State Marine Conservation Areas were established in September 2007 by the California Department of Fish & Game. They were two of 29 marine protected areas adopted during the first phase of the Marine Life Protection Act Initiative, which created a statewide network of marine protected areas along the California coastline.

== Geography and natural features ==
Edward F. Ricketts State Marine Conservation Area is located off the coast of the Monterey Peninsula, at the southern end of Monterey Bay. It covers an area of .22 sq. miles (0.56 km²). The reserve is directly offshore from the Monterey Bay Aquarium and Cannery Row. It was named for Edward F. Ricketts (1897–1948) who founded the Pacific Biological Laboratories in Monterey. It is the easternmost of four marine protected areas bordering the Monterey Peninsula.

Edward F. Ricketts SMCA is bounded by straight lines connecting the following points in the order listed: 36°36.50′N 121°53.37′W, 36°37.25′N 121°53.78′W, and 36°37.10′N 121°54.09′W, then the mean high tide line along the coast back to the breakwater of Monterey Harbor.

The Lovers Point State Marine Reserve is adjacent to the west of Ricketts SMCA, and then beyond that the Pacific Grove Marine Gardens State Marine Conservation Area. It is bounded by the mean high tide line and straight lines connecting the following points in the order listed: 36°37.6′N 121°54.91′W, 36°37.6′N 121°54.75′W, 36°38.7′N 121°55.4′W, 36°38.9′N 121°56.6′W, and 36°38.22′N 121°56.15′W, then along to coast back to the first point.

Farther south and west is the Asilomar State Marine Reserve. All four areas are included within the Monterey Bay National Marine Sanctuary.

== Habitat and wildlife ==
The Monterey Peninsula includes extensive tidepools brimming with life. Its sandy beaches are used by pupping harbor seals, and dense kelp beds offshore provide shelter for sea otters. SMCAs provide habitat for a variety of marine life, and includes kelp forest, beach, rocky intertidal, and soft and hard bottom.

== Recreation ==
The natural beauty and ocean resources of the Monterey Peninsula draw millions of visitors from around the world each year, including more than 65,000 scuba divers drawn by the area’s easy access, variety of wildlife, and massive kelp forests.

In addition to diving and visiting the aquarium, people enjoy the Monterey Bay by kayaking, whale watching, charter fishing, and eating an array of locally sourced seafood restaurants.

California’s marine protected areas encourage recreational and educational uses of the ocean. Activities such as kayaking, diving, snorkeling, and swimming are allowed unless otherwise restricted.

== Scientific monitoring ==
As specified by the Marine Life Protection Act, select marine protected areas along California’s central coast are being monitored by scientists to track their effectiveness and learn more about ocean health. Similar studies in marine protected areas located off of the Santa Barbara Channel Islands have already detected gradual improvements in fish size and number. Local scientific and educational institutions involved in the monitoring include the Hopkins Marine Station *located between the two SMCAs), the Monterey Bay Aquarium Research Institute (MBARI), and Moss Landing Marine Laboratories. Research methods include hook-and-line sampling, scuba diver surveys, and the use of Remote Operated Vehicle (ROV) submarines.
