= William Adams =

William Adams may refer to:

== Military ==
- William Adams (Royal Navy officer, died 1748), British naval officer
- William Adams (Royal Navy officer, born 1716) (1716–1763), British naval officer
- William E. Adams (1939–1971), US Army officer and Medal of Honor recipient
- William Wirt Adams (1819–1888), Confederate States of America army general

== Musicians ==
- Billy Adams, banjo player, a former member of Dexys Midnight Runners
- will.i.am (William James Adams, Jr., born 1975), musician, producer; member of The Black Eyed Peas
- Willy Northpole (William Adams, born 1980), rapper signed to Ludacris' DTP Records
- Billy Adams (rockabilly musician) (1940–2019), American rockabilly musician

== Politicians ==
- Acton Adams (William Acton Blakeway Adams, 1843–1924), New Zealand politician
- Billy Adams (politician) (William Herbert Adams, 1861–1954), Governor of Colorado
- William Adams (British Columbia politician) (1851–1936), rancher and politician in British Columbia, Canada
- William Adams (1752–1811), MP for Totnes
- William Adams (New Zealand politician) (1811–1884), New Zealand politician
- William E. Adams (New York politician) (1922–1983), New York politician
- William G. Adams (1923–2005), Canadian politician
- William Henry Adams (1809–1865), British Conservative MP for Boston and Chief Justice of Hong Kong
- William Taylor Adams (1822–1897), author & politician
- William Thomas Adams (1884–1949), British Member of Parliament for Hammersmith South, 1945–1949
- Willie Adams (politician) (born 1934), Canadian politician
- William Weston Adams (1786–1831), American politician, planter and medical doctor
- William H. Adams (Virginia politician) (1872–1958), American politician in the Virginia House of Delegates

== Science, technology and philosophy ==
- William Adams (locomotive engineer) (1823–1904), British locomotive engineer
- William Adams (Master of Pembroke) (1706/7–1789), English scholar
- William Adams (oculist) (1783–1827), English ophthalmic surgeon
- William Bridges Adams (1797–1872), British inventor, author & locomotive engineer
- William Grylls Adams (1836–1915), professor of natural philosophy

== Sportspeople ==
=== American football ===
- Bill Adams (offensive lineman) (born 1950), American football player
- Bill Adams (American football coach), American college football coach
- Billy Ray Adams (1938–2023), American football player
- Willie Adams (American football) (1941–2019), American football player

=== Association football (soccer) ===
- Bill Adams (footballer, born 1902) (1902–1963), Southampton FC right half back
- Bill Adams (footballer, born 1921) (1921–1997), English footballer
- Billy Adams (footballer, born 1897) (1897–1945), footballer for Barrow and West Bromwich Albion
- Billy Adams (footballer, born 1919) (1919–1989), English footballer
- William Adams (footballer), footballer who played for Walsall and West Bromwich Albion

=== Other sports ===
- Bill Adams (ice hockey) (1897–1978), Canadian ice hockey player
- Bill Adams (Australian footballer) (1900–1973), VFL player and coach
- William Adams (cricketer, born 1885) (1885–1957), English cricketer
- William Adams (cricketer, born 1905) (1905–1971), English cricketer
- Willie Adams (1910s pitcher) (1890–1937), American baseball player
- Willie Adams (1990s pitcher) (born 1972), American baseball player (Oakland Athletics)
- Willie Adams (basketball) (1911–1992), American basketball player
- Smiley Adams (William Ernest Adams, 1935–2003), racehorse trainer

== Writers ==
- William Adams (author) (1814–1848), English religious writer
- William Davenport Adams (1851–1904), English writer and journalist, son of W. H. D. Adams
- William Henry Davenport Adams (1828–1891), English writer and journalist
- William Howard Adams (1926–2023), American author, curator and lecturer on history and garden design
- William Y. Adams (1927–2019), American archaeologist and anthropologist, author of Nubia: Corridor to Africa
- W. E. Adams (1832–1906), English radical and journalist
- William Lee Adams, journalist and founder of Wiwibloggs

== Clergy ==
- William Adams (Dedham) (1650–1685), minister of the First Church and Parish in Dedham
- William Adams (educator) (1813–1897), co-founder of Nashotah House
- William Adams (minister) (1807–1880), American religious leader and college president
- William Forbes Adams (1833–1920), bishop of the Episcopal Diocese of Easton

== Other ==
- William Adams (samurai) (1564–1620), English maritime navigator, shipbuilder and advisor to the Japanese government
- William Adams (haberdasher) (1585–1661), London haberdasher and founder of Adams' Grammar School
- William Adams (lawyer) (1772–1851), English lawyer, helped negotiate settlements with the US c.1814/1815
- William Adams (potter) (c. 1746–1805), North Staffordshire potter, founded the Greengates Pottery
- William Bridges-Adams (1889–1965), British stage director
- William Drea Adams, president of Bucknell University, 1995–2000; president of Colby College, 2000–2014
- William Adams (mining engineer) (1813–1876)
- William Jackson Adams (1860–1934), justice of the North Carolina Supreme Court
- William L. Adams (pioneer) (1821–1906), American writer, newspaper editor and doctor from Oregon
- William L. Adams (businessman) (1914–2011), Baltimore businessman and venture capitalist
- William S. Adams (1892–1930), American cinematographer
- William Adams (lifesaver) (1864–1913), English lifesaver from Gorleston
- W. G. S. Adams (William George Stewart Adams, 1874–1966), British political scientist and public servant
- William M. Adams (born 1955), British geographer

== See also ==
- Adams (surname)
- Bill Adam (born 1946), Scottish racing driver
- William Adam (disambiguation)
