= William Adam =

William Adam may refer to:

- Guillaume Adam (died c.1341), also known as William Adam, French archbishop and missionary
- William Adam (architect) (1689–1748), Scottish architect, mason, and entrepreneur
- William Adam of Blair Adam (1751–1839), Scottish member of the British parliament and judge
- William Patrick Adam (1823–1881), British colonial administrator and Liberal politician
- William Adam (minister) (1796–1881), Scottish Baptist minister, missionary, abolitionist
- William Adam (artist) (1846–1931), English landscape artist who worked in California for 33 years
- William Adam (malacologist) (1909–1988), Belgian malacologist
- William Adam (trumpeter) (1917–2013), American trumpeter, and professor emeritus at Indiana University
- William Augustus Adam (1865–1940), British and army officer and Conservative Party politician
- Will Adam (born 1969), archdeacon of Canterbury
- Billy Adam, Scottish footballer

== See also ==
- Bill Adam (born 1946), racing driver
- William Adams (disambiguation)
