= Pacific Grove Museum of Natural History =

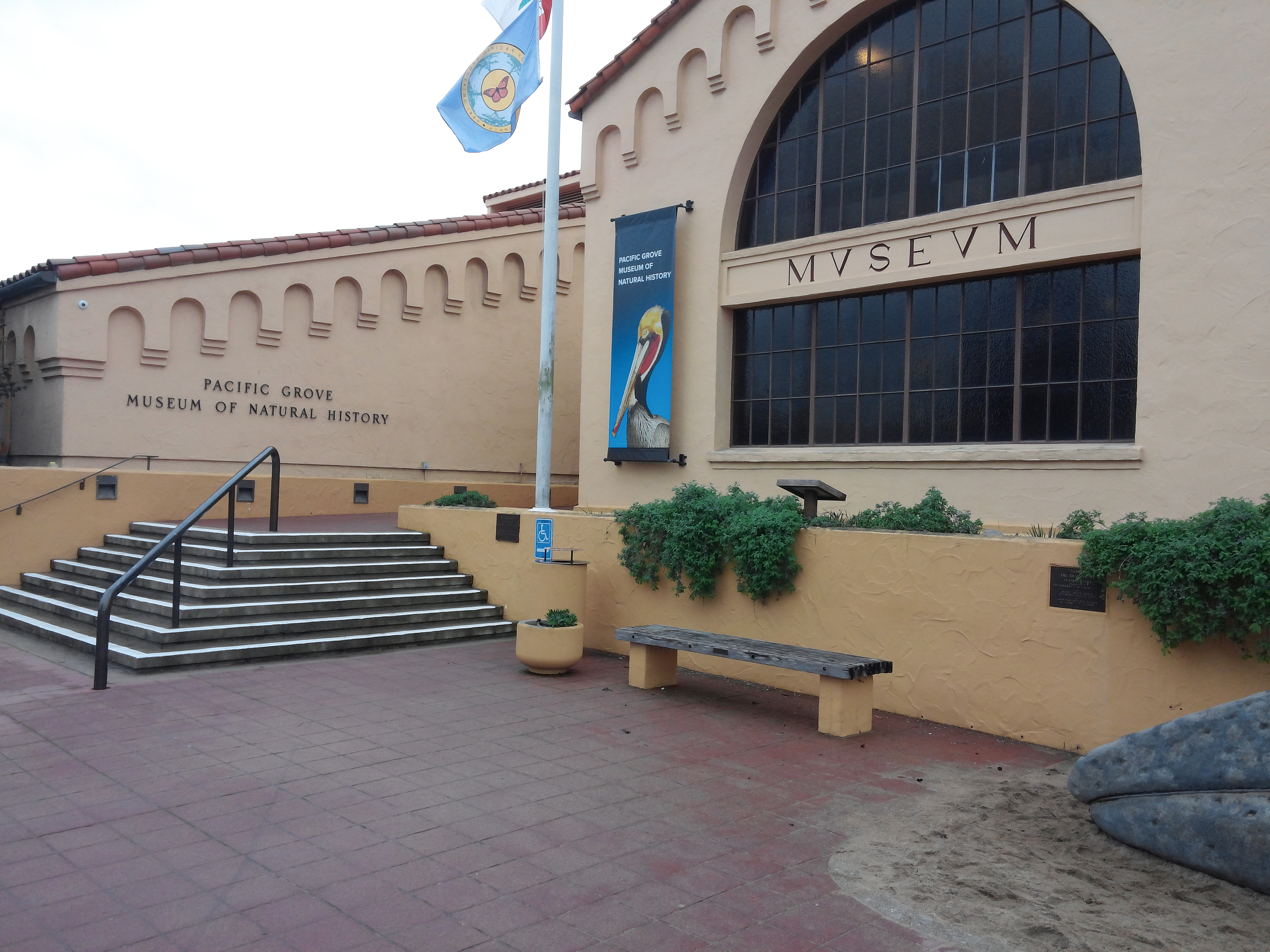
- Exterior of the museum
- Established: 1883
- Location: 165 Forest Avenue; Pacific Grove, California
- Coordinates: 36.621835°N 121.917136°W
- Type: Natural history museum
- Website: http://www.pgmuseum.org

The Pacific Grove Museum of Natural History is a museum of natural history located near the Monterey Bay Aquarium in Pacific Grove, California, United States. The museum is a living field guide of the California Central Coast showcasing local native plants, animals, geology, and cultural histories.

The museum opened its doors in 1883 among the first wave of natural history museums established in America. Naturalists of this era, such as John Muir and Louis Agassiz, began a national tradition of hands-on science education and nature preservation.

The museum is accredited with the American Alliance of Museums.

== Exhibits ==
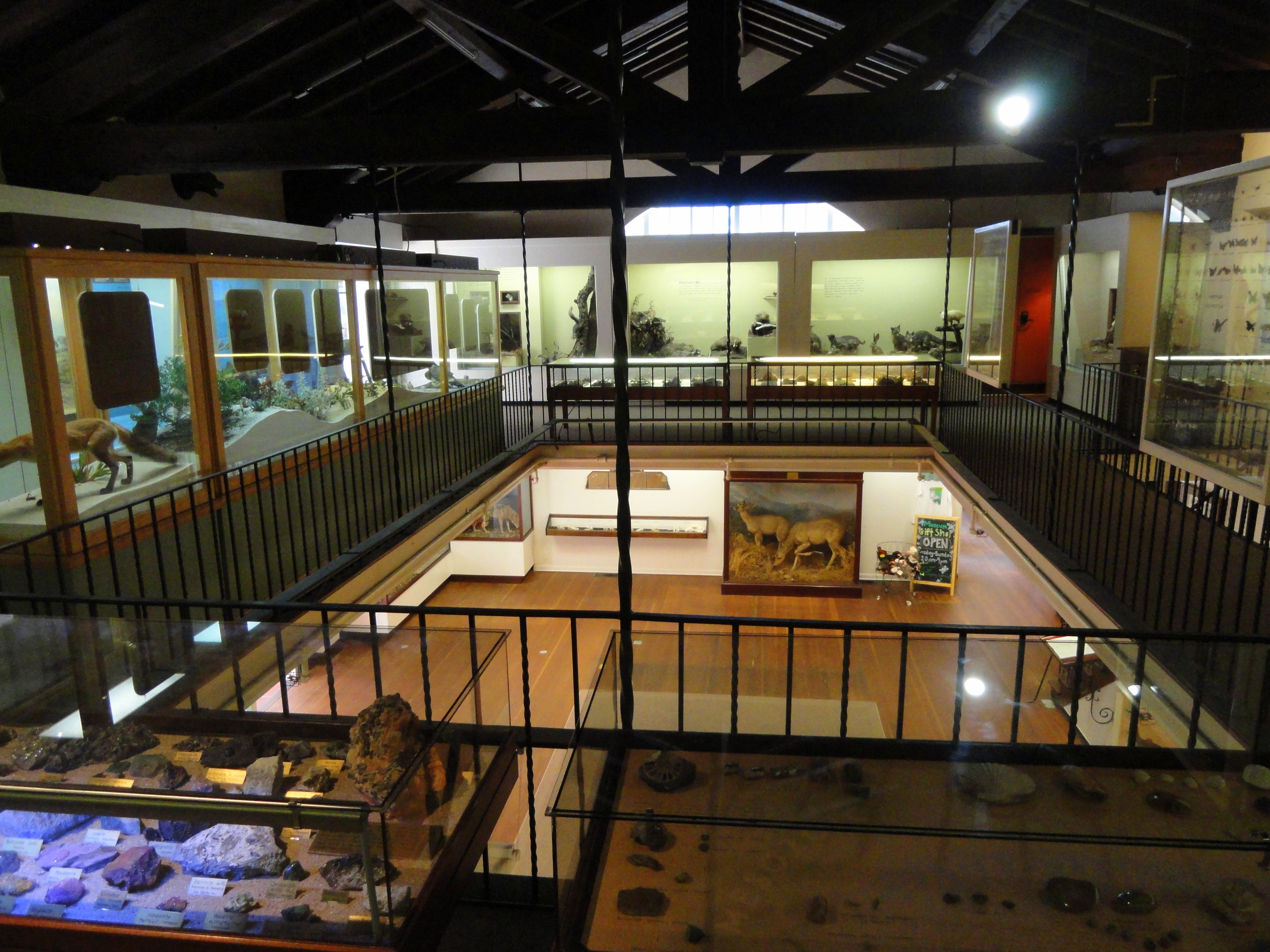
Interior of the Pacific Grove Museum of Natural History

The museum's exhibits provide a field guide of the California Central Coast: birds and wildlife, plants, geology and cultural richness. The museum highlights unique features of the California Central Coast.

Guests to the museum are greeted by "Sandy," a life-size sculpture of an adult female gray whale designed and created by artist Larry Foster. The whale was purchased in 1982 through a creative community fund raising campaign with the assistance of the local American Cetacean Society and is dedicated to the Children of Monterey County.

The museum's collection of birds from Monterey County, California features over 400 bird specimens on display, including local highlights such as the California condor and nationally significant bird specimens.

Pacific Grove is the largest public monarch butterfly overwintering site in Monterey County. From Thanksgiving to Valentine's Day, the monarchs cluster and fly about Pacific Grove's Monarch Grove Sanctuary. The museum has an exhibition of the monarch's life cycle and endangered migration. The museum monarch volunteers also enhance monarch viewing at the sanctuary during the overwintering season providing viewing scopes and interpretation.

The museum's backyard features over 100 plant species native to Monterey County arranged into five bioregions; coastal scrub, chaparral, mixed oak woodlands, butterfly host and nectar plants, and ethnobotany.

== Events ==
The museum's Annual Wildflower Show is held the third weekend of April. The show displays more than seven hundred Monterey County wildflower species making it the largest wildflower show in the Northern and Western Hemispheres. The museum began the show in 1962 in partnership with the Monterey Bay Chapter of the California Native Plant Society.

The museum's annual Illustrating Nature exhibition is held in May. This exhibition showcases the graduating class of CSUMB Extended Education's Science Illustration Program.

== Education ==
The museum provides science and cultural education for the California Central Coast and currently serves Monterey, Santa Cruz, San Benito, and Stanislaus counties. The museum's complete suite of educational services to families and to PreK – 12th grade children are:

- Science Saturdays are free, hands-on cultural, science and art activities on the last Saturday of each month except June, July and December. Themes vary each month.
- Class Field Trips are free and available on a first-come, first-served basis. Museum field trips consistently rate high on evaluations of meeting learning objectives and students having fun. All museum lesson plans are aligned with the PreK -5th grade Next Generation Science Standards.
- Monarch Grove Sanctuary Class Field Trips are freely provided to PreK-5th grade classes by the museum monarch docents during the monarch overwintering season.
- Class Outreach Programs are freely delivered to serve schools unable to travel to the museum. A museum educator travels to the school and delivers a program to one or more PreK-5th grade classes. The delivered program is customized to meet the teacher's needs and teaches a topic area specific to Next Generation Science Standards. Topics are varied including gems and minerals, Native Americans, life cycles, and mammals.

== Community science ==
The museum hosts multiple community science programs.

- LiMPETS (Long-term Monitoring Program and Experiential Training for Students) - LiMPETS provides hands-on coastal monitoring experiences that empower teachers, middle school and high school students, and the community to conduct real field research as scientists and become ocean stewards.
- Western Monarch Count - in conjunction with the Xerces Society for the Conservation of Invertebrates, the Pacific Grove Museum tracks the population of the threatened Western Monarch Butterfly. In addition, the Museum tracks weekly the population of monarch butterflies at the Monarch Sanctuary, and is one of the only sites that tracks their population regularly throughout the monarch season. This program is available from October - March.
- Black Oystercatcher Monitoring - in partnership with the California Coastal National Monument (CCNM) and other organizations, this tracks the success of a local shorebird, the Black Oystercatcher. It is an indicator species for the rocky shore habitat: by studying its success over time, scientists can understand the impacts happening for the entire ecosystem.
- MPA Watch (Marine Protected Area) - in partnership with WILDCOAST, this program monitors human use of the marine protected areas around the Monterey Peninsula.
- Watershed Guardians - Watershed Guardians is a program for middle, high, and college students to study the health of local Monterey County watersheds, like the Carmel River. They collect and record real-time water quality data.

== History ==
The Chautauqua (shuh-TAH-kwuh) Literary and Scientific Circle established its Pacific Coast branch at the Chautauqua Hall in Pacific Grove in June 1879. A two-week Chautauqua assembly was held here every summer, featuring lessons, exhibits, lectures, picnics, and concerts. Over the years several members felt the need to have a storeroom and exhibition site for the natural specimens collected. A resolution was made in 1881 to have this accomplished. In 1883, a petition calling for this building was signed by Professor H. B. Norton, Dr. J. H. Wyeth, Dr. C. L. Anderson, Miss Lucy M. Washburn, Miss Mary E. B. Norton, and Professor Josiah Keep. The petition was sent to F. S. Douty, secretary of the Pacific Improvement Company, and a small wooden octagonal building located on Grand Avenue became the new Chautauqua Museum's first home in what is now Jewell Park, across from the museum's current site.

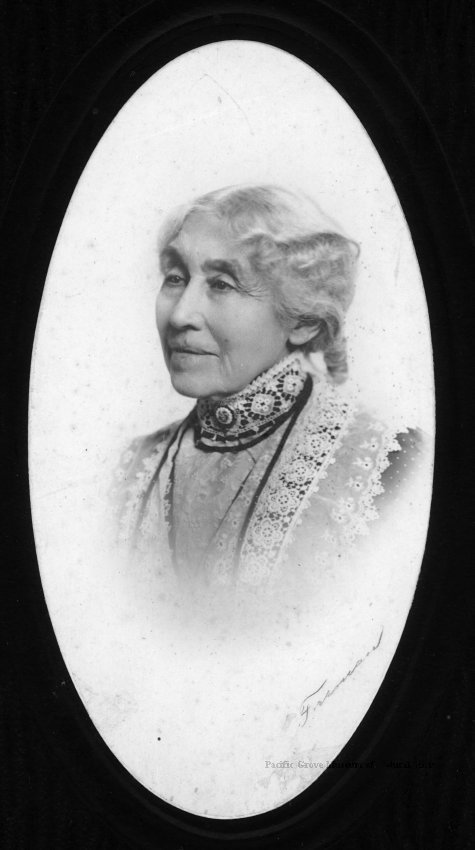
Mary E. B. Norton- American teacher, botanist and museum curator (1832-1917)

Since the Chautauqua institution was a college, its faculty and students collected many specimens from the surrounding countryside and brought them to the Chautauqua Museum to be exhibited. The first important specimen collections were of shells, sea mosses, evergreen cones, and other land plants. These collections continued to expand as Pacific Grove's population grew. The museum eventually grew large enough that its own management was needed. In 1899 the museum began to be organized, largely by Miss Norton. The Chautauqua donated the museum building and its 2100 specimens to the new organization in July 1900. This organization became the Pacific Grove Museum Association in November 1900. Thomas W. Cowan was its president; Miss Norton, curator; B. A. Eardley, secretary and treasurer; and E. B. Lewis, recording secretary.

The association devoted itself to developing the museum, presenting winter lectures to members for free, and a spring exhibition of natural history and local art. This event was, according to a June 1901 newspaper, a great success: "The beautiful in art and nature and the rare and curious in natural history were well represented at the exhibit of the Pacific Grove Museum Association. ... The dingy old structure has been skillfully decorated ... and converted into a most charming and inviting spot."

In 1902, through the influence of Miss Kate Coffin, the Pacific Improvement Company presented the association with the half-block of land where the modern museum stands, along with the buildings which already stood there. These buildings were remodeled into one larger building and the original octagonal building was moved across the street to join this new building. The association now had plenty of room for study, work, and storage, as well as outdoor space to be preserved for its native plants.

By 1904 the museum had started to receive animal specimens. In 1909 the membership of the association numbered about eighty people. However, the museum was poor during this time, getting by from small membership dues, few donations, the selling of some plants, and the giving of entertainments. Many of the museum's specimens were sold to San Francisco shortly after its famous 1906 earthquake. Finally, it was decided the museum would have to be supported by the City of Pacific Grove. The City's ownership of the museum came about in 1917.

Dr. Ann Lukens donated $5,000 to the museum because of her friendship with Miss Coffin, but the museum's greatest donation was through Pacific Grove citizen Mrs. Lucy Chase. A $14,000 new museum building was constructed in 1932 on its current site. The majority of the money needed for this project was donated by Chase, and the building was opened to the public on December 21, 1932, her ninetieth birthday.

In 1933, some items that would be known as "curios" today began to be removed from the museum in an effort to devote it solely to natural history. The American Association of Museums referred to the museum as the "best of its size in the United States" in 1935. The Pacific Grove Museum Association became the Pacific Grove Museum of Natural History Association in 1967 and is now also associated with the Point Pinos Lighthouse and the Monarch Grove Sanctuary.

== Sources ==
- A Piney Paradise by Monterey Bay by Lucy Neely McLane.
