= Julia Platt =

American embryologist, politician and mayor

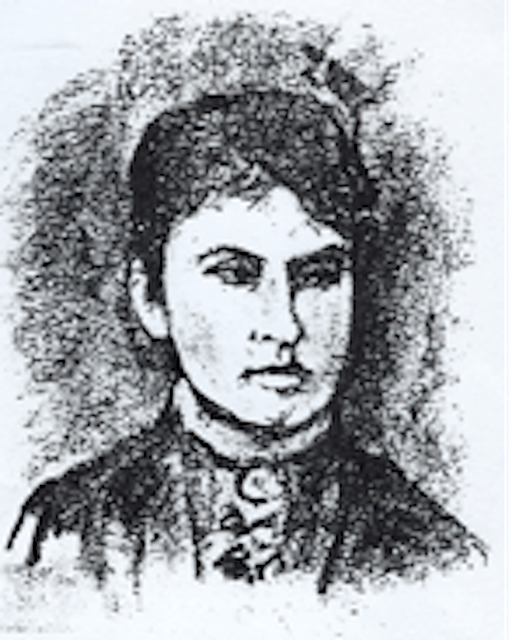
Julia Platt in 1882

Julia Barlow Platt (14 September 1857, in San Francisco – 1935) was an American embryologist, politician and mayor.

== Life ==
Julia Platt received her undergraduate degree from the University of Vermont before moving to the University of Cambridge to perform research at the Harvard Annex in 1887. During her time at Harvard University, she challenged the anti-coeducational policies in place. In 1889, she left Harvard University to take courses and do research at Woods Hole, Clark University, the University of Chicago, Bryn Mawr College, the University of Freiburg, the Naples Zoological Station, and the Ludwig-Maximilians-Universität München. She obtained her doctorate at the University of Freiburg in 1898. She investigated embryogenesis, in particular the head development, from studying sharks and salamanders. Her most notable contribution to the field was her demonstration that neural crest cells formed the jaw cartilage and tooth dentine in Necturus maculosus (mudpuppy embryos), but her work was not believed by her contemporaries. Her claim went counter to the belief that only mesoderm could form bones and cartilage. Her hypothesis of the neural crest origin of the cranial skeleton gained acceptance only some 50 years later when confirmed by Sven Hörstadius and Sven Sellman.

Unable to obtain a doctoral degree from Radcliffe or secure a university position, she said "if I cannot obtain the work I wish, then I must take up with the next best" and then became active in politics, including tearing down a fence to give the public access to the beach at Lover's Point in Pacific Grove, California. In 1931, at the age of 74, she became mayor of Pacific Grove, California. According to Steve Palumbi and Carolyn Sotka, her prescient pioneering setting up of a marine protected area was crucial to the recovery of the sea otter.

== Publications ==
- Platt, J. B. (1890): "The Anterior Head-Cavities of Acanthias (Preliminary Notice)", Zool. Anz. 13: 239
- Platt, J. B. (1892): "Fibres connecting the Central Nervous System and Chorda in Amphioxus", Anat. Anz. 7: 282-284
- Platt, J. B. (1893): "Ectodermic Origin of the Cartilages of the Head", Anat. Anz. 8: 506-509
- Platt, J. B. (1894): "Ontogenetische Differenzirung des Ektoderms in Necturus", Archiv mikr. Anat. 43: 911-966
- Platt, J. B. (1894): "Ontogenetic Differentiations of the Ectoderm in Necturus" Anat. Anz. 9: 51-56
- Platt, J. B. (1898): "The development of the cartilaginous skull and of the branchial and hypoglossal musculature in Necturus", Morphol. Jahrb. 25: 377-464
