= Thomas Albert Work =

American businessman and banker

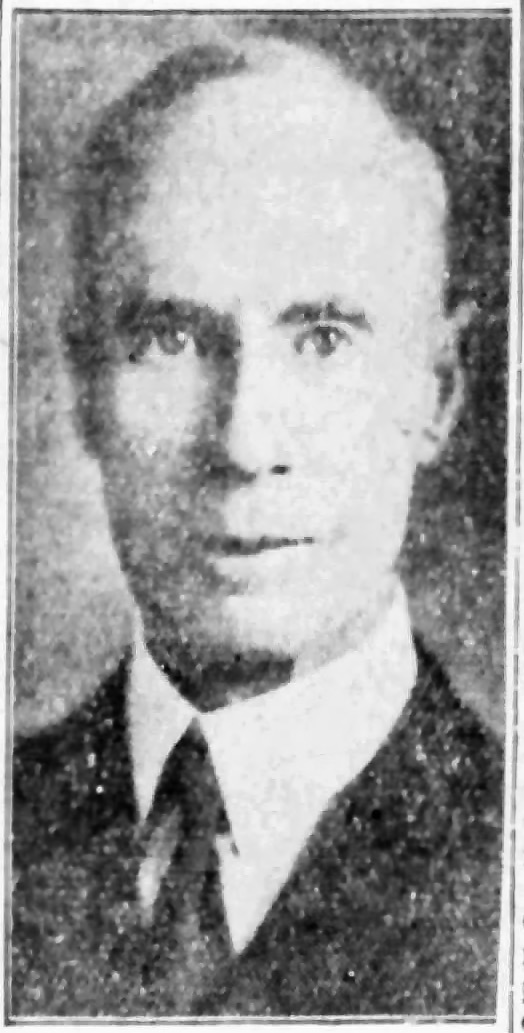
- T. A. Work (1930)
- Born: November 2, 1870; Shetland Islands, Scotland
- Died: 17 April 1963 (aged 92); Monterey County, California, US
- Occupation: Banker
- Spouse(s): Maude Elise Porter; Elinore Coe
- Children: 6

Thomas Albert Work (November 21, 1870 – April 17, 1963) was an American businessman and banker of Pacific Grove, California, known around Monterey as T. A. Work.

== Early life ==
T. A. Work was born in the Shetland Islands, off the coast of Scotland, on November 21, 1870. He was the son of Thomas Albert Work (1833–1894), a minister. In 1883, his brother, already living in Monterey, John Robertson Work (1860–1940), arranged to have T. A. Work live with a family in Monterey He worked for a while delivering milk.

== Career ==
In 1889, T. A. Work was a wholesale and retail dealer in stove wood, hay, grain, ground barley, bran, and flour. He also contracted for street work and furnished gravel in Pacific Grove.

In 1895, Work started the T. A. Work Company, a lumber yard; he had been in the lumber and milling business for 15 years, building sheds and other structures. He built several of the buildings in Monterey County. By 1909, the T. A. Work Company furnished lumber for most of the buildings in Monterey, and built many of the homes in Pacific Grove.

In 1900, Work purchased the First National Bank of Monterey, acquiring it in 1906. He was president of the bank for more than twenty years. He started banks in Carmel, Hollister, Pebble Beach, Seaside, and Salinas. In May 1923, T. A. Work, organized and was elected president of the Bank of Carmel. The Bank of Carmel began with capital stock of $25,000 and with capitalization of $100,000.

== Personal life and death ==
Work married Maude Elise Porter, a teacher, on August 14, 1895.

Later, T. A. Work remarried to Elinore Coe, an Army colonel's widow, and relocated to Pebble Beach.

Work died on April 17, 1963, at the age of 92, in Monterey, California.
