= Hazelfield =

Historic house in West Virginia, United States

- U.S. National Register of Historic Places
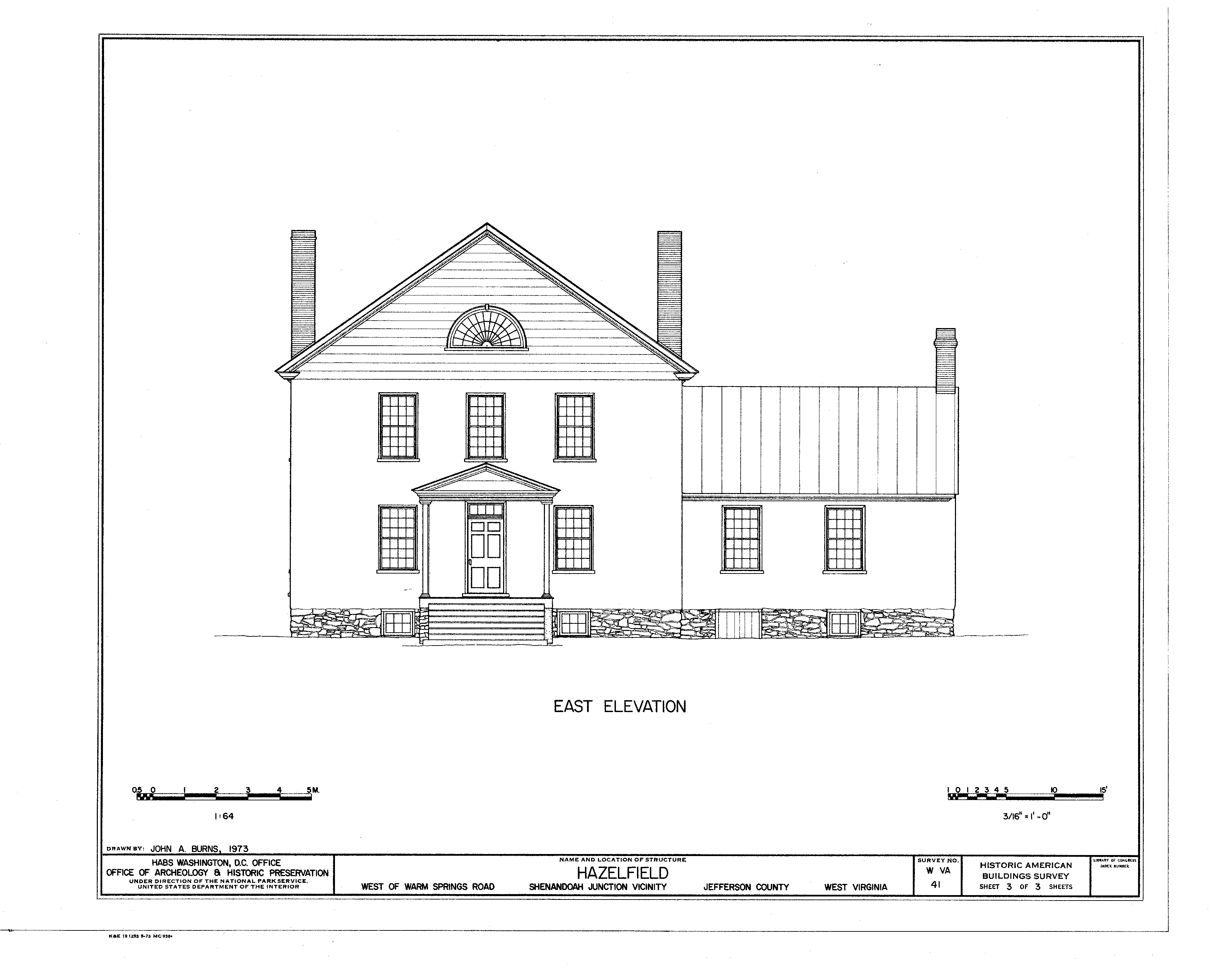

- Location within West Virginia Location within the United States
- Nearest city: Shenandoah Junction, West Virginia
- Coordinates: 39°22′25.73″N 77°51′34.67″W
- Built: 1815
- NRHP reference No.: 76001938
- Added to NRHP: December 12, 1976

Hazelfield, located near Shenandoah Junction, West Virginia is a historic farm, whose principal residence was built in 1815 for Ann Stephen Dandridge Hunter.

== Description ==
The Federal style limestone house is covered with brown stucco, with wood weatherboard gables. The main block is 2 1/2 stories, with a prominent attic lit by a large lunette. A less formal 1 1/2-story side wing is attached to the north side of the main block. The pedimented entrance porch is centered on the east facade. The interior is arranged with a transverse hall plan, the well-lighted hall extending across the width of the front elevation on both main levels, with two rooms to the rear. The U-shaped stairway is at the southeast corner of the hall. Hazelfield is one of the earliest examples of this plan, which was often employed in later houses that were built by the Washington family elsewhere in Jefferson County.

The house rests on a stone basement. The roof is painted metal. The ground floor includes a parlor and dining room in the main section, with a kitchen and pantry in the wing, all but the pantry with fireplaces.

== History ==
The 600-acre (240 ha) Hazelfield estate was given to Ann Stephen by her father, Adam Stephen, on her 1780 marriage to Alexander Spotswood Dandridge, grandson of Virginia colonial lieutenant governor Alexander Spotswood and brother-in-law of Patrick Henry. After Dandridge's death, Ann married Colonel Moses Hunter in 1787. They had three children. After the death of her son David during the War of 1812, Ann moved from Martinsburg to the Hazelfield property and built the Hazelfield house in 1815. On Ann's death in 1834, the property passed to her grandson, David Hunter Tucker, and was used by his brother Nathaniel Beverly Tucker and his wife in the 1840s.

Hazelfield was the first transverse-hall house in Jefferson County, setting a style that became popular in the area. The gable entry arrangement was unusual for a house, since the form was typically reserved for public buildings.

The house had been abandoned by in the early 1970s, when it was purchased by historian William Howard Adams and his wife Janet, and repaired for summer use. Adams believes the house was adapted from the William Adam-designed plan of Milton House in Edinburgh, Scotland

Hazelfield was listed on the National Register of Historic Places on December 12, 1976.
