= Pacific Grove, California =

City in California, United States

- City
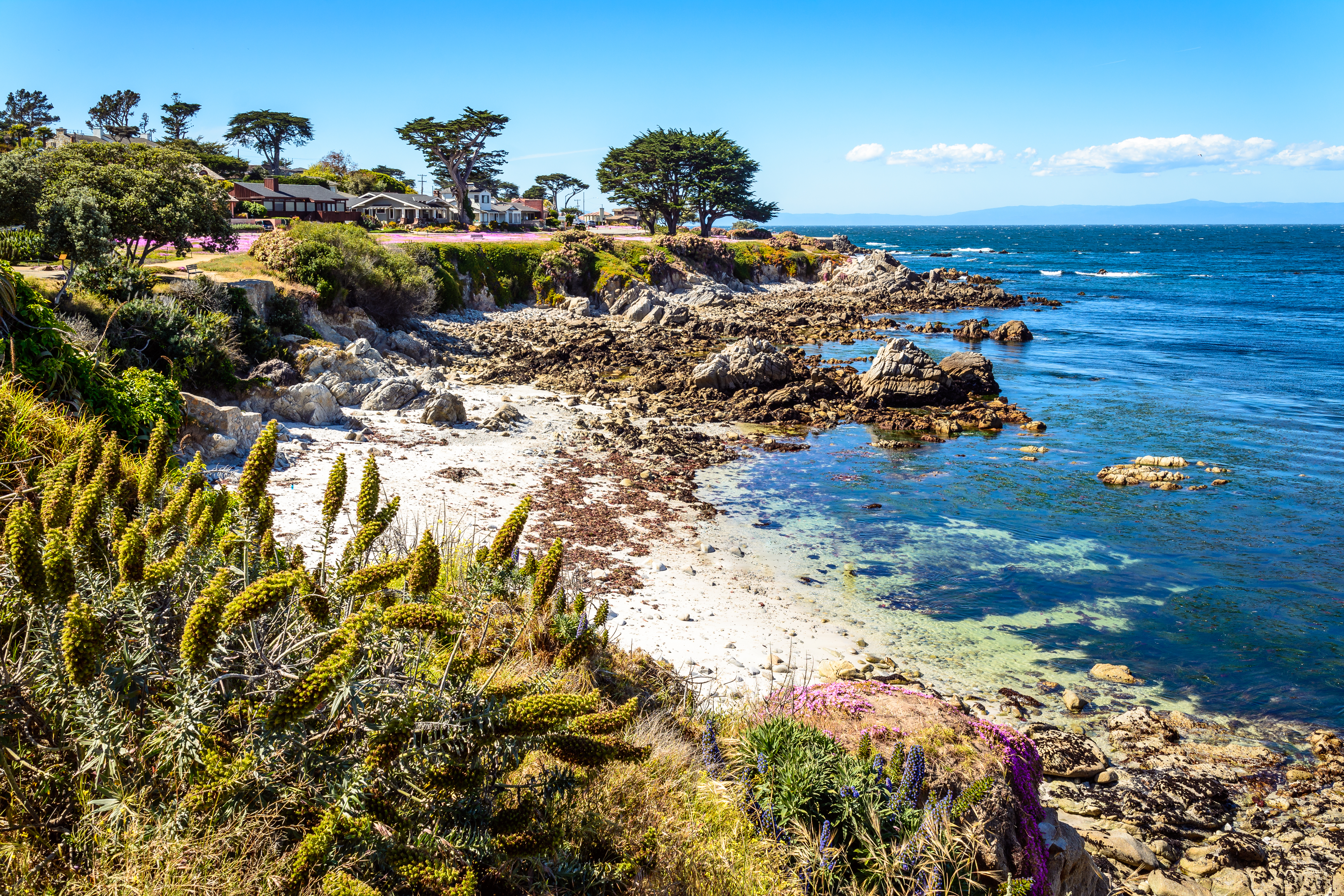
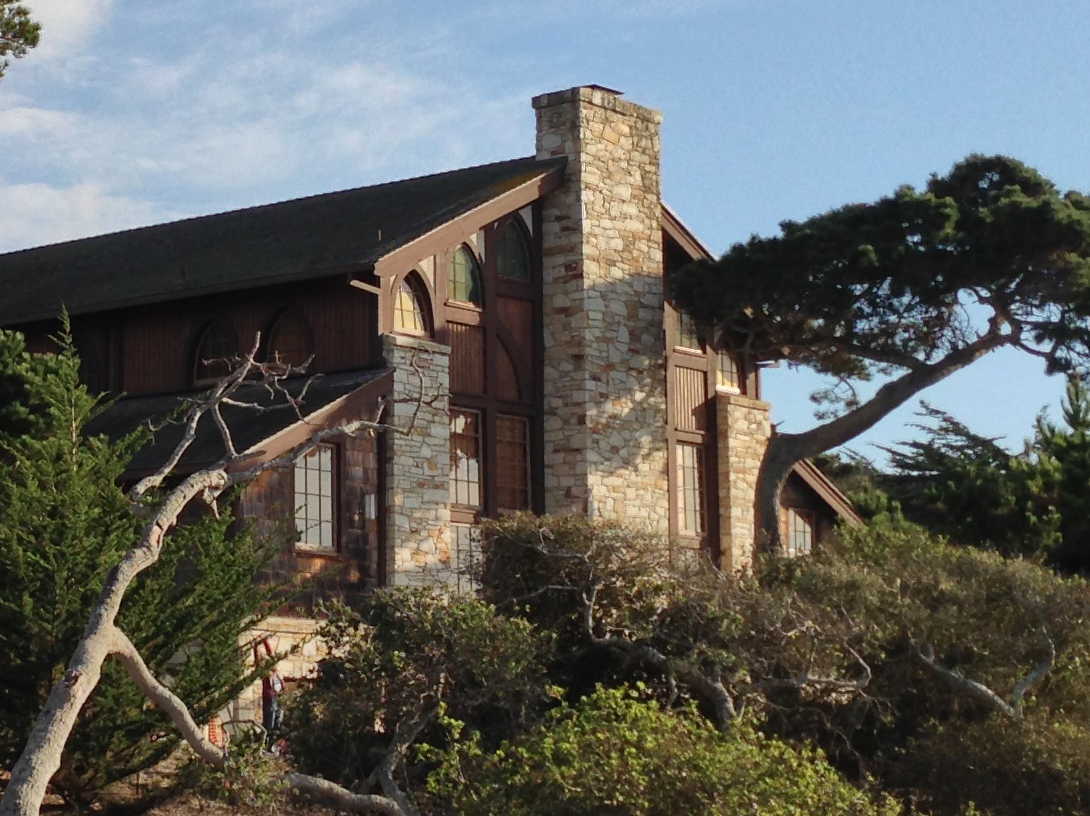
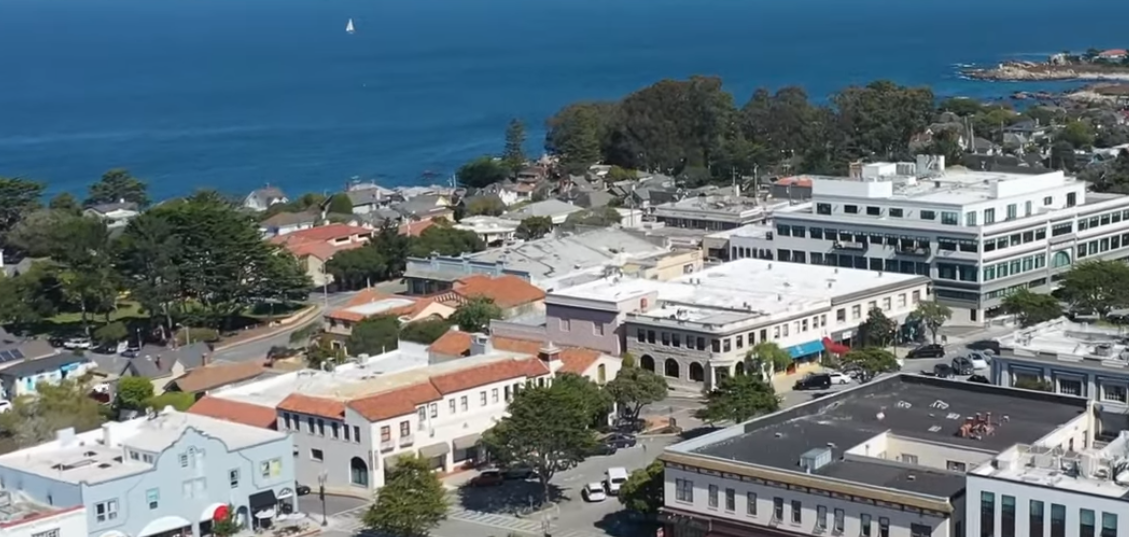
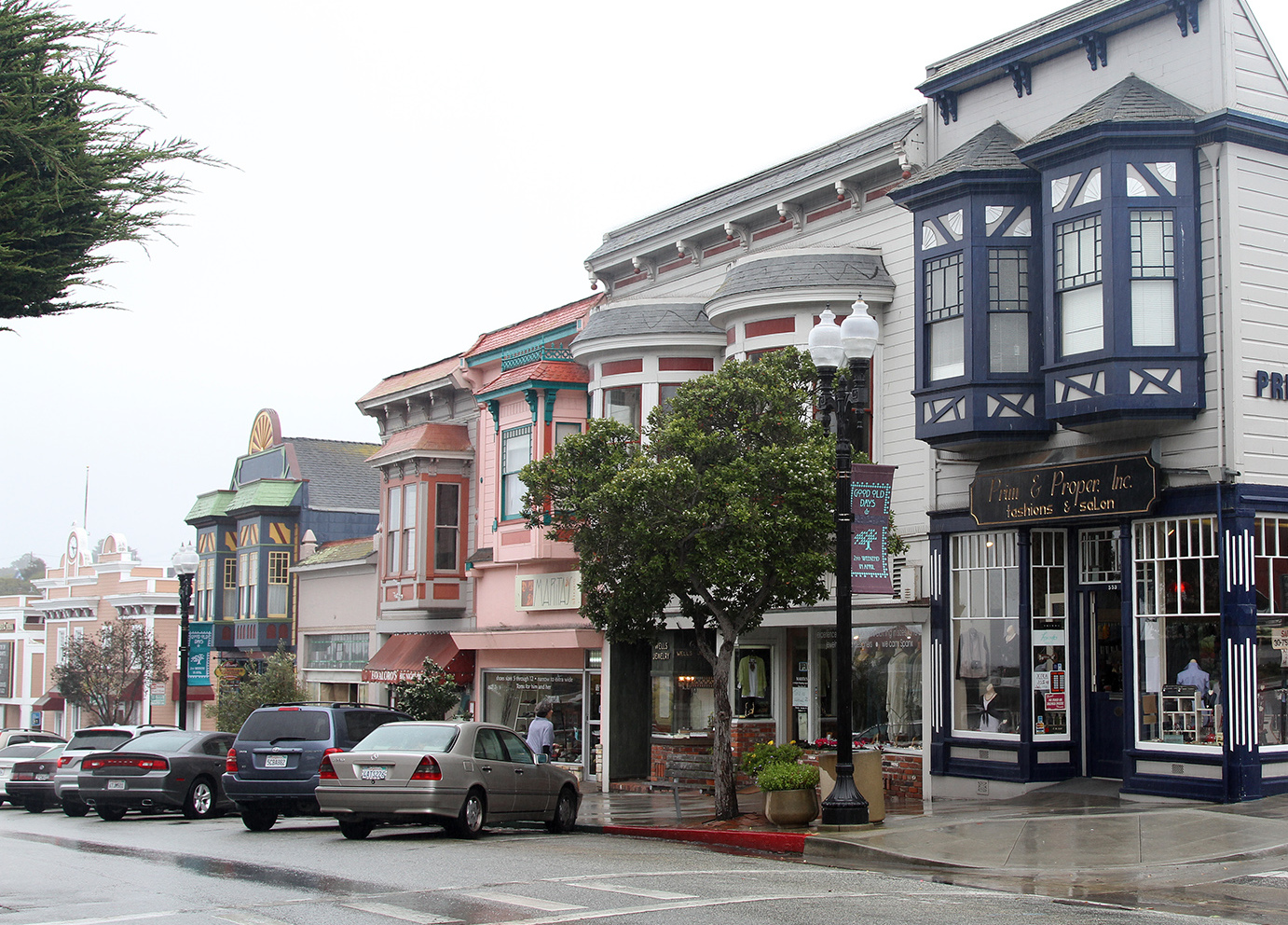
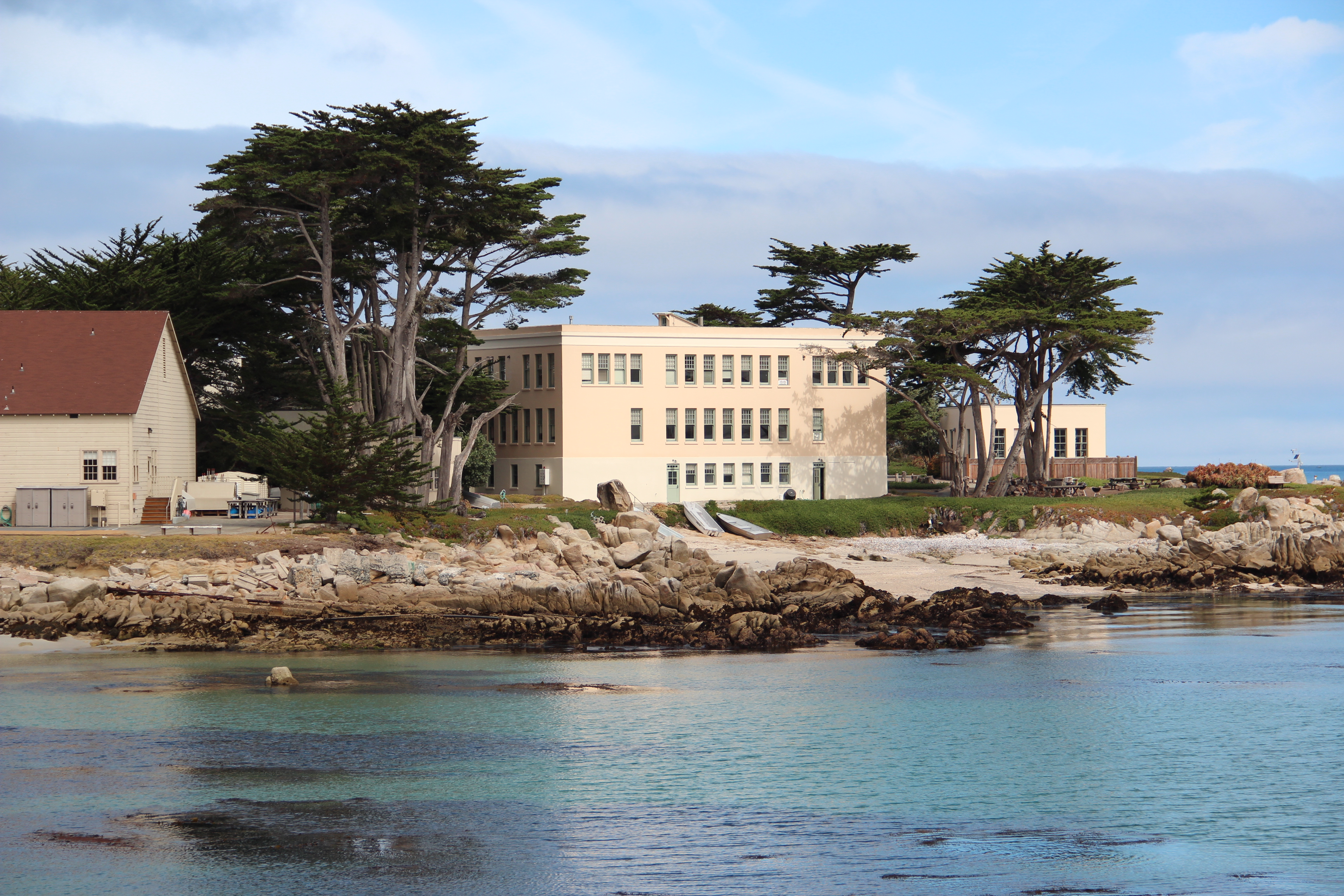
- Top: Perkin's Park (left) and Asilomar (right); center: aerial view of downtown Pacific Grove; bottom: downtown shops (left) and Hopkins Marine Station (right).

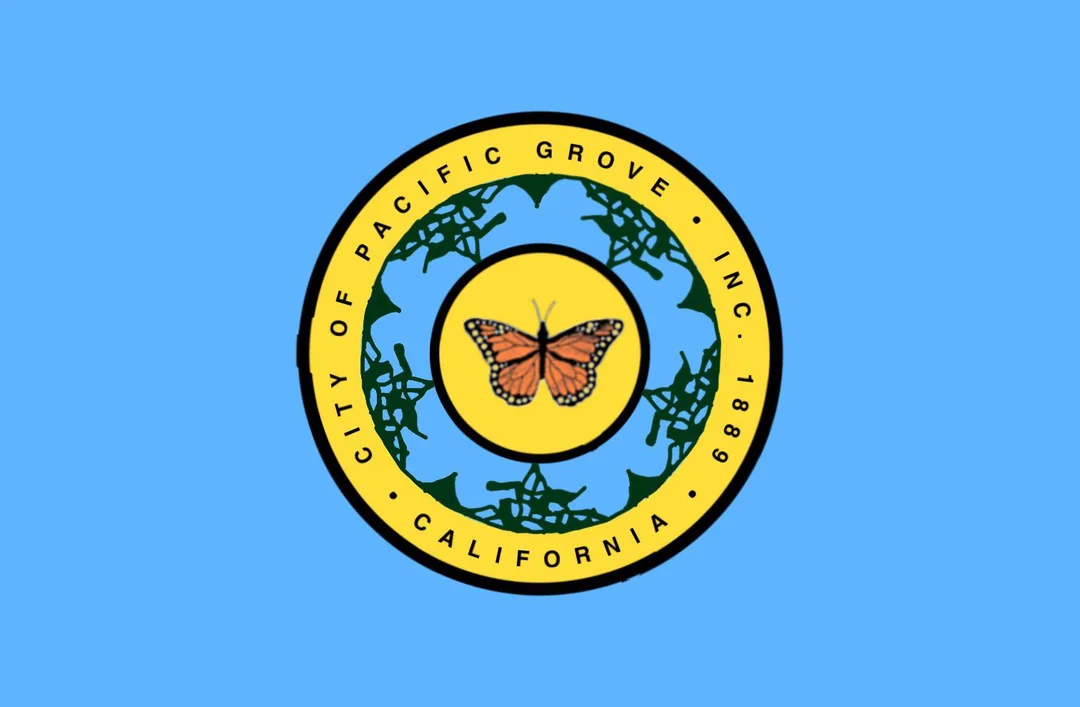
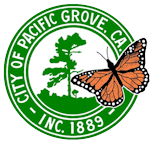
- Flag Seal
- Interactive map of Pacific Grove, California
- Location in the United States
- Coordinates: 36°37′04″N 121°55′00″W
- Country: United States
- State: California
- County: Monterey
- Founded: 1875
- Incorporated: July 5, 1889

Government
  - Type: Council-manager
  - Mayor: Nick Smith
  - State Senator: John Laird (D)
  - Assemblymember: Dawn Addis (D)
  - U. S. Rep.: Jimmy Panetta (D)

Area
  - Total: 4.00 sq mi (10.4 km^{2})
  - Land: 2.87 sq mi (7.4 km^{2})
  - Water: 1.13 sq mi (2.9 km^{2}) 28.28%
- Elevation: 151 ft (46 m)

Population (2020)
  - Total: 15,090
  - Density: 5,257.8/sq mi (2,030.0/km^{2})
- Time zone: UTC-8 (PST)
  - Summer (DST): UTC-7 (PDT)
- ZIP code: 93950
- Area code: 831
- FIPS code: 06-54848
- GNIS feature IDs: 1652821, 2411350
- Website: www.cityofpacificgrove.gov

Pacific Grove is a city situated on the southern edge of Monterey Bay, on the Central Coast of California, United States. Located in Monterey County, the city had a population of 15,090 at the 2020 census. Pacific Grove is a popular tourist destination on the Central Coast, hosting notable attractions the Monarch Grove Sanctuary, Asilomar Conference Center, the Pacific Grove Marine Gardens, and Point Pinos Lighthouse, among others.

The region was historically inhabited by the Rumsen tribe of Ohlone people. During the Mexican era, the area was granted by Governor José Figueroa to local merchant José Abrego as part of Rancho Punta de Piños, in 1833. Following the Mexican-American War and the U.S. conquest of California, the area developed into a notable fishing village. By 1875, the Pacific Improvement Company owned most of the area and founded the modern settlement of Pacific Grove as a Methodist retreat. By the turn of the 19th and 20th centuries, Pacific Grove had come to host a notable art colony, along with the other communities of the Monterey Peninsula.

== History ==
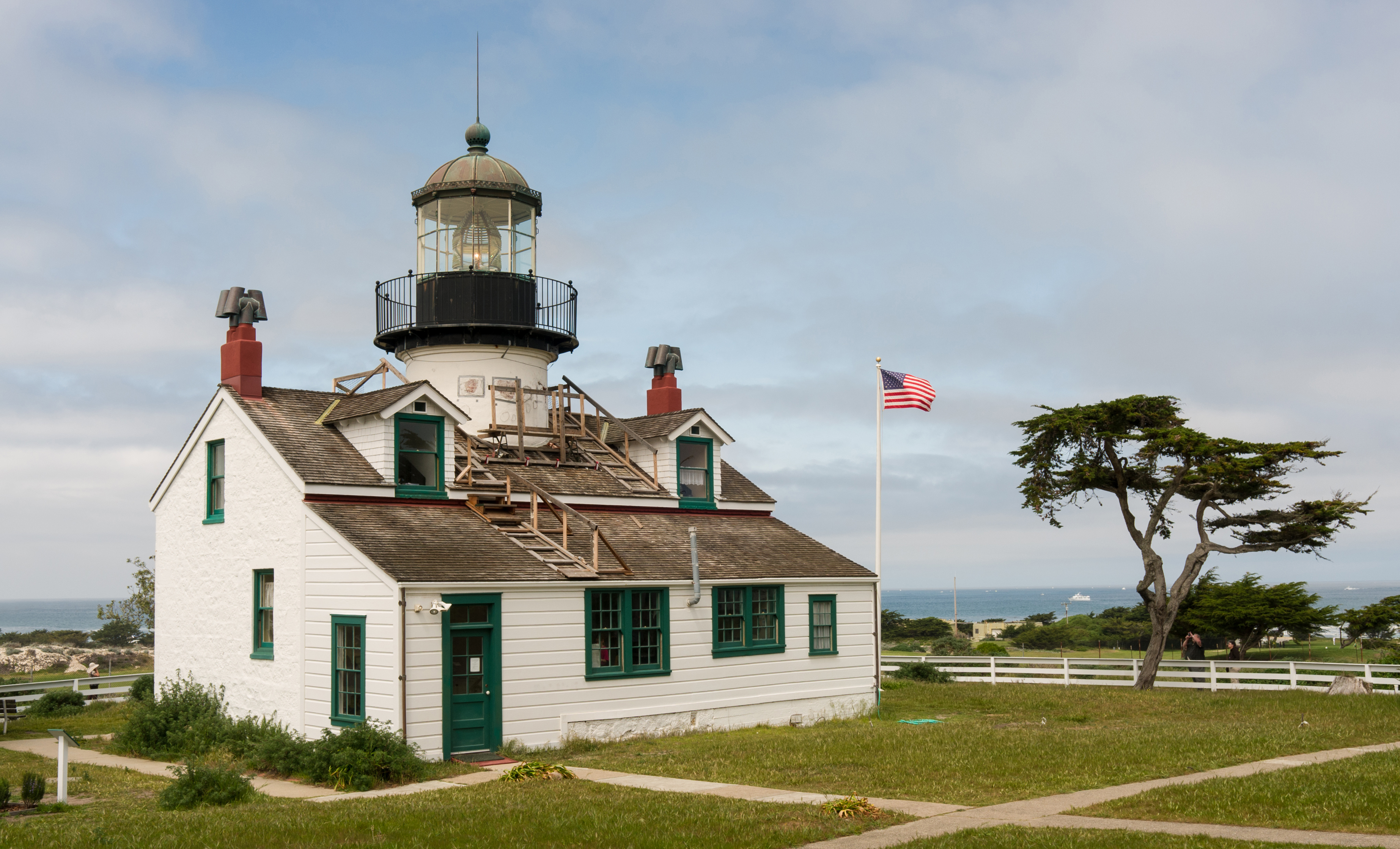
Point Pinos Lighthouse, built in 1855, is the oldest continuously operating lighthouse on the West Coast of the United States.

The first people to inhabit Pacific Grove were members of the Ohlone Rumsen tribe who lived between Big Sur and San Francisco since the 6th century CE. Grinding stones from this tribe still exist in Pacific Grove. The area later became part of the Mexican land grant Rancho Punta de Pinos.

The second group of people to come to Pacific Grove were Chinese immigrants as early as 1853. They established a successful fishing village at Point Alones, an area between Lover's Point and the western edge of Monterey. The Chinese were the first to recognize the potential for commercial fishing in the Monterey Bay. Others quickly saw the benefit, however, and eventually pushed the Chinese from their daytime fishing grounds. Being resourceful, they began fishing for squid in the night, thus beginning California's squid fishery – now one of California's largest fisheries.

By 1859 the property this village sat on belonged to David Jacks (businessman) who owned almost the entire area of the Monterey Peninsula. Jacks sold the property to The Pacific Improvement Company which attempted removal of the Chinese American community in 1905 due to several development interests including Stanford University on which Hopkin's Marine Station now sits. In 1906 there was a fire at the village and during the battle to save the village a firehose was suspiciously cut thereby causing it to completely burn down. The families, without a village to call their own, soon dispersed throughout the region. The first Chinese American born at the village did receive property restitution elsewhere. The loss is memorialized every year in a Walk of Remembrance in mid-May.

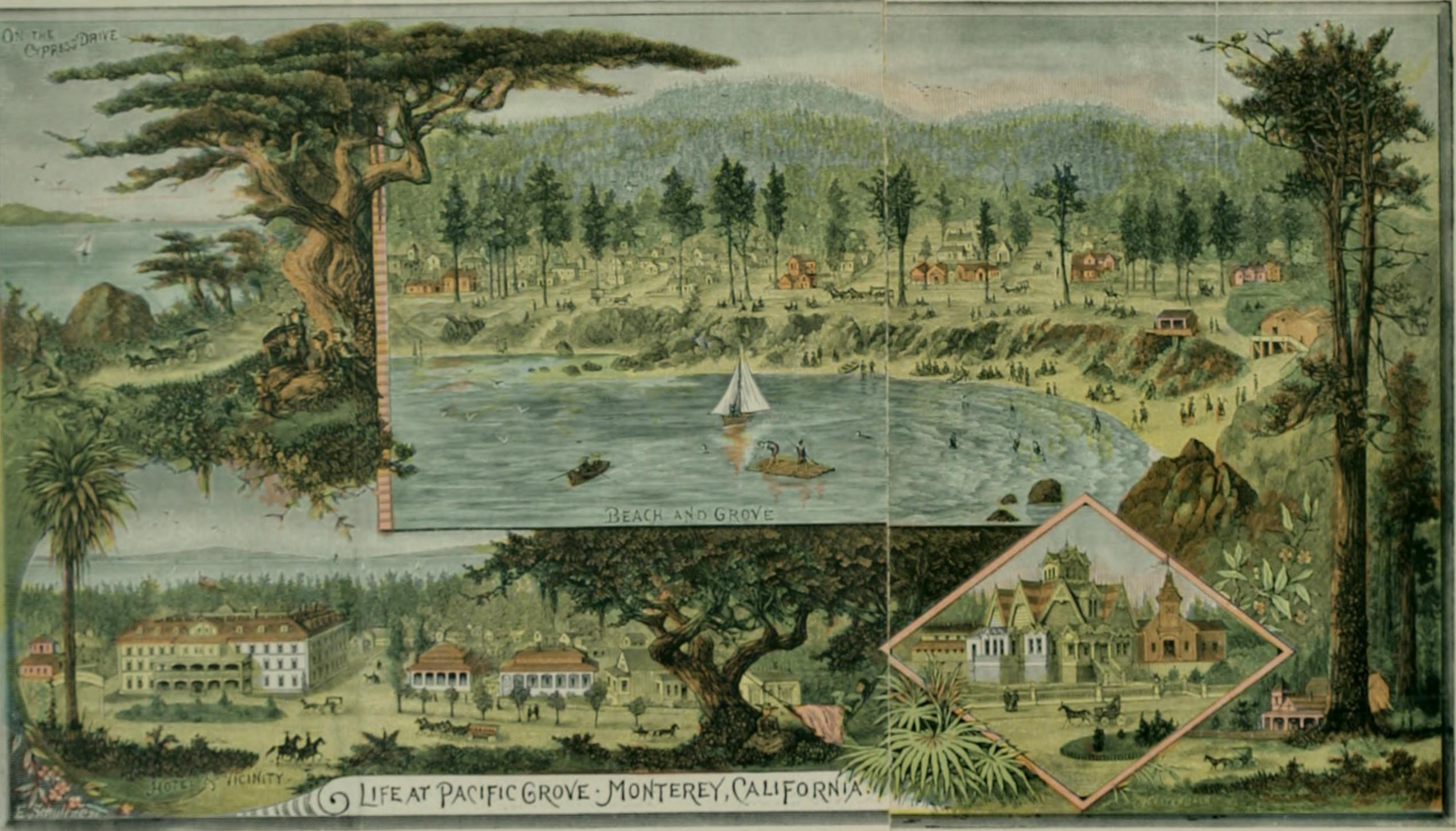
Depiction of Pacific Grove in 1890.

It is notable that not only was the Point Alones fishing village the oldest and longest running fishing village on the West Coast, but also had just as many women as men living there. Even through the years of the national Chinese Exclusion Act there were many positive interactions with the summer Methodist Camp, later to be the town of Pacific Grove. The Methodist women taught English at the village and no doubt fish would have been purchased. Also, a lighted boat parade originally put on by the Chinese fishermen at the closing of the Methodist summer camp was a tradition which continued until a few years ago.

The city of Pacific Grove originated as a Methodist Christian seaside resort. In 1874, Reverend J.W. Ross, a Methodist minister and his wife, visited the area and decided it would be an ideal location for a proposed Methodist Retreat. The pine, oak and cypress trees, along with many varieties of wild plants and flowers, made Pacific Grove an attractive place for camping. On June 1, 1875, the Pacific Grove Retreat Association was formed in San Francisco to administer the Christian Seaside Resort in Pacific Grove. The Pacific Improvement Company (which later became Del Monte Properties) and David Jacks provided the land for the Retreat area. This Retreat Area, as surveyed at that time by St. John Cox, covers the area from the Bay up to Lighthouse Avenue and from First Street to Pacific Avenue.

In November 1879, after the summer campers returned home, Robert Louis Stevenson wandered into the deserted campgrounds: "I have never been in any place so dreamlike. Indeed, it was not so much like a deserted town as like a scene upon the stage by daylight, and with no one on the boards."

The Pacific Grove post office opened in 1886, closed later that year, and was reopened in 1887. Pacific Grove incorporated in 1889.

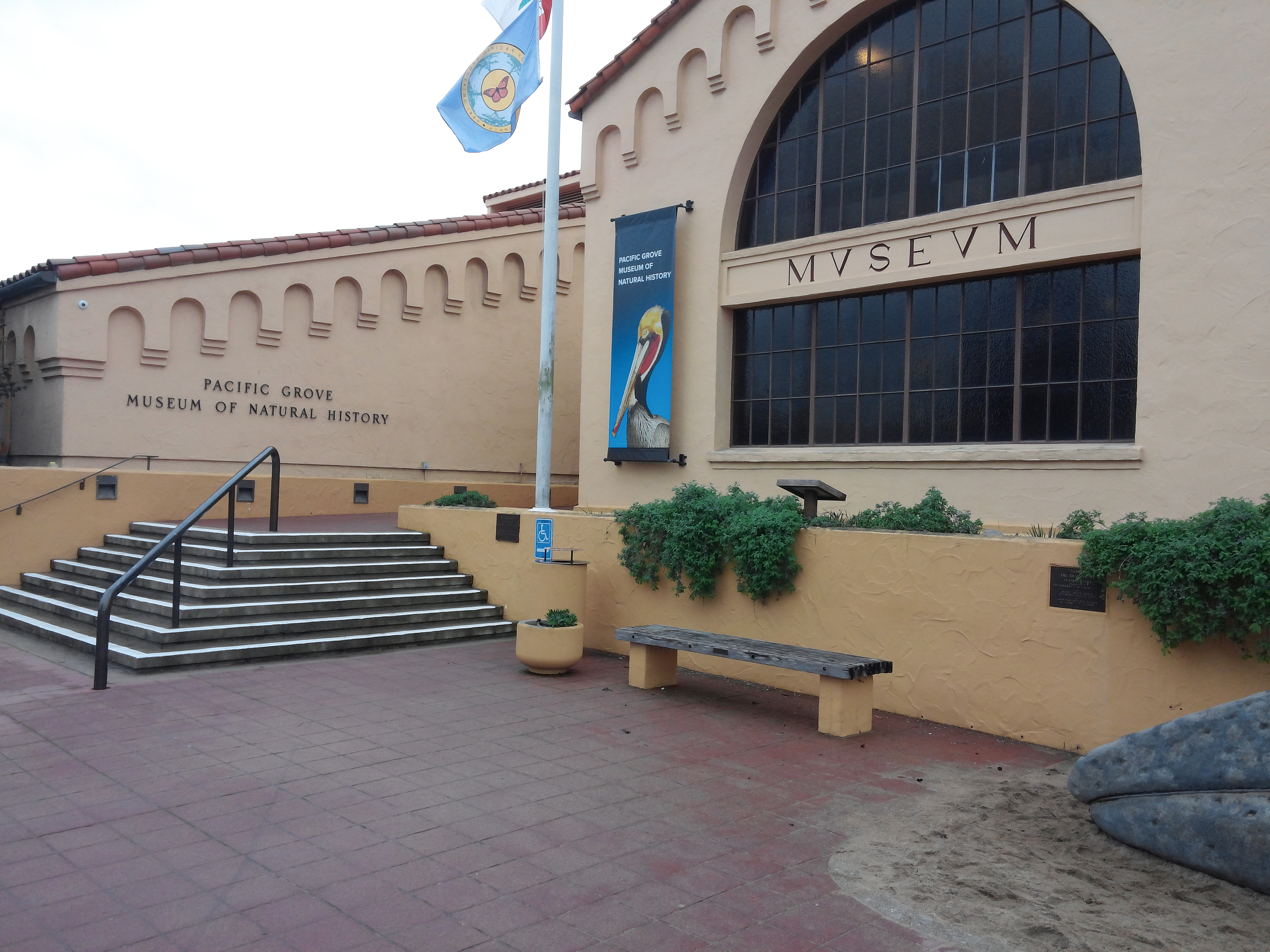
The Pacific Grove Museum of Natural History was founded in 1883.

The El Carmelo Hotel was Pacific Grove's first hotel, opening to guests on May 20, 1887. It was sometimes called the sister of Monterey's Hotel Del Monte. It was located on Lighthouse Avenue between Fountain and Grand avenues and owned by the Pacific Improvement Company (PIC). In 1907, the name changed to the Pacific Grove Hotel. In 1917, the PIC decided to dismantle it and use the wood in the reconstruction of The Lodge at Pebble Beach that had burned down on December 17, 1917. The empty block was sold to W. R. Holman in 1919 to open the Holman Department Store.

Thomas Albert Work built several of the buildings in Pacific Grove, including the three-story Del Mar hotel in 1895, at the corner of Sixteenth, and in 1904 he built a commercial block along Lighthouse Avenue to house local businesses, including the two-story Romanesque-style Bank of Pacific Grove.

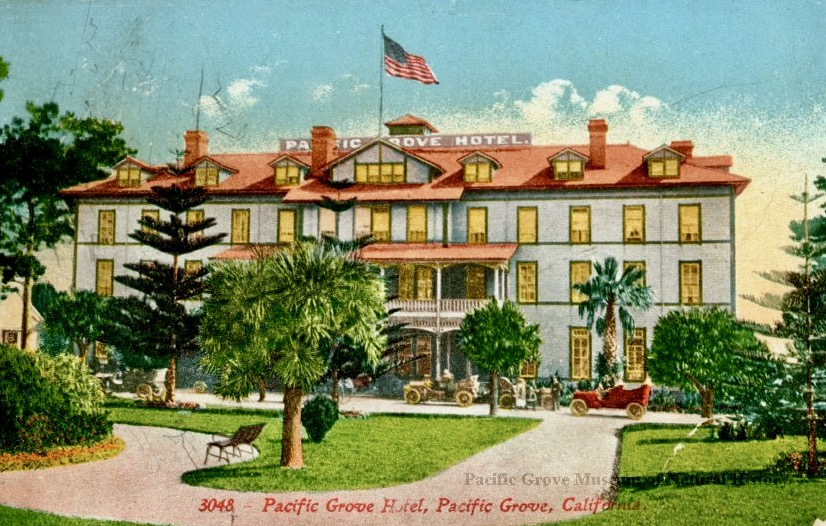
El Carmelo Hotel, built in 1887, was Pacific Grove's first hotel.

Pacific Grove, like Carmel-by-the-Sea and Monterey, became an artists' haven in the 1890s and subsequent period. Artists of the En plein air school in both Europe and the United States were seeking an outdoor venue with natural beauty, and Pacific Grove became a magnet for this movement. William Adam was an English painter who first moved to Monterey and then decided on Pacific Grove for his home in 1906. At about the same time, Eugen Neuhaus, a German painter, arrived in Pacific Grove with his new bride. Charles B. Judson was an artist of aristocratic lineage who painted in Pacific Grove over a long time beginning in 1907; Judson's murals decorate the halls of the California Academy of Sciences in San Francisco.

The Asilomar Conference Grounds are located at the western edge of Pacific Grove. Asilomar opened in 1913 as a YWCA summer retreat; it now belongs to the California State Park System. Thirteen buildings on these grounds were designed by architect Julia Morgan, who also designed Hearst Castle.

Taken together, the construction of Holman's Department Store, the Grove Theater, and the Forest Hill Hotel embodied the vibrant optimism of the 1920s. During this era, Pacific Grove witnessed a growing accessibility to automobile tourists and a rising population of year-round residents. Additionally, two of these structures exemplify significant architectural trends of the period, as both the Grove Theater and Forest Hill Hotel feature elements influenced by Spanish-style design. This stylistic shift was echoed in other commercial buildings as well, including the transformation of the Hotel Del Mar. Around the same period, it underwent remodeling to adopt the Mediterranean Revival style, marked by stucco cladding and distinctive red tile embellishments.

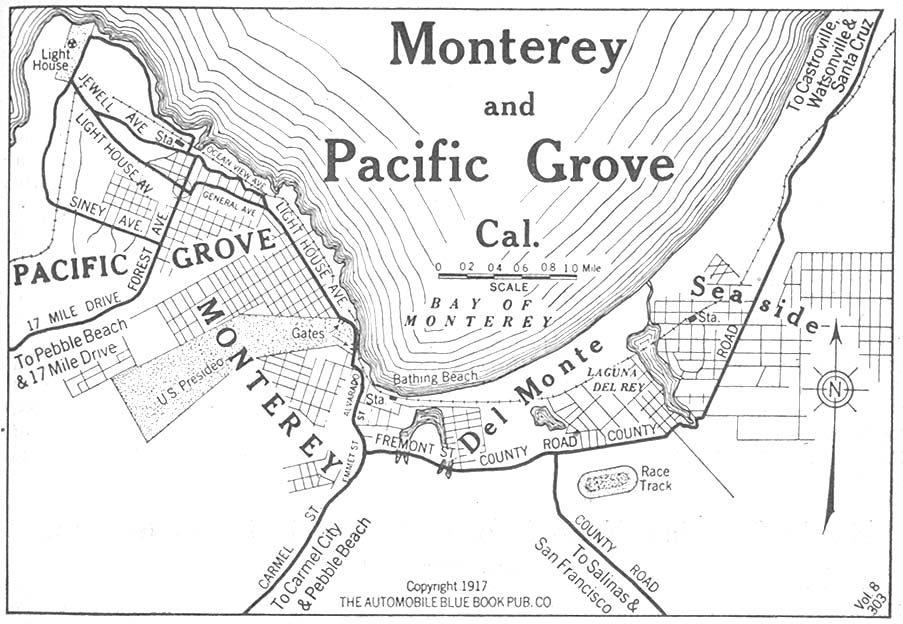
Map of Pacific Grove and the southern Monterey Bay, 1917.

For a number of years, John Steinbeck lived in a cottage in Pacific Grove owned by his father, Ernest, who was Monterey County treasurer. The cottage still stands on a quiet side street at 147 11th Street, without any plaque or special sign, virtually overlooked by most Steinbeck fans. Another Steinbeck-related house is at 222 Central Avenue, which was his grandmother's house. A golden statue of Steinbeck in the front yard stood for years before it was removed. In Steinbeck's book Sweet Thursday, a chapter is dedicated to describing a (probably fictional) rivalry that arose among the town's residents over the game of roque.

Local traditions include a Butterfly Parade held in early October to celebrate the return of the monarch butterfly to its wintering habitat. Mid-April, a Good Old Days festival is held downtown, which includes rides, crafts booths, food, entertainment, and a parade. On the last Saturday of July there is a pet parade. Candy Cane Lane is a neighborhood of Morse Drive and Platt Park that is decorated for Christmas each December with an abundance of lights and decorations. Candy Cane Lane has been a local tradition for more than 60 years.

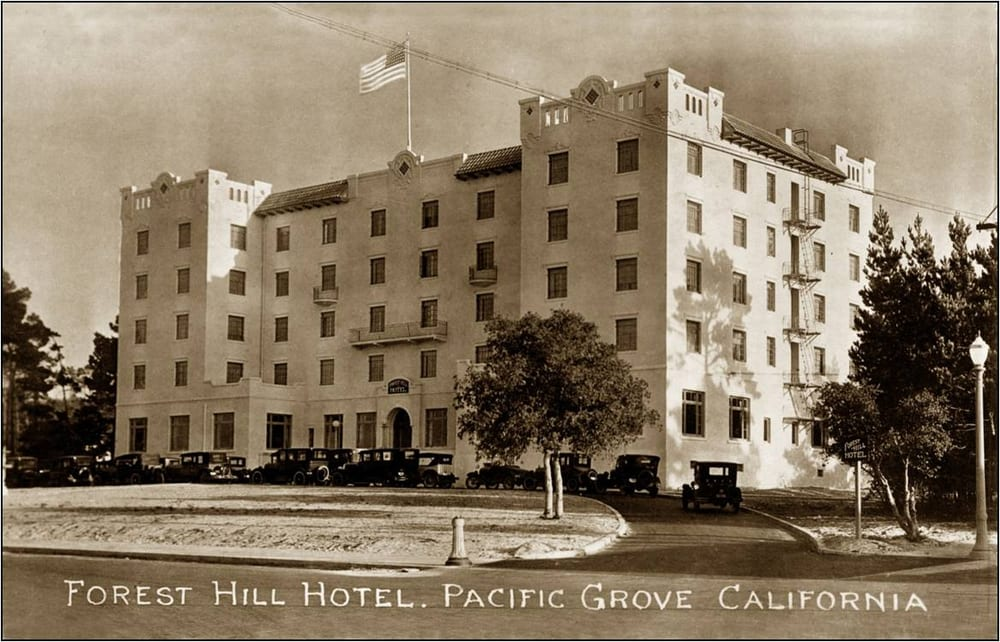
The Mission Revival style Forest Hill Hotel in 1923.

Hopkins Marine Station maintains a campus next to the Monterey Bay Aquarium. It was founded in 1892, originally at the site of Lover's Point, making it the oldest marine laboratory on the US Pacific Coast, and the third-oldest in the US. Created after the Marine Biological Laboratory in Woods Hole, Massachusetts. It was originally named the Hopkins Seaside Laboratory, and was located on what is now Lovers Point. It was relocated to its current site at Point Alones.

In the 1980s, Pacific Grove was the site of the pioneering microcomputer software company Digital Research. Originally located in Gary Kildall's house on the corner of Lighthouse and Willow, it later moved to offices on Central Avenue.

On October 12, 1997, John Denver died when he crashed into the Pacific Ocean off Pacific Grove in his personal plane.

Pacific Grove was the last dry town in California. Due to the city's religious and gated history, alcohol was not served to the public until July 4, 1969, at the grand opening of the Pacific Grove Art Center by ElMarie Dyke, its founder. This caused much controversy because the law was not to take effect until November of that year. Ironically, ElMarie was also a great proponent for keeping the town dry. To this day, Pacific Grove has very strict laws regarding the service of alcohol and has no stand-alone bars.

At the November 6, 2018, general municipal election, Pacific Grove voters approved Measure M, which prohibits short-term vacation rentals in residential districts outside the Coastal Zone.

== Geography and ecology ==
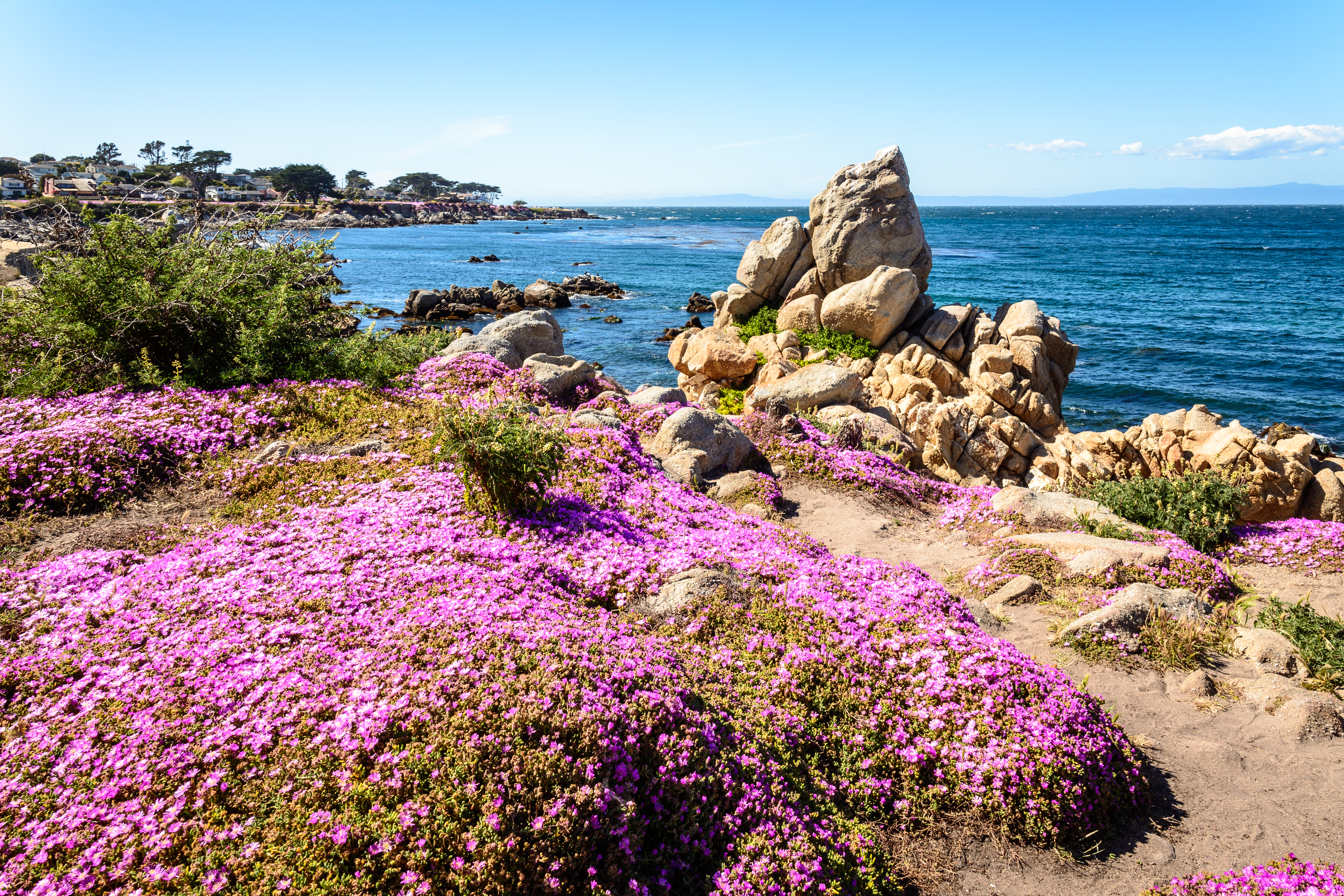
Drosanthemum floribundum growing by the coast at Perkins Park.

Pacific Grove contains several habitat types, including marine, littoral, pine forest, and mixed-oak woodland. The famed breeding habitat for the monarch butterfly, the Monarch Grove Sanctuary, is situated in the northwest part of town imbedded in residential neighborhoods in mixed oak forests. These monarchs migrate 1,200 miles (1,900 kilometers) to reach Pacific Grove after their summer in the Rocky Mountains, often soaring as high as 3,000 meters (9,800 ft).

The black-and-orange monarch butterflies spend much of the fall and winter in Monterey pine and eucalyptus trees, roughly from the autumnal equinox through the spring (or vernal) equinox. Most butterflies are protected in the city's Butterfly Sanctuary. There is a fine of $1000 for molesting or interfering with monarch butterflies within the city during their annual migratory visit, except under defined circumstances.

Additionally, a Scientific Collecting Permit (SCP) is required to handle wild monarchs in California including for educational purposes. It is unlawful to collect, remove from the wild and/or captively rear monarchs in that state without an SCP. Nevertheless, the construction of a motel among the butterfly trees at Pacific Grove to accommodate visitors destroyed a famous monarch overwintering site.

On December 12, 2024, the U.S. Fish and Wildlife Service published in the Federal Register a proposed rule that would list the monarch butterfly as a threatened species and would designate the butterfly's critical habitat per the provisions of the Endangered Species Act. The proposed rule designated seven areas near California's Pacific coast as "critical habitat units" for monarch butterflies. The Pacific Grove Monarch Butterfly Sanctuary is within one these units.

Pacific Grove Marine Gardens State Marine Conservation Area, Lovers Point State Marine Reserve, Edward F. Ricketts State Marine Conservation Area and Asilomar State Marine Reserve are marine protected areas in the waters around Pacific Grove. Like underwater parks, these marine protected areas help conserve ocean wildlife and marine ecosystems. Monterey Bay is a marine protected sanctuary.

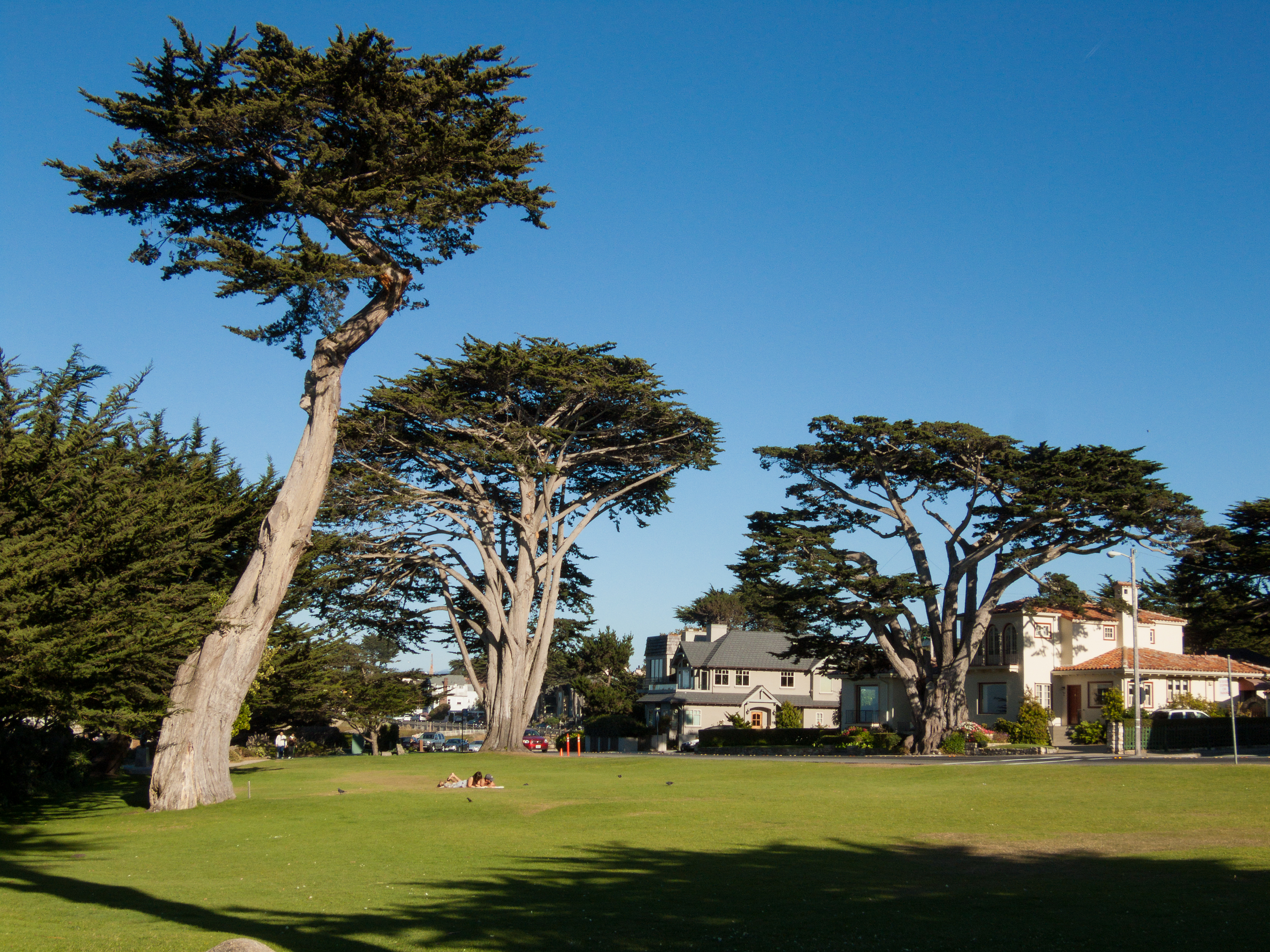
Berwick Park

The principal noise source in Pacific Grove is State Route 68. There are approximately 800 residents exposed to sound levels of 60 CNEL or above, making Pacific Grove noticeably quieter than its neighbor Monterey, which has more tourist traffic and more through traffic.

The town sits between its two well known neighbors, Pebble Beach and Monterey. Carmel-by-the-Sea is the next city, 5 mi (8 km) south, and the community of Big Sur is 30 mi (50 km) south. Pacific Grove is a favorite vacation getaway for San Francisco Bay Area residents, as it is located two hours south of San Francisco.

The town does not allow development on the waterside of the ocean-front street, so that the beaches and scenic points are unobstructed.

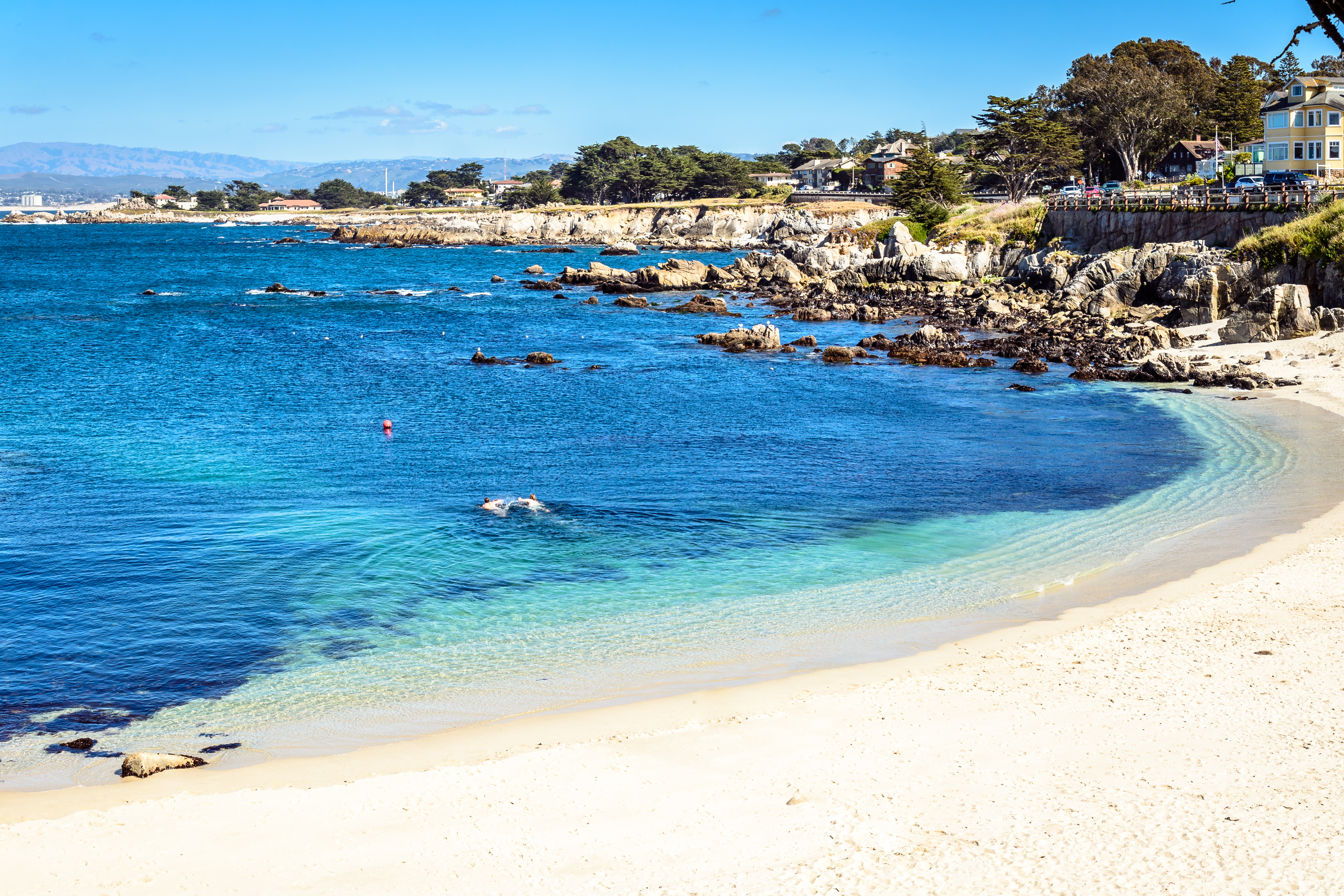
Lover's Point Beach.

Pacific Grove is on the Pacific Ocean coast between Monterey and Pebble Beach, about 40 mi (65 km) south of Santa Cruz and about 120 mi (195 km) south of San Francisco. According to the United States Census Bureau, the city has a total area of 4.0 square miles (10 km^{2}), and about 2.9 sq mi (7.5 km^{2}) are land and 1.1 sq mi (2.8 km^{2}) (28.28%) are covered by water. Asilomar, Lovers Point, and the intervening coastline afford surfing, which is challenging due to near-shore rocks, albeit waves are typically moderate in height.

=== Climate ===
Owing to its coastal location, Pacific Grove's climate is mild and fairly consistent throughout the year, essentially the same as in neighboring Monterey, with most of the rain falling from November through April. Extreme temperatures are rare, and fog is common, especially in the late night and early morning, all year.

This region experiences warm and dry summers, with no average monthly temperatures above 71.6 °F (22.0 °C). According to the Köppen climate classification, Pacific Grove has a warm-summer Mediterranean climate, Csb on climate maps.

Climate data for Pacific Grove, California
Month	Jan	Feb	Mar	Apr	May	Jun	Jul	Aug	Sep	Oct	Nov	Dec	Year
Record high °F (°C)	90 (32)	86 (30)	88 (31)	93 (34)	95 (35)	100 (38)	98 (37)	96 (36)	104 (40)	104 (40)	95 (35)	89 (32)	104 (40)
Mean daily maximum °F (°C)	58.5 (14.7)	59.6 (15.3)	60.2 (15.7)	61.3 (16.3)	62.9 (17.2)	65.4 (18.6)	66.5 (19.2)	67.9 (19.9)	68.7 (20.4)	67.0 (19.4)	62.3 (16.8)	58.7 (14.8)	63.3 (17.4)
Mean daily minimum °F (°C)	42.7 (5.9)	44.5 (6.9)	45.5 (7.5)	46.8 (8.2)	49.3 (9.6)	51.5 (10.8)	53.2 (11.8)	53.9 (12.2)	53.0 (11.7)	50.2 (10.1)	46.2 (7.9)	42.6 (5.9)	48.3 (9.1)
Record low °F (°C)	20 (−7)	22 (−6)	32 (0)	35 (2)	35 (2)	41 (5)	43 (6)	45 (7)	45 (7)	41 (5)	30 (−1)	20 (−7)	20 (−7)
Average precipitation inches (mm)	3.55 (90)	3.14 (80)	3.17 (81)	1.24 (31)	0.42 (11)	0.16 (4.1)	0.08 (2.0)	0.11 (2.8)	0.24 (6.1)	0.91 (23)	2.15 (55)	2.32 (59)	17.49 (444)

== Government ==
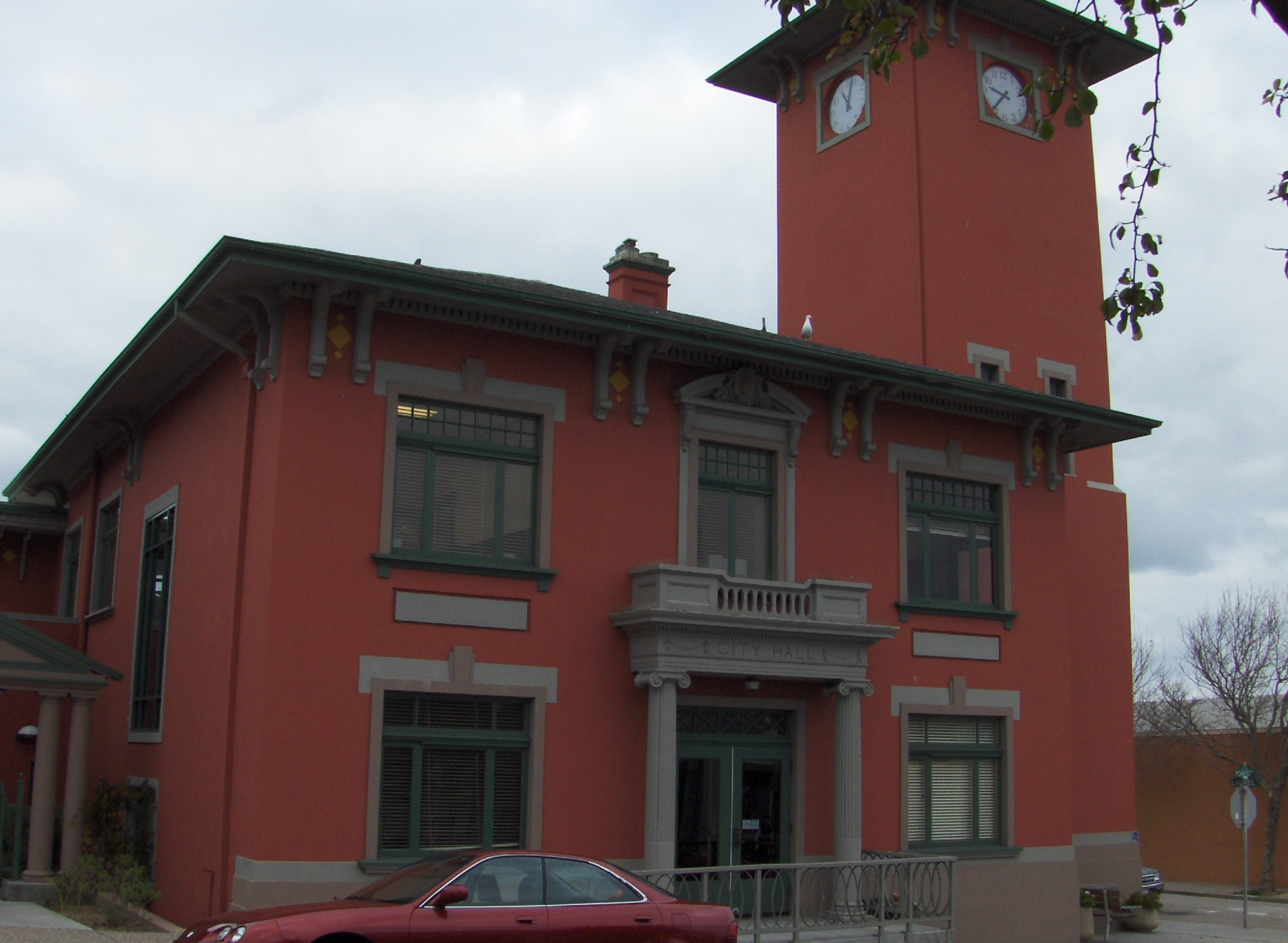
Pacific Grove City Hall, built in 1912 and designed by W. H. Weeks.

Pacific Grove is governed by a city council consisting of a mayor and six councilmembers, all elected at-large. As of 2025, the mayor is Nick Smith, and the six councilmembers are: Joe Amelio, Lori McDonnell, Chaps Poduri, Tina Rau, Paul Walkingstick, and Cynthia Garfield.

At the county level, Pacific Grove is represented on the Monterey County Board of Supervisors by Kate Daniels.

In the California State Assembly, Pacific Grove is represented by Dawn Addis as part of the 30th Assembly district. In the California State Senate, it is represented by John Laird as part of the 17th Senate district.

In the United States House of Representatives, Pacific Grove is in California's 19th congressional district, represented by Democrat Jimmy Panetta.

== Demographics ==
Historical population
Census	Pop.	Note	%±
1890	1,336		—
1900	1,411		5.6%
1910	2,384		69.0%
1920	2,974		24.7%
1930	5,558		86.9%
1940	6,249		12.4%
1950	9,623		54.0%
1960	12,121		26.0%
1970	13,505		11.4%
1980	15,755		16.7%
1990	16,117		2.3%
2000	15,522		−3.7%
2010	15,041		−3.1%
2020	15,090		0.3%
U.S. Decennial Census

=== 2020 census ===
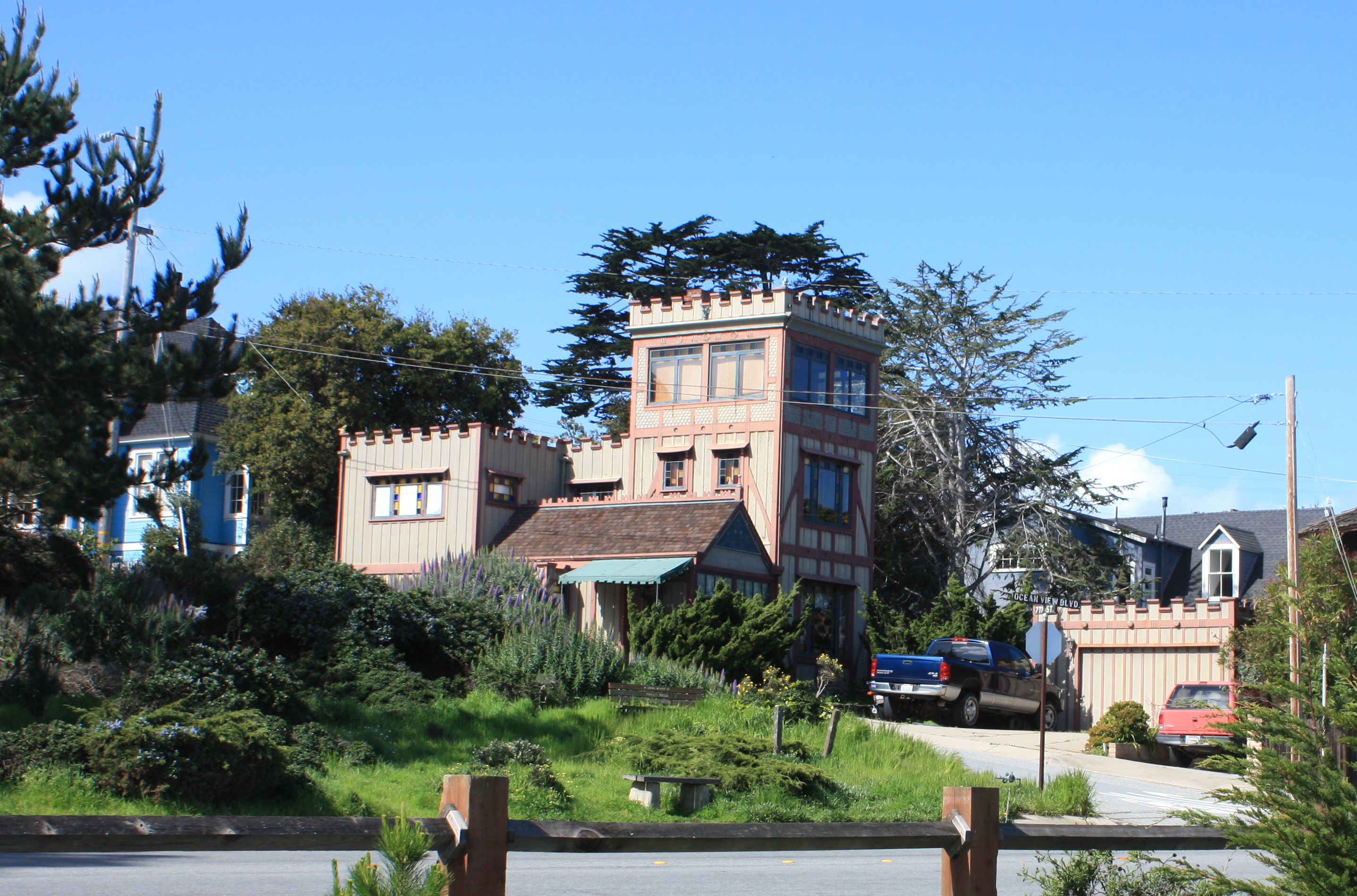
Homes in Pacific Grove.

As of the 2020 census, Pacific Grove had a population of 15,090. The population density was 5,265.2 inhabitants per square mile (2,032.9/km^{2}).

The census reported that 97.5% of the population lived in households, 0.7% lived in non-institutionalized group quarters, and 1.8% were institutionalized. In addition, 100.0% of residents lived in urban areas, while 0.0% lived in rural areas.

The age distribution was 17.6% under the age of 18, 5.7% aged 18 to 24, 21.8% aged 25 to 44, 26.2% aged 45 to 64, and 28.7% who were 65 years of age or older. The median age was 49.2 years. For every 100 females, there were 87.2 males, and for every 100 females age 18 and over there were 84.4 males.

There were 6,772 households, of which 23.7% had children under the age of 18 living in them. Of all households, 45.0% were married-couple households, 5.4% were cohabiting-couple households, 31.8% had a female householder with no spouse or partner present, and 17.8% had a male householder with no spouse or partner present. About 34.3% of households were one person, and 17.8% were one person aged 65 or older. The average household size was 2.17. There were 3,949 families (58.3% of all households).

There were 8,121 housing units at an average density of 2,833.6 units per square mile (1,094.1 units/km^{2}), of which 6,772 (83.4%) were occupied and 16.6% were vacant. Of the occupied units, 47.6% were owner-occupied and 52.4% were occupied by renters. The homeowner vacancy rate was 0.9%, and the rental vacancy rate was 7.1%.

Racial composition as of the 2020 census
Race	Number	Percent
White	11,168	74.0%
Black or African American	170	1.1%
American Indian and Alaska Native	105	0.7%
Asian	1,017	6.7%
Native Hawaiian and Other Pacific Islander	37	0.2%
Some other race	693	4.6%
Two or more races	1,900	12.6%
Hispanic or Latino (of any race)	2,146	14.2%

=== 2023 ACS 5-year estimates ===
In 2023, the US Census Bureau estimated that 13.1% of the population were foreign-born. Of all people aged 5 or older, 83.2% spoke only English at home, 6.1% spoke Spanish, 5.0% spoke other Indo-European languages, 3.9% spoke Asian or Pacific Islander languages, and 1.9% spoke other languages. Of those aged 25 or older, 96.5% were high school graduates and 58.5% had a bachelor's degree.

The median household income in 2023 was $105,568, and the per capita income was $66,784. About 3.9% of families and 7.1% of the population were below the poverty line.

=== 2010 census ===
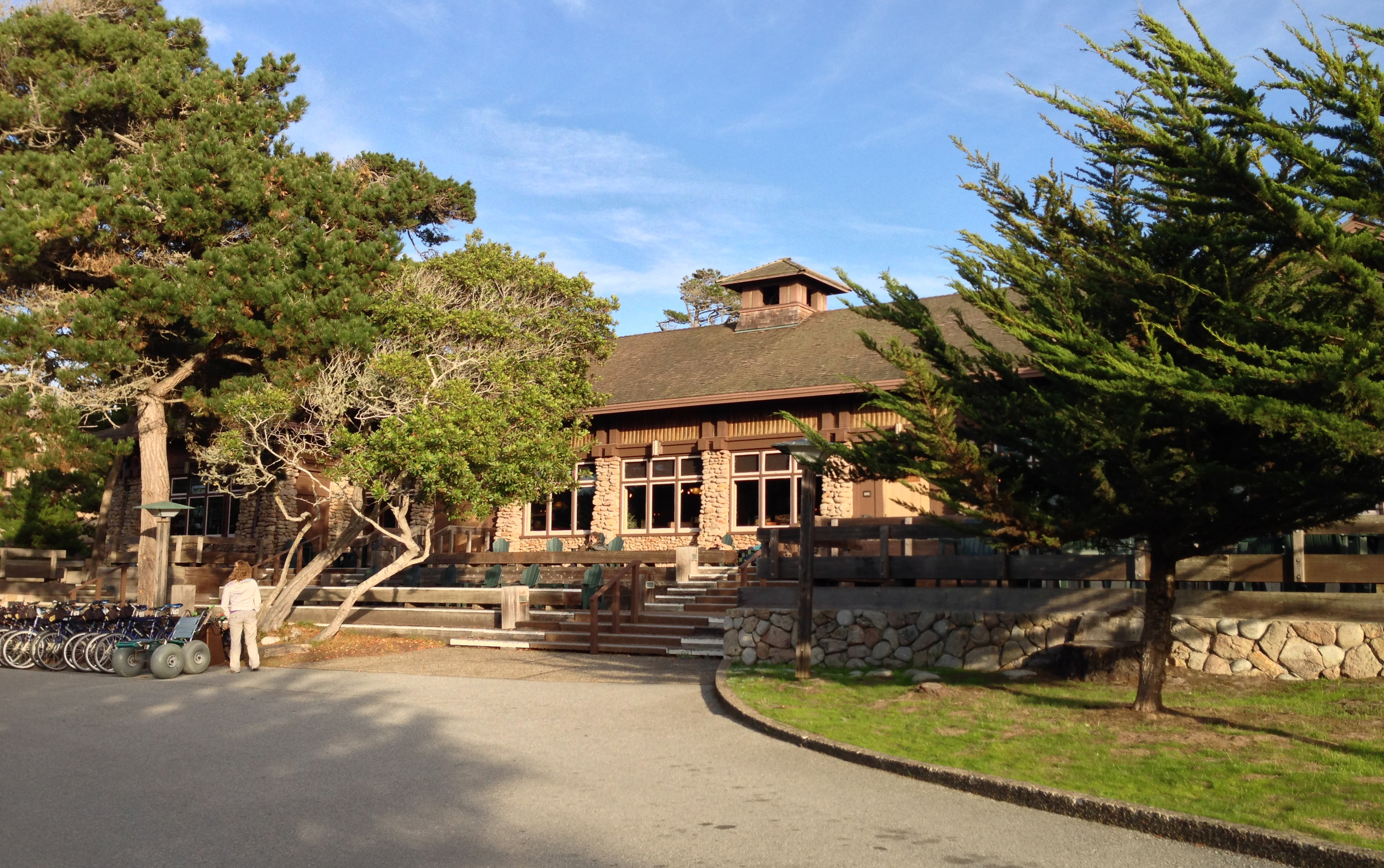
Asilomar Conference Grounds.

The 2010 United States census reported that Pacific Grove had a population of 15,041. The population density was 3,758.1 people/mi^{2} (1,451.0 people/km^{2}). The racial makeup of Pacific Grove was 84.5% White, 1.3% African American, 0.5% Native American, 5.8% Asian, 0.3% Pacific Islander, 3.1% from other races, and 4.4% from two or more races. Hispanics or Latinos of any race were 10.7% of the population.

The Census reported that 14,686 people (97.6% of the population) lived in households, 140 (0.9%) lived in noninstitutionalized group quarters, and 215 (1.4%) were institutionalized.

Of the 7,020 households, 21.7% had children under the age of 18 living in them, 41.8% were married couples living together, 9.3% had a female householder with no husband present, 3.3% had a male householder with no wife present. About 5.0% were unmarried opposite-sex partnerships, and 0.8% were same-sex married couples or partnerships. About 37.2% were made up of individuals, and 14.4%had someone living alone who was 65 or older. The average household size was 2.09; the average family size was 2.74.

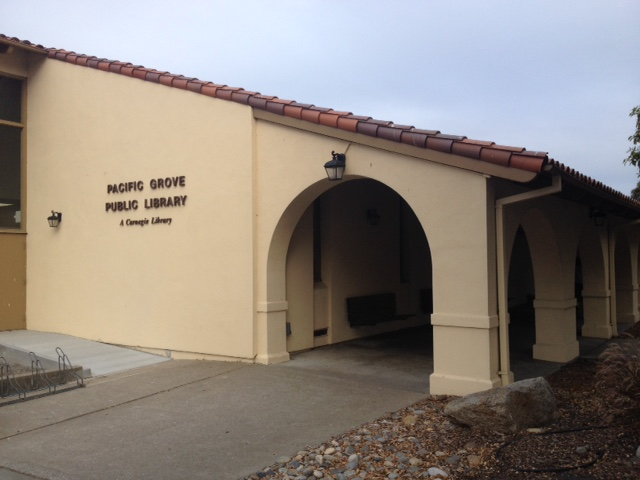
Pacific Grove Library

In the city, the age distribution was 16.5% under 18, 6.6% from 18 to 24, 23.0% from 25 to 44, 32.3% from 45 to 64, and 21.6% who were 65 or older. The median age was 48.1 years. For every 100 females, there were 85.2 males. For every 100 females age 18 and over, there were 81.1 males.

The 8,169 housing units averaged 2,041.1 units per square mile (788.1 units/km^{2}), of which 3,205 (45.7%) were owner-occupied, and 3,815 (54.3%) were occupied by renters. The homeowner vacancy rate was 3.8%; the rental vacancy rate was 4.4%. 7,071 people (47.0% of the population) lived in owner-occupied housing units and 7,615 people (50.6%) lived in rental housing units.

Over 1300 structures were listed on the town's historic register, giving Pacific Grove the largest number of historic homes and structures for its size on the West Coast.

== Media ==
Local radio station KAZU-FM - 90.3 was created by Don Mussel in 1977 in Pacific Grove, but is now located in Seaside, California. Television service for the community comes from the Monterey-Salinas-Santa Cruz designated market area. Local newspapers include The Monterey County Herald and the Monterey County Weekly.

== Notable people ==
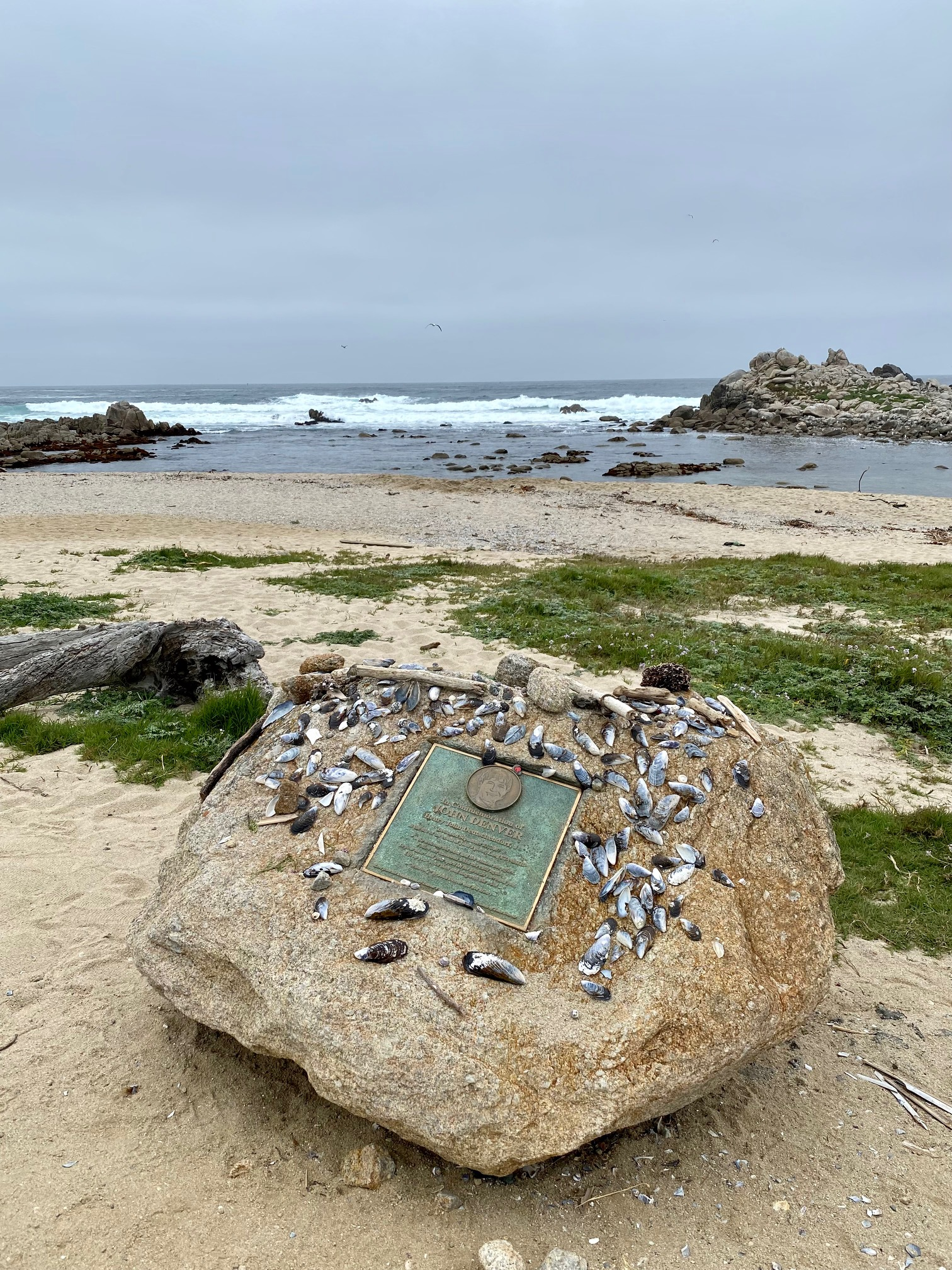
John Denver Memorial

- Isabella Abbott, educator
- William Adam, artist
- Bruce Ariss, painter
- Alice Bailey, theosopher, writer
- Lawrence Rogers Blinks, biologist
- Ernest K. Bramblett, politician
- Sam Buttrey, Game-show contestant
- Samuel Bolton Colburn, painter
- Tom Craft, football coach
- Peter S. Fischer, writer
- Anne Hadden, librarian
- Sean Halton, MLB player
- Steve Hauk, writer, gallery owner
- Ben Jealous, NAACP president (2008–2013)
- Gary Kildall, scientist and founder of Digital Research
- George Mattos, pole vaulter
- M. Evelyn McCormick, painter
- Ward Moore, science fiction writer
- Julia Platt, mayor
- Arthur Porges, science-fiction writer
- Ed Ricketts, marine biologist
- Clark Ashton Smith, writer
- John Steinbeck, author
- Chauncey Thomas Jr., rear admiral
- Bill Walsh, football coach
- Thomas Albert Work, banker
- Gina Prince-Bythewood, film director, screenwriter

== See also ==
- Coastal California
- List of school districts in Monterey County, California
- List of tourist attractions in Monterey County, California
- Pacific Grove High School
