= El Carmelo Hotel =

Historic Hotel

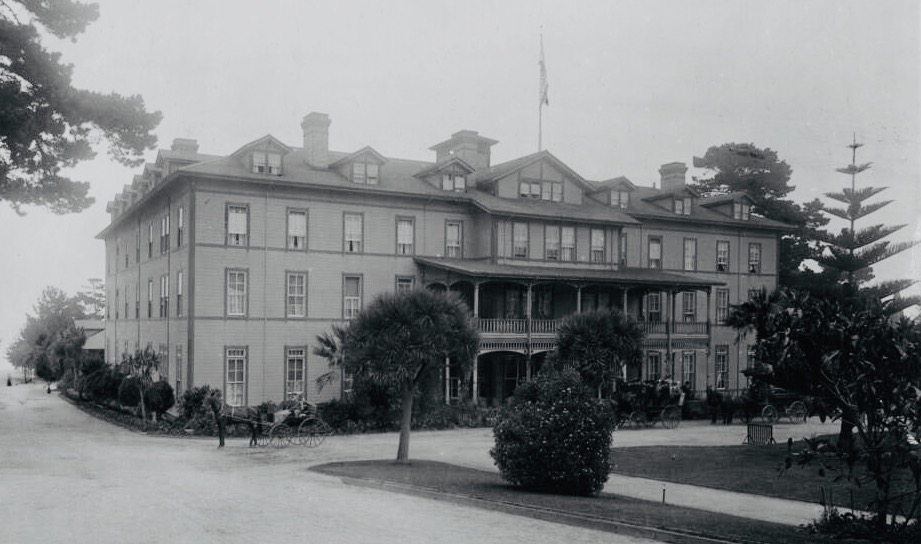
- El Carmelo Hotel (c. 1890)
- Interactive map of the El Carmelo Hotel area

General information
- Location: Pacific Grove, California, Lighthouse Avenue between Fountain and Grand Avenues
- Coordinates: 36°37′4″N 121°55′0″W
- Opening: 1887
- Management: Pacific Improvement Company (PIC)

Technical details
- Floor count: 3

Other information
- Number of rooms: 114
- Number of restaurants: 1

El Carmelo Hotel was Pacific Grove's first hotel, opened to guests on May 20, 1887. It was sometimes called the sister of the Hotel Del Monte. It was located on Lighthouse Avenue between Fountain and Grand Avenues, Pacific Grove and owned by the Pacific Improvement Company (PIC). In 1907, the name of the hotel changed to the Pacific Grove Hotel. In 1917, the PIC decided to dismantle it and use the wood in the reconstruction of The Lodge at Pebble Beach, California that had burned down on December 17, 1917. The empty block was sold to W. R. Holman in 1919 to open the Holman Department Store.

== History ==
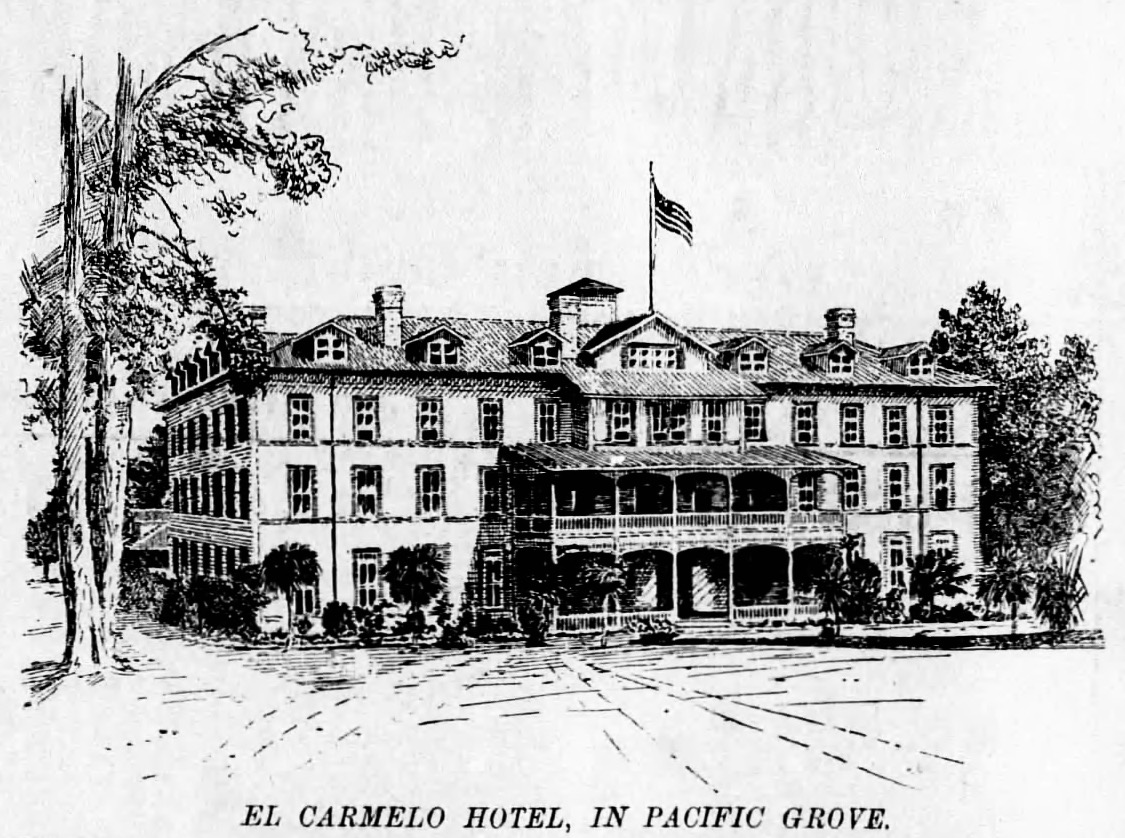
El Carmelo Hotel in Pacific Grove, California

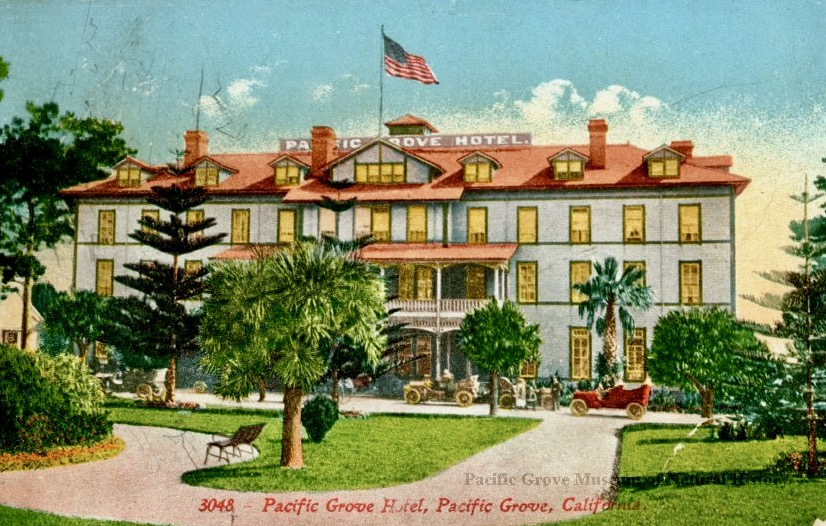
Pacific Grove Hotel, Pacific Grove, California

The Carmelo hotel was built by the Pacific Improvement Company (PIC) in 1887 soon after the Hotel Del Monte was destroyed by fire on April 1, 1887. The building was three stories high and included an attic. It contained 114 rooms, an elevator, and an attached large restaurant and dining room. It included six cottages that were across the street on Grand Avenue, built in 1883. The hotel's water was provided by the Carmel River. It had its own power plan and used gas lights manufactured on the premises. Rooms were advertised at $2 a day and $10 to $12 per week. It could accommodate up to 185 guests. Hotel guests could share the use of the Hotel Del Monte's golf course and other privileges.

El Carmelo comes from the Spanish name, El Rio de Carmelo, given to the Carmel River by Spanish explorer Sebastián Vizcaíno shortly before he landed in Monterey Bay in December 1602.

In June 1893, the El Carmelo hotel was renovated for the summer season. The hotel was directly across a park (now Jewell Park), had front gardens, tennis courts, and park benches. In addition, PIC provided tents to rent at $2.25 a week and a camping ground for $1 a week. Lectures at the Chautauqua Hall in Pacific Grove were on the arranged program of events near the hotel.

In April 1907, after twenty years, the hotel's name was changed to the Pacific Grove Hotel. The name was changed to avoid confusion with the Hotel Carmelo and to advertise the town of Pacific Grove.

== See also ==
- List of hotels in the United States
