= Samuel Bolton Colburn =

American artist (1909–1993)

Samuel Bolton Colburn (1909 Denver, Colorado – 1993, Pacific Grove, California) was an experimental artist, evolving a modernist approach to landscape and genre scenes during the Depression era. In the 1930s California became known nationally for its Regionalist painters like Colburn, who depicted urban and rural views of native life. These artists’ preferred medium was watercolor and they worked quickly outdoors on location developing a painting style that was spontaneous, gestural and raw.

While most American Regionalists worked in a realistic manner, Colburn liked to experiment with the lessons of modernism. Like the East Coast modernist John Marin, who was a major influence on the artist, Colburn continually searched for a direct freedom of expression. The San Francisco critic Alfred Frankenstein credited Colburn with a sense of drama and "as fine an eye for the subtleties of watercolor as this country has produced since Marin’s heyday"”

Colburn grew up in Glendale and Long Beach and studied geology at the University of Southern California. After graduating in 1932 he spent a year in Europe traveling and studying art. Upon his return to Los Angeles, he studied with Don Graham at Chouinard Art Institute. In 1937 he moved to Carmel, where he became a member of the Carmel Art Association three years later

The Monterey Peninsula provided the perfect cultural climate for the development of Colburn's art. At the time, the prominent artists Armin Hansen, William Ritschel, Paul Whitman, August Gay, and Louis Siegriest were present in the area and provided valuable friendship and advice; the writer John Steinbeck, poet Robinson Jeffers and photographers Edward Weston and Ansel Adams were also close friends. Salvador Dalí, who lived in Pebble Beach during the 1940s, attracted other important European modernists to the area including Fernand Léger, with whom Colburn studied in 1941. Colburn's portrait of Jeffers is on the cover of the 1963 Vintage paperback edition of Robinson Jeffers: Selected Poems.

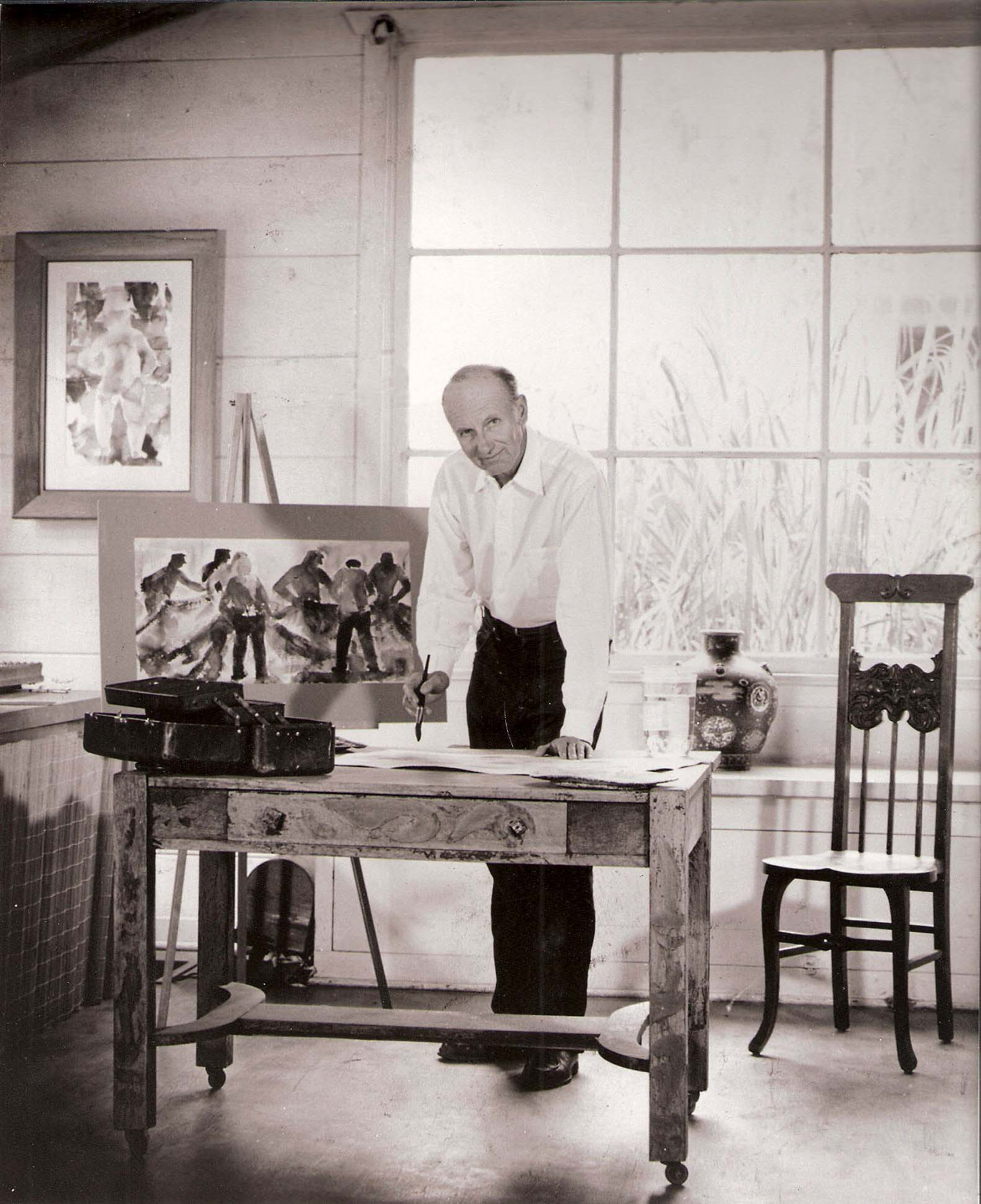
Sam at work in his Carmel, California, home studio in 1962

For many years, Colburn lived in Carmel, in a large house which was a center for local bohemian activity, playing his violin during late night drinking parties and living mainly off an inheritance, which eventually gave out. Later he lived in a sheltered cabin called Stag's Retreat in the beachside Asilomar woods, across from the last remaining sand dunes in the area. Something of a local legend on the Peninsula for his acerbic wit and eccentric character, Colburn was an active member of the artistic community, teaching, writing art criticism for the Carmel Pine Cone, executing public murals, and exhibiting in galleries and museums throughout California, and in Colorado, New York, and London.

Colburn gained his substantial reputation as a watercolorist and for his early paintings of the Monterey Peninsula in Northern California. He depicted the fisherman and activities around the wharf and in the canneries, and the hills and farm buildings around Salinas and Carmel Valley.

In Colburn's early landscapes, he is interested in structure and composition, trying to capture the essence of a scene with a Cezannesque interest in reducing volumes to shape and color. His early figural works of Monterey fisherman at work in the sardine canneries made famous by John Steinbeck, reduce the figures to blocky forms in the manner of Diego Rivera.

Colburn's later nudes, still lifes, and landscapes, made when the artist was in his eighties, are elegant, and entirely loose and expressive. The artist developed a vision of his own through the years, directly transferring his feeling for nature and the moment to the viewer.
