= Bill Adams (footballer, born 1921) =

English footballer (1921–1997)

Personal information
- Full name: William Victor Adams
- Date of birth: 10 May 1921
- Place of birth: Plymouth, England
- Date of death: June 1997 (aged 76)
- Place of death: Plymouth, England
- Position: Defender

Senior career*
| Years | Team | Apps | (Gls) |
| 1946–1947 | Plymouth Argyle | 1 | (0) |
- * Club domestic league appearances and goals

William Victor Adams (10 May 1921 – June 1997) was an English professional footballer who played in the Football League as a defender.

Adams joined Plymouth Argyle in April 1945. But he played here as of 1947. In the eve of New Year holiday in 1947 Plymouth Argyle played in the Second Division against Chesterfield (final score 1–4) before he left the club. After the season Adams returned to Plymouth United.
