= Monarch Grove Sanctuary =

Nature preserve in California

- IUCN category IV (habitat/species management area)
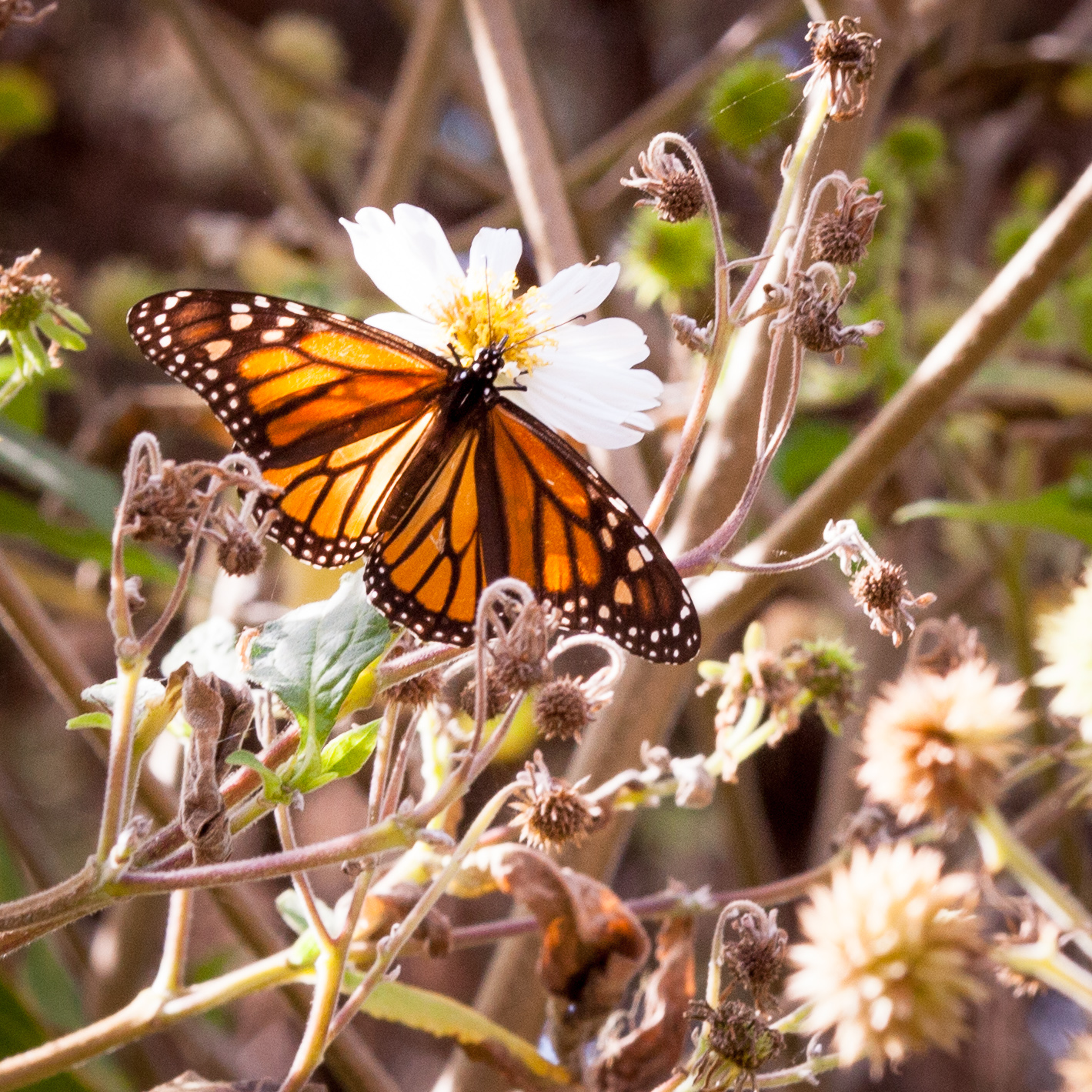
- A monarch butterfly at the sanctuary

- Location within California Location within the United States
- Location: 250 Ridge Rd, Pacific Grove, CA 93950
- Coordinates: 36.6264°N 121.9307°W
- Area: 2.696 acres (1.091 ha)
- Established: 1992
- Governing body: City of Pacific Grove

The Monarch Grove Sanctuary is an urban nature preserve in Pacific Grove, California. It protects the monarch butterflies that overwinter each year in Pacific Grove after migrating there and arriving in October. A volunteer crew maintains the sanctuary. About 12–16,000 butterflies stayed at the sanctuary during the 2022-23 winter, making it the fourth largest of its type in California.

== History ==
Del Monte Hotel Management first owned the land on which the sanctuary exists. It was then purchased by a local woman named Edna Dively to operate the Butterfly Grove Inn, which is still in operation. When plans for land development were made, local nature group leaders, led by Ro Vaccaro, stepped up to stop it from happening. Pacific Grove's citizens voted to create a tax to establish the sanctuary, in 1990, as a part of Measure G, City of Pacific Grove Butterfly Habitat and Bond Measure.

The city was able to collaborate with the California Department of Fish and Wildlife to go through with the purchase of the land, finalizing the acquisition in 1992. However, the construction of a motel among the butterfly trees to accommodate visitors destroyed a famous monarch overwintering site before or during 1993.

In 2004, a branch above the parking lot fell on Anne Dickinson Thomas, killing her. Her family sued for wrongful death against the city in 2006.

On December 12, 2024, the U.S. Fish and Wildlife Service published in the Federal Register a proposed rule that would list the monarch butterfly as a threatened species and would designate the butterfly's critical habitat per the provisions of the Endangered Species Act. The proposed rule designated seven areas near California's Pacific coast as "critical habitat units" for monarch butterflies. The Pacific Grove Monarch Butterfly Sanctuary is within one of these units.

== Description ==
Monarchs that winter at Monarch Grove Sanctuary live up to six months after reaching adulthood, in opposition to most other monarchs, which only live for four to five weeks. There is a fine of $1,000 for molesting or interfering with monarch butterflies within the city of Pacific Grove during their annual migratory visit, except under defined circumstances.

Additionally, a Scientific Collecting Permit (SCP) is required to handle wild monarchs in California including for educational purposes. It is unlawful to collect, remove from the wild and/or captively rear monarchs in the state without an SCP.

The sanctuary contains pine, cypress, oaks, coast redwood, and eucalyptus trees. Plant species include Monterey pine and Monterey cypress. Most of the monarchs are clustered around a "very dense" group of blue gum eucalyptus trees planted in 1917.
