= William Adam (artist) =

American painter

William Constable Adam
- Born: August 29, 1846; Tweedmouth, England
- Died: October 17, 1931 (aged 85); Pacific Grove, California, US
- Occupation: painter
- Spouses: Ada Rebecca Robertson (m. 1877; div. 1897) Mary Susan Taft (m. 1906)

William Constable Adam (29 August 1846 – 17 October 1931) was an English-born oil and watercolour painter of Scottish ancestry who spent the last 33 years of his life in California, United States.

== Biography ==
Adam was born just south of his paternal Scotland in Tweedmouth on the outskirts of Berwick-upon-Tweed in 1846.

After completing grammar school, he began evening classes at the Glasgow School of Art. According to the 1861 Census, he resided in Cathcart, now a suburb of Glasgow, with his large family; his occupation was given as "clerk." At the age of 19 he traveled to South America, studied art in Buenos Aires, worked as a broker in Montevideo, and in 1926 published a serialized travelogue of his adventures. On his return to Scotland (early 1870s) he continued his art training under Robert Greenlees and Robert Brydall, and was an early member of the Glasgow Art Club. After travels in north Africa and advanced training in Paris under Auguste Joseph Delécluse, he exhibited at the Royal Scottish Academy and the Royal Glasgow Institute of Fine Arts.

Following the death of his wife, Ada Rebecca Robertson (1857-1940), the childless William Adam migrated to the United States in 1893–94, settled in Massachusetts, joined the Boston Art Club, and was co-founder and president of the Lowell Art Club.

In 1898-99 he relocated to California and worked as an accountant for a mining company before moving permanently to the Monterey Peninsula. By 1901 he resided in the Methodist colony of Pacific Grove, California, began to display his paintings locally, and received an invitation to exhibit in San Francisco, California at the prestigious W. K. Vickery Gallery. After changing addresses twice he occupied in 1906 the Pacific Grove home at 450 Central Avenue with his new wife, Mary Susan Taft, who was a Maine-born widow and 18 years younger than her husband. Because he taught art class in Pacific Grove, he was known affectionately as "The Professor."

He exhibited at a variety of venues, including the Berkley Art Association in Berkeley, California, the Art Gallery at the luxury Hotel Del Monte in Monterey, California, and many private galleries in San Francisco. He spent much of his time at the nearby art colony of Carmel-by-the-Sea where he exhibited at the Carmel Arts and Crafts Club and the Carmel Art Association between 1906 and 1927. Especially popular with tourists were his (often repeated) renderings of the local Spanish architecture, lush gardens and charming scenes along the Pacific Coast. For competitive exhibitions he executed highly original landscapes which employed the bold dramatic brushwork of the French Impressionists.

== Death ==
William Adam died in Pacific Grove on 17 October 1931. His Central Avenue address has been restored by the local Heritage Society.
