= William Adams (footballer) =

English footballer

Personal information
- Full name: William Edward Adams
- Place of birth: Smethwick, England
- Position: Defender

Senior career*
Years	Team	Apps	(Gls)
1924	West Bromwich Albion	0	(0)
1925–1927	Walsall	45	(1)
- * Club domestic league appearances and goals

William Edward Adams was a footballer who played in The Football League for Walsall. He also played for West Bromwich Albion. He was born in Smethwick, England.
