= Billy Adams (footballer, born 1897) =

English footballer

Personal information
- Full name: William Adams
- Date of birth: 20 March 1897
- Place of birth: Blackheath, Worcestershire, England
- Date of death: 5 December 1945 (aged 48)
- Place of death: Smethwick, England
- Height: 5 ft 8 in (1.73 m)
- Position: Defender

Senior career*
Years	Team	Apps	(Gls)
–	Rowley Victoria		
1920–1926	West Bromwich Albion	92	(0)
1927–1928	Barrow	23	(0)
1929	Newport County	0	(0)
- * Club domestic league appearances and goals

William Adams (20 March 1897 – 5 December 1945) was a footballer who played in The Football League for Barrow and West Bromwich Albion. Adams also played for Newport County.

Adams later became the landlord of a local Black Country public house now known as The Bell Inn. It is located on Rood End Road, Rood End, Langley. Adams was later buried in Rood End Cemetery after his death.
