= William Howard Adams =

American author

William Howard Adams (1926 – July 5, 2023) was an American author, curator and lecturer on history and garden design. He was a senior fellow at the Dumbarton Oaks Research Library in Washington, D.C. and a Fellow of the International Center for Jefferson Studies. His house, Hazelfield, in Shenandoah Junction, West Virginia is listed on the National Register of Historic Places.

Adams was born in 1926 in Jackson County, Missouri and educated at the University of Missouri and the Washington and Lee University School of Law. In 1961 he was appointed to the Missouri Governor's Committee on the Arts as chairman. In 1965 Adams moved to Princeton, New Jersey, where he worked with the Rockefeller Brothers Fund, and was instrumental in the establishment of the National Endowment for the Arts. In 1969, Adams moved to the National Gallery of Art in Washington, D.C., curating a number of exhibitions.

Adams was an adjunct professor and lecturer at several colleges, including the Columbia Graduate School of Architecture, Planning and Preservation, Cooper Union School of Architecture, and the University of Virginia School of Architecture. As an art collector, he assembled works by Andy Warhol, Roy Lichtenstein, Claes Oldenburg, Cy Twombly, and Peter Saul.

Adams was predeceased by his wife Janet Woodbury Adams, and survived by three children.

== Books ==
- Grounds for Change: Major Gardens of the 20th Century
- Roberto Burle Marx: The Unnatural Art of the Garden
- The French Garden: 1500-1800 (1979)
- Atget's Gardens: A selection of Eugène Atget's garden photos (1979)
- A Proust Souvenir (1984)
- Jefferson's Monticello (1988)
- Denatured Visions: Landscape and Culture in the 20th Century (1991)
- Gardens Through History: Nature Perfected (1991)
- The Eye of Thomas Jefferson (1993)
- The Paris Years of Thomas Jefferson (1997)
- Gouverneur Morris: An Independent Life (2003)
- On Luxury: A Cautionary Take (2012)

== Television productions ==
- Nature Perfected: The Story of the Garden (Channel Four, 1995)
