= Carneros Creek (Monterey County, California) =

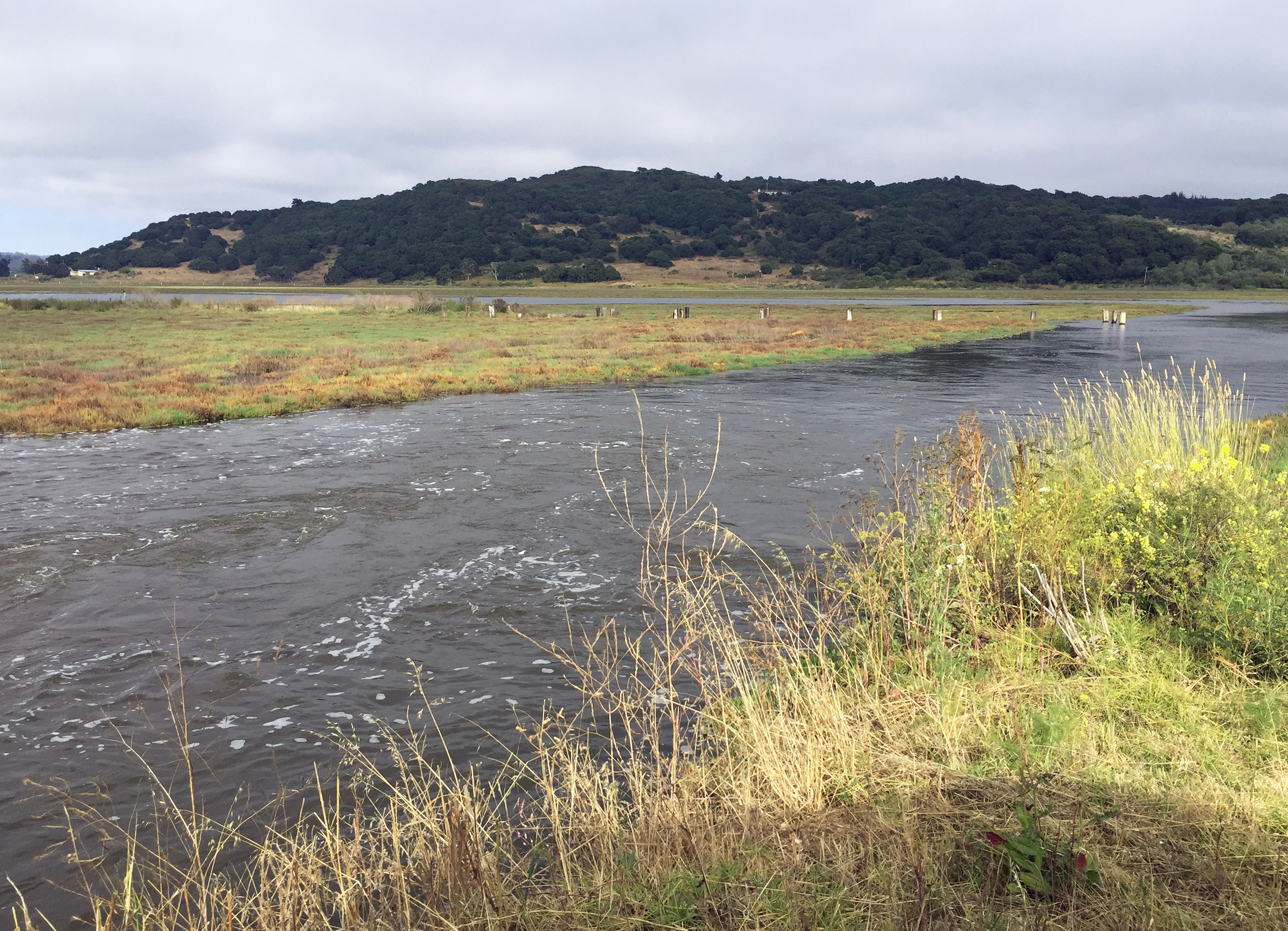
- Seawater can flow backwards into the mouth of Carneros Creek during high tides. View at the northern tip of Elkhorn Slough, looking northeast from Elkhorn Road towards the northern Gabilan Range near Las Lomas.

- Location of the mouth in California

Location
- Country: United States
- State: California
- Region: Monterey County, California
- City: Las Lomas

Physical characteristics
- Source
  - coordinates: 36°50′12.16″N 121°36′11.7″W
  - elevation: 357 ft (109 m)
- Mouth: Elkhorn Slough
  - coordinates: 36°51′32.60″N 121°44′49.09″W
  - elevation: 3 ft (0.91 m)
- Basin size: 170 sq mi (440 km^{2})

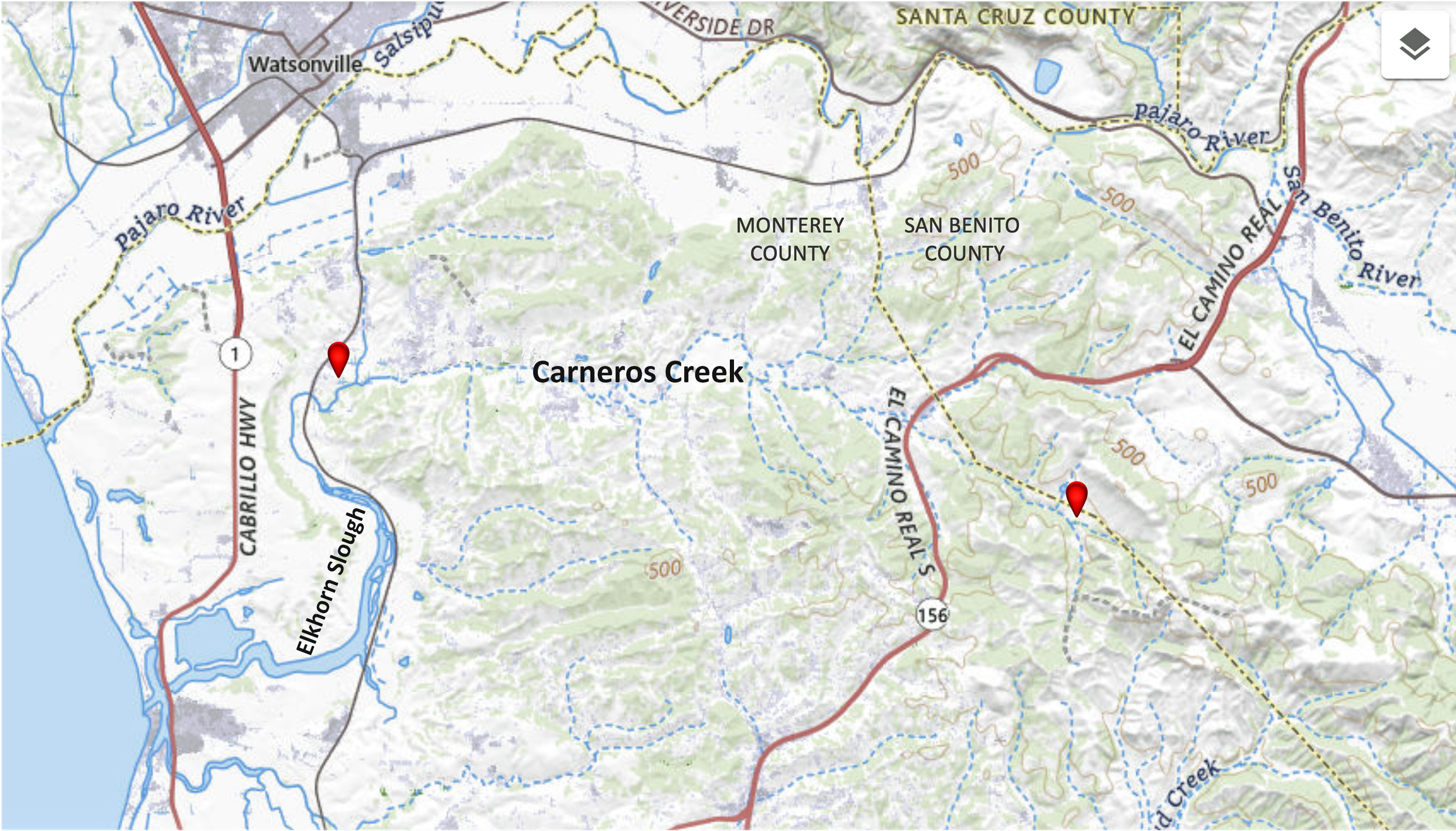
Carneros Creek is a critical wildlife connection between the northern Gabilan Range and Elkhorn Slough (mouth and source marked with red pins).

Carneros Creek is a westward flowing stream and is the primary source of freshwater flowing into Elkhorn Slough. The Carneros Creek official mainstem is 9.8 miles (15.8 km) long. Its source is in the northern Gabilan Range along Highway 101/156 and thus Carneros Creek is an important wildlife corridor from that mountain range in northern San Benito County to Elkhorn Slough, the historic mouth of the Salinas River in Monterey County. Carneros Creek empties into Monterey Bay via Elkhorn Slough at Moss Landing, California.

== History ==
Mexican land grants named Los Carneros, which is Spanish for "sheep", date to 1834, 1839 and 1842 in Monterey County. Just east of Elkhorn Slough was Rancho Los Carneros (Littlejohn), but east of Highway 156/101 was Rancho Los Carneros (McDougall). Also straddling Highway 101 to the east and west is the Cañada de la Carpenteria or "valley of the carpenter's shop" which was part of the Rancho Cañada de la Carpenteria.

== Watershed ==
The creek contributes an average of 2,800 acre feet to Elkhorn Slough annually. Because this creek previously contained the flow of the Pajaro River (whose present day watershed is just to the north) the creek bed is very coarse sand. Carneros Creek ran dry from June until December during the 2000 water year. Because the flow in the creek drops to zero over the summer months, seawater from Elkhorn Slough can flow back into the creek bed during high tides.

The source of the mainstem is at 357 feet (109 m) elevation on the western slope of the northern Gabilan Range, east of Highway 156/101, from whence it flows west to the highway where it is met by an eastern fork which begins further east in the Gabilan Range in San Benito County. The eastern fork flows westward along Rocks Road east of, then around the north flank of, Pinacate Peak until it crosses back into Monterey County and under Highway 156/101, joining the Carneros Creek mainstem in the Cañada de la Carpinteria. From its confluence with the eastern fork, the mainstem Carneros Creek flows westward along San Juan Road, Tarpy Road, then Hall Road before joining Elkhorn Slough at the southern boundary of the historic Mexican land grant Rancho Bolsa de San Cayetano, near Las Lomas.

The majority of the creek has been channelized in order to maximize the amount of land available for agriculture and cattle grazing. The channel walls have been reinforced with dredge spoil levees to provide some level of flood protection for the surrounding property. However, there is evidence that Carneros Creek was once a meandering stream with connected floodplains, oxbow ponds, and wetlands that would have supported riparian habitat and amphibian populations.

== Ecology ==
Agricultural and Land-based Training Association (ALBA) and through a 4-year USEPA grant, the Coastal Watershed Council (CWC) is monitoring the impacts of organic farming practices and wetland restoration on water quality in Carneros Creek at ALBA's Triple M Ranch in North Monterey County. Significant wetlands border Carneros Creek, although these have been greatly reduced by artificial levees in order to grow crops on the many small tenant farms along the creek. The federally endangered Santa Cruz long-toed salamander (SCLTS) (Ambystoma macrodactylum croceum) was found on Carneros Creek's Alba Ponds west of Johnson Road by an environmental DNA survey and also by field survey on Oxbow Pond along Carneros Creek, the only known breeding sites for SCLTS in the upper Elkhorn area. The federally threatened California red-legged frog (Rana draytonii) and California tiger salamander (Ambystoma californiense) often co-occur with and use similar habitats as the SCLTS and will likely benefit from Elkhorn Slough Foundation efforts to restore the Carneros Creek's riparian zone.

Federally endangered least Bell's vireo (Vireo bellii pusillus) were identified and reported to the California Natural Diversity Database on June 12, 2001, in the upper Carneros Creek watershed east of Highway 101. Federally threatened California red-legged frog and federally threatened California tiger salamander central California distinct population segment (DPS) were also detected at that location.

Federally threatened steelhead trout south-central California coast DPS have been collected from Elkhorn Slough.

Puma or mountain lion (Puma concolor) occur in the Carneros Creek watershed and are part of the central California coast evolutionary significant unit (ESU) under consideration for federal and state listing as threatened given their small numbers, poor connection to neighboring populations, and low genetic diversity. University of California, Davis wildlife biologist Calvin Duncan tracked a radiocollared puma that crossed U.S. Highway 101 along the Carneros Creek wildlife linkage in August 2024.

== See also ==
- Elkhorn Slough
- Elkhorn Slough National Estuarine Research Reserve
- List of rivers in California
