= Rancho Vega del Rio del Pajaro =

Mexican land grant in California

Coordinates: 36.900°N 121.700°W

Rancho Vega del Río del Pájaro was a 4,310-acre (17.4 km^{2}) Spanish land concession in present day Monterey County, California given in 1821 by Pablo Vicente de Solá to Antonio María Castro. The grant was confirmed by Mexican Governor José Figueroa in 1833. The name means "a meadow along the Pajaro River". The rancho lands bordered the Pajaro River and include the present day Vega and Watsonville.

== History ==
Antonio María Castro was a soldier who retired in 1809.

María Antonia Castro married Juan Miguel Anzar (grantee of Rancho Los Aromitas y Agua Caliente and Rancho Santa Ana y Quién Sabe). Anzar died and his widow, María Antonia Castro de Anzar married Frederick A. McDougal, a doctor from Scotland.

With the cession of California to the United States following the Mexican-American War, the 1848 Treaty of Guadalupe Hidalgo provided that the land grants would be honored. As required by the Land Act of 1851, María Antonia Castro filed a claim for Rancho Vega del Río del Pájaro with the Public Land Commission in 1852. María Antonia Castro de Anzar de McDougal died in 1855, leaving McDougal and her children as heirs when the grant was patented to Juan Miguel Anzar in 1864.

== See also ==
- Ranchos of California
- List of Ranchos of California
