= Rancho Agua Caliente =

Rancho Agua Caliente, meaning "hot water ranch" in Spanish, may refer to:

- Rancho Agua Caliente (Alameda County), a Mexican land grant in California
- Rancho Agua Caliente (Sonoma County), a Mexican land grant in California
- Rancho Las Aromitas y Agua Caliente, San Benito County
- Rancho Los Álamos y Agua Caliente, Kern County
