= Moss Landing, California =

Census designated place in United States

- Unincorporated Community; Census Designated Place
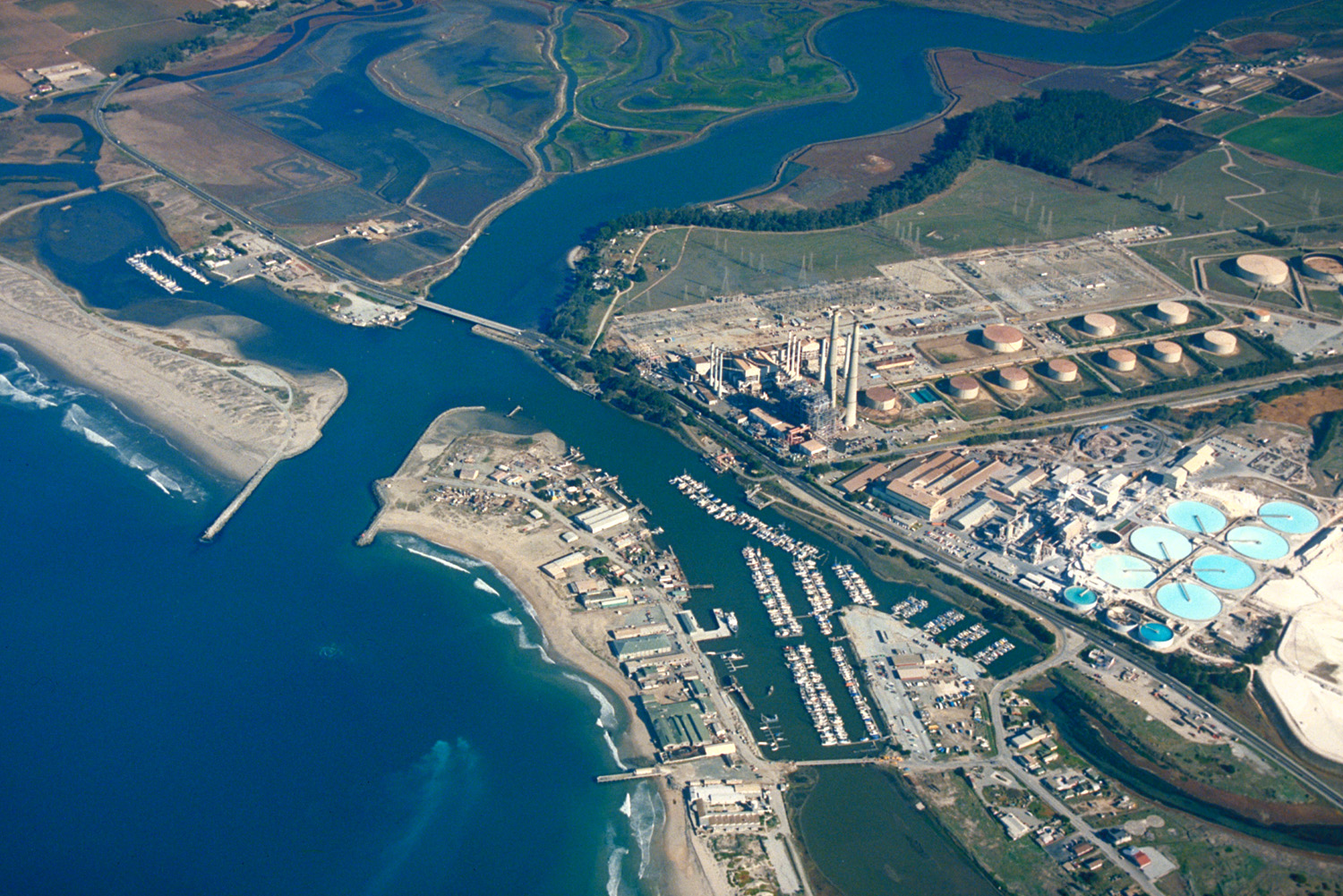
- Aerial view

- Location in Monterey County and the state of California

- Location in the United States
- Coordinates: 36°48′16″N 121°47′13″W
- Country: United States
- State: California
- County: Monterey

Government
  - State senator: John Laird (D)
  - Assemblymember: Dawn Addis (D)
  - U.S. Rep.: Jimmy Panetta (D)

Area
  - Total: 0.602 sq mi (1.56 km^{2})
  - Land: 0.392 sq mi (1.02 km^{2})
  - Water: 0.210 sq mi (0.54 km^{2}) 34.88%
- Elevation: 9.8 ft (3 m)

Population (2020)
  - Total: 237
  - Density: 604.6/sq mi (233.4/km^{2})
- Time zone: UTC-8 (Pacific)
  - Summer (DST): UTC-7 (PDT)
- ZIP code: 95039
- Area code: 831
- FIPS code: 06-49488
- GNIS feature IDs: 1659184, 2408874

Moss Landing, formerly Moss, is an unincorporated community and census-designated place (CDP) in Monterey County, California, United States. As of the 2020 census, Moss Landing had a population of 237. It is located 18 miles (29 km) north-northeast of Monterey, at an elevation of 10 feet (3.048 m). It is on the shore of Monterey Bay, at the mouth of Elkhorn Slough and at the head of the submarine Monterey Canyon.

== History ==
The earliest residents of the Moss Landing/Elkhorn Slough area were the Ohlone people. Evidence from archaeological digs show that they may have lived here as long ago as 4,000 years. The Spanish forced the Ohlone into the mission system in the 1700s from which few survived. "A total of 81,000 Indians were baptized and 60,000 deaths were recorded." After the mission system was secularized, the Mexican government granted vast ranchos to soldiers and others with connections, including the 30,901-acre (125.05 km^{2}) Rancho Bolsa Nueva y Moro Cojo. This grant extended from Moss Landing to present-day Prunedale and south to Castroville.

They farmed the land and ran cattle over the nearby hills. Americans arrived in the mid-1800s and farmers turned the area into cropland.

In the early 1860s Charles Moss, a Texas ship captain, established with the help of a partner a landing and wharf to handle the emerging grain trade in the Salinas Valley.

William B. Post earned a reputation as a skilled bear and deer hunter in the Big Sur region, and he traded in hides and buckskin. This work drew him north to Moss Landing. Post opened one of the first grain warehouses along the coast at Moss Landing. Flat bottom boats brought grain from all over the Salinas Valley to Elkhorn Slough and unloaded at Post's warehouse. W.B. became an agent for the steamship company of Goodall, Nelson and Perkins. The success of the shipping point stimulated the growth of Castroville, one of Monterey County's first municipalities, which served to support Moss Landing commerce.

The location was initially named "Moss", after Charles Moss. The Moss post office opened in 1895 and in 1917 changed its name to "Moss Landing". It became a busy whaling and fishing port and a location for fish processing plants and canneries. The Moss Landing Harbor District, established in the 1940s, dredged channels and built piers. The Moss Landing Power Plant opened in 1950. The California State University system founded Moss Landing Marine Laboratories in 1966 (it was rebuilt nearby after the Loma Prieta Earthquake destroyed the facility in 1989), and in the mid-1990s the Monterey Bay Aquarium Research Institute was moved to Moss Landing from Pacific Grove. In the 1980s, then-Monterey County Supervisor Marc Del Piero secured millions of dollars in federal grants to cure historic and chronic water pollution issues and sanitary sewers were installed.

In January 2025, a massive fire at the inside part of the Moss Landing Power Plant's lithium-ion battery storage facility made national news when it burned for days, releasing smoke in the area.

== Geography ==
Moss Landing is located in northern Monterey County, where Elkhorn Slough becomes an estuary as it flows into Monterey Bay at the head of the Monterey Submarine Canyon. California State Route 1 follows the eastern edge of the community, leading north 8 miles (13 km) to Watsonville and southwest 18 miles (29 km) to Monterey.

According to the United States Census Bureau, the CDP has a total area of 0.6 square miles (1.6 km^{2}), of which 0.4 square miles (1.0 km^{2}) are land and 0.2 square miles (0.5 km^{2}), or 34.88%, are water.

=== Climate ===
This region experiences warm (but not hot) and dry summers, with no average monthly temperatures above 71.6 °F. According to the Köppen Climate Classification system, Moss Landing has a warm-summer Mediterranean climate, abbreviated "Csb" on climate maps.

== Demographics ==
Historical population
Census	Pop.	Note	%±
2000	300		—
2010	204		−32.0%
2020	237		16.2%
U.S. Decennial Census; 1860–1870 1880-1890; 1900 1910 1920; 1930 1940 1950; 1960 1970 1980; 1990 2000 2010

Moss Landing first appeared as a census designated place in the 2000 U.S. census.

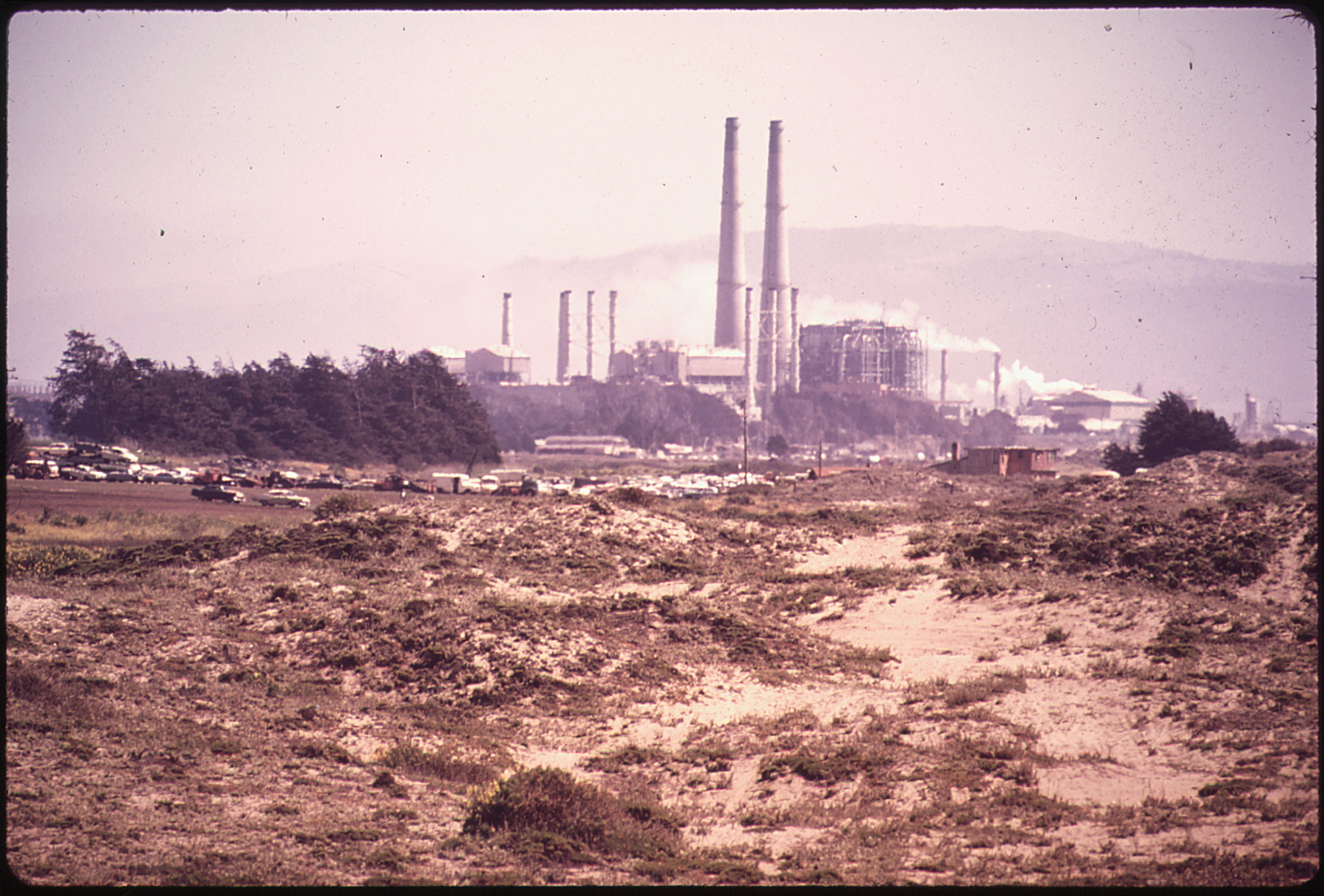
Moss Landing, 1972

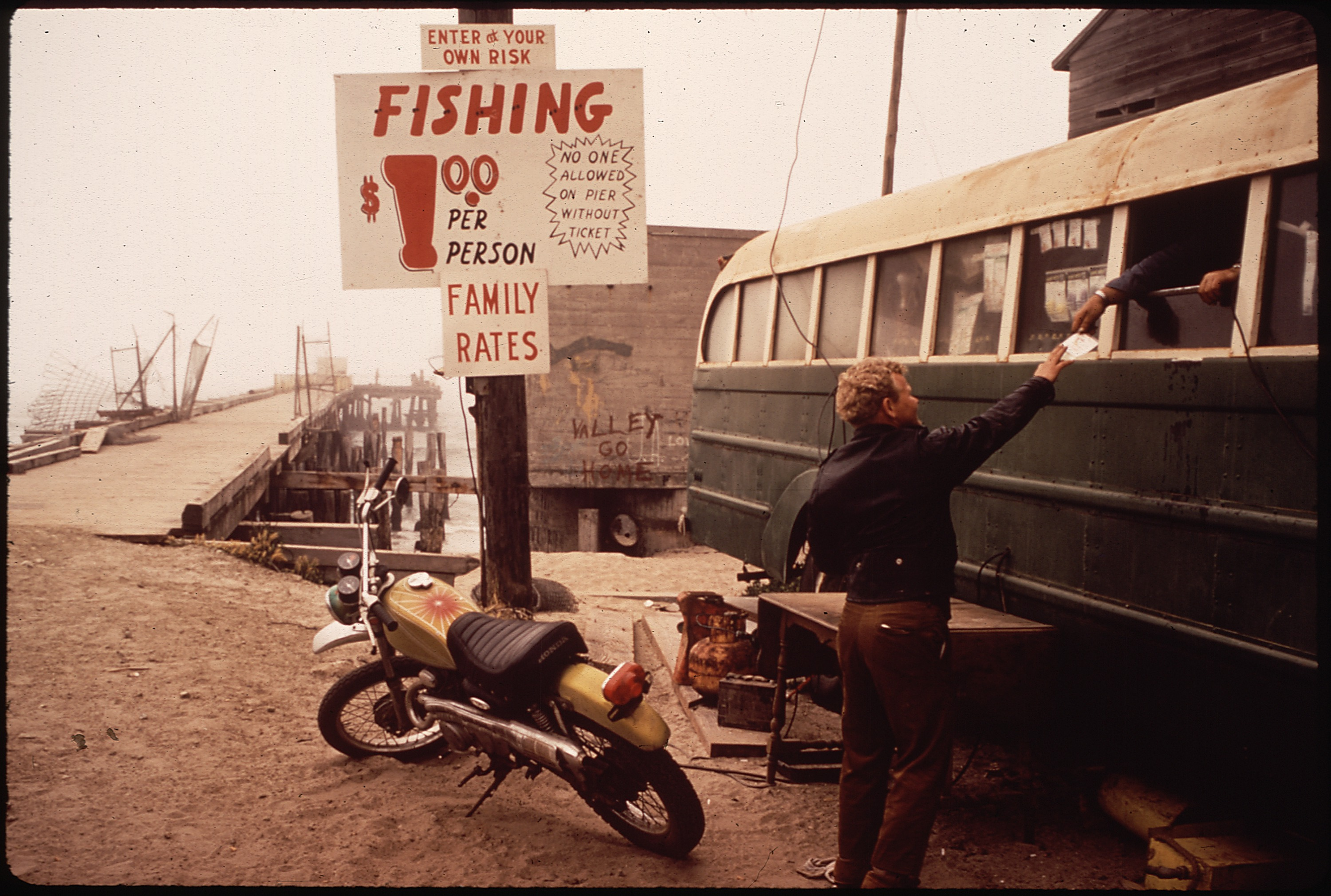
Moss Landing, 1972

=== 2020 ===
The 2020 United States census reported that Moss Landing had a population of 237. The population density was 595.5 inhabitants per square mile (229.9/km^{2}). The racial makeup of Moss Landing was 171 (72.2%) White, 1 (0.4%) African American, 2 (0.8%) Native American, 6 (2.5%) Asian, 1 (0.4%) Pacific Islander, 29 (12.2%) from other races, and 27 (11.4%) from two or more races. Hispanic or Latino of any race were 61 persons (25.7%).

The whole population lived in households. There were 114 households, out of which 35 (30.7%) had children under the age of 18 living in them, 36 (31.6%) were married-couple households, 21 (18.4%) were cohabiting couple households, 13 (11.4%) had a female householder with no partner present, and 44 (38.6%) had a male householder with no partner present. 43 households (37.7%) were one person, and 21 (18.4%) were one person aged 65 or older. The average household size was 2.08. There were 57 families (50.0% of all households).

The age distribution was 34 people (14.3%) under the age of 18, 22 people (9.3%) aged 18 to 24, 59 people (24.9%) aged 25 to 44, 68 people (28.7%) aged 45 to 64, and 54 people (22.8%) who were 65 years of age or older. The median age was 51.3 years. There were 138 males and 99 females.

There were 131 housing units at an average density of 329.1 units per square mile (127.1 units/km^{2}), of which 114 (87.0%) were occupied. Of these, 35 (30.7%) were owner-occupied, and 79 (69.3%) were occupied by renters.

=== 2010 ===
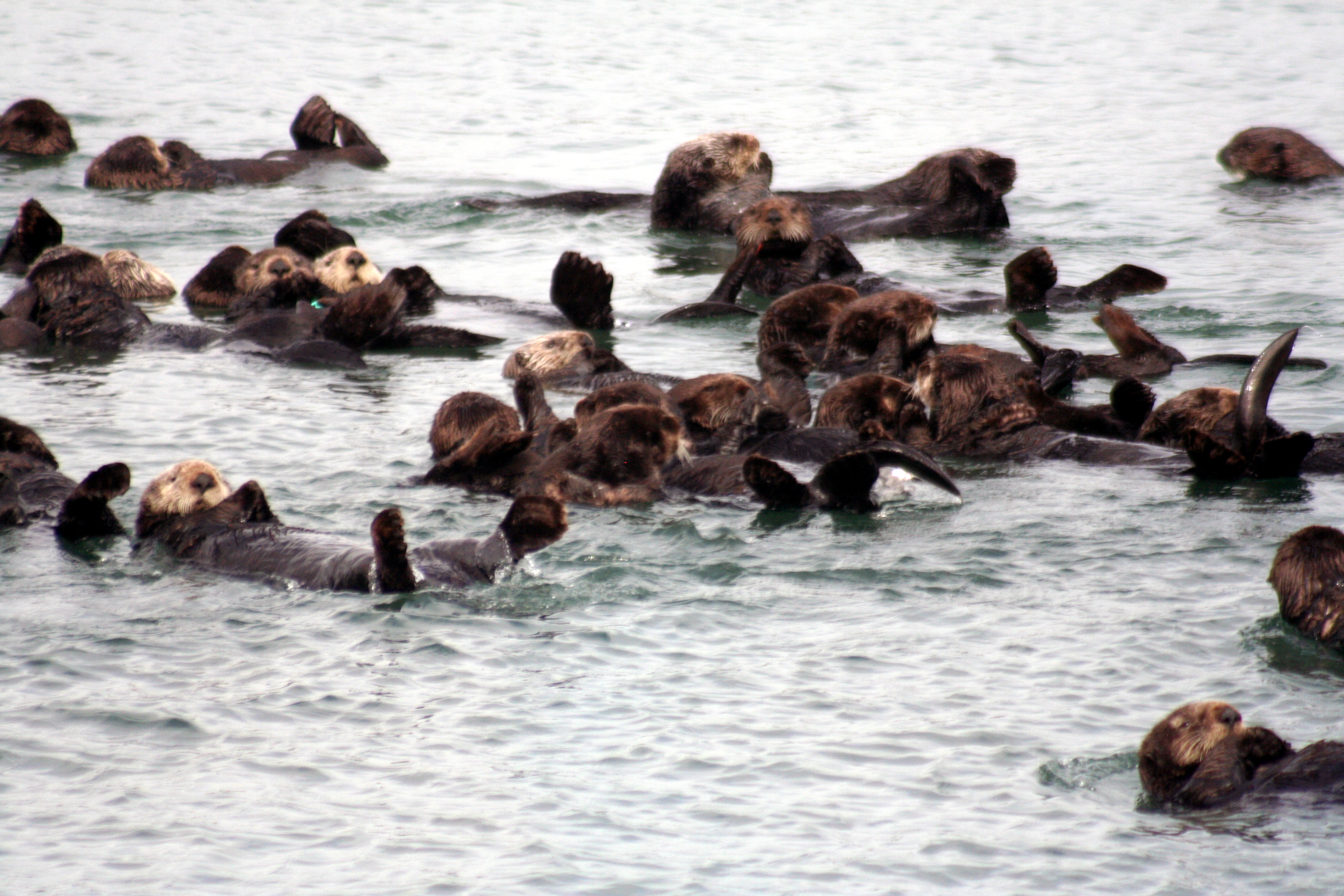
Sea otters at Moss Landing harbor

The 2010 United States census reported that Moss Landing had a population of 204. The population density was 338.3 inhabitants per square mile (130.6/km^{2}). The racial makeup of Moss Landing was 149 (73.0%) White residents, seven (3.4%) African American, one (0.5%) Native American, two (1.0%) Asian, one (0.5%) Pacific Islander, 30 (14.7%) from other races, and 14 residents (6.9%) of two or more races. There were 46 residents of Hispanic or Latino origin, of any race (22.5%).

The Census reported that 204 people (100% of the population) lived in households; no residents (0%) lived in non-institutionalized group quarters, and none (0%) were institutionalized.

There were 100 households, out of which 21 (21.0%) had children under the age of 18 living in them, 36 (36.0%) were opposite-sex married couples living together, 11 (11.0%) had a female householder with no husband present, 4 (4.0%) had a male householder with no wife present. There were 8 (8.0%) unmarried opposite-sex partnerships, and 0 (0%) same-sex married couples or partnerships. 41 households (41.0%) were made up of individuals, and 11 (11.0%) had someone living alone who was 65 years of age or older. The average household size was 2.04. There were 51 families (51.0% of all households); the average family size was 2.76.

There were 32 residents (15.7%) under the age of 18, eight (3.9%) aged 18 to 24, 54 (26.5%) aged 25 to 44, 84 (41.2%) aged 45 to 64, and 26 (12.7%) who were 65 years of age or older. The median age was 46.5 years. For every 100 females, there were 108.2 males. For every 100 females age 18 and over, there were 115.0 males.

There were 108 housing units at an average density of 179.1 per square mile (69.2/km^{2}), of which 55 (55.0%) were owner-occupied, and 45 (45.0%) were occupied by renters. The homeowner vacancy rate was 0%; the rental vacancy rate was 8.2%. 118 people (57.8% of the population) lived in owner-occupied housing units and 86 people (42.2%) lived in rental housing units.

=== 2000 ===
As of the census of 2000, the median income for a household in the CDP was $66,442, and the median income for a family was $66,731. Males had a median income of $41,154 versus $36,691 for females. The per capita income for the CDP was $28,005. About 13.0% of families and 18.8% of the population were below the poverty line, including 38.7% of those under the age of 18 and none of those 65 or over.

== Economy ==
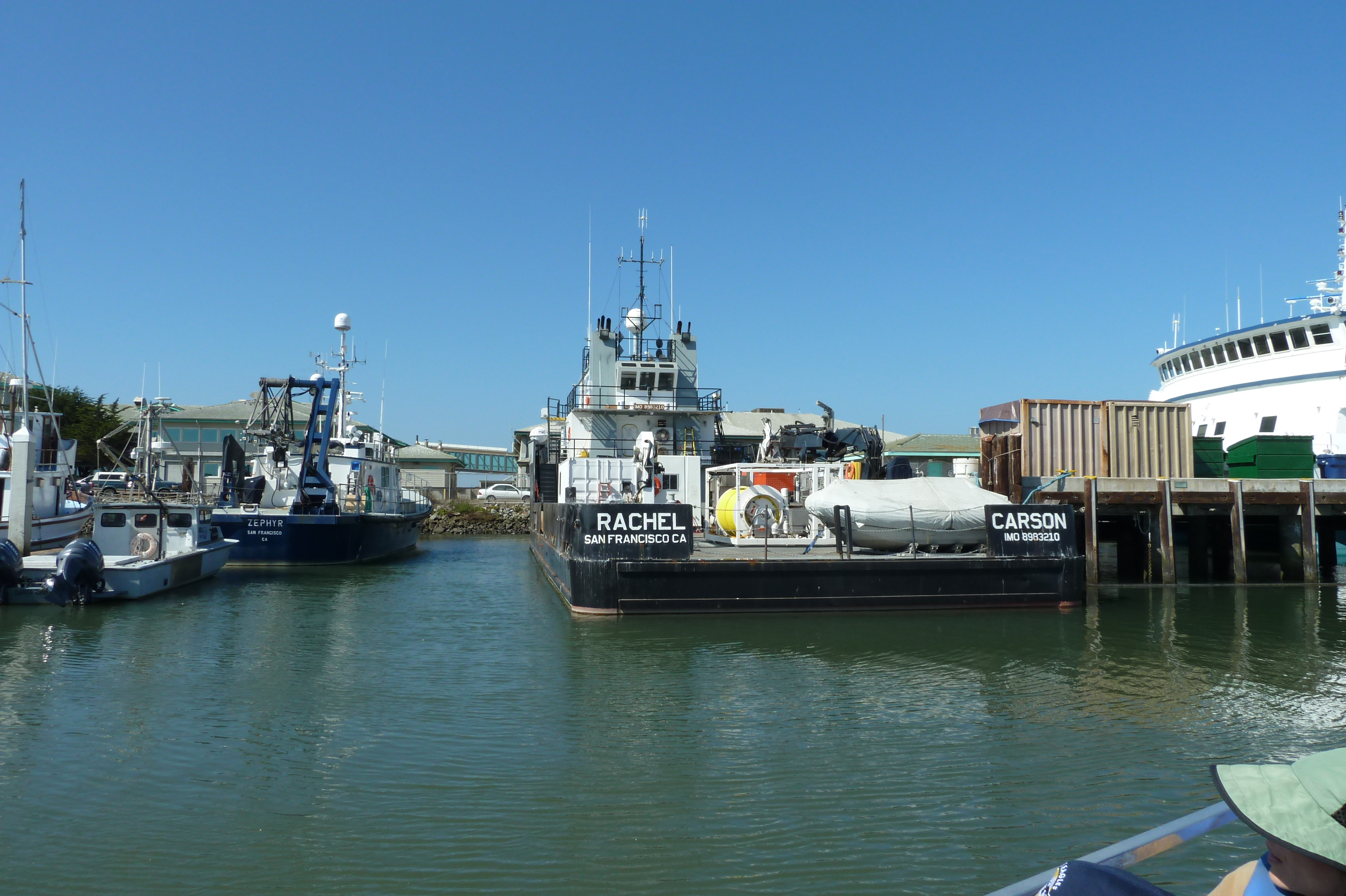
Monterey Bay Aquarium Research Institute

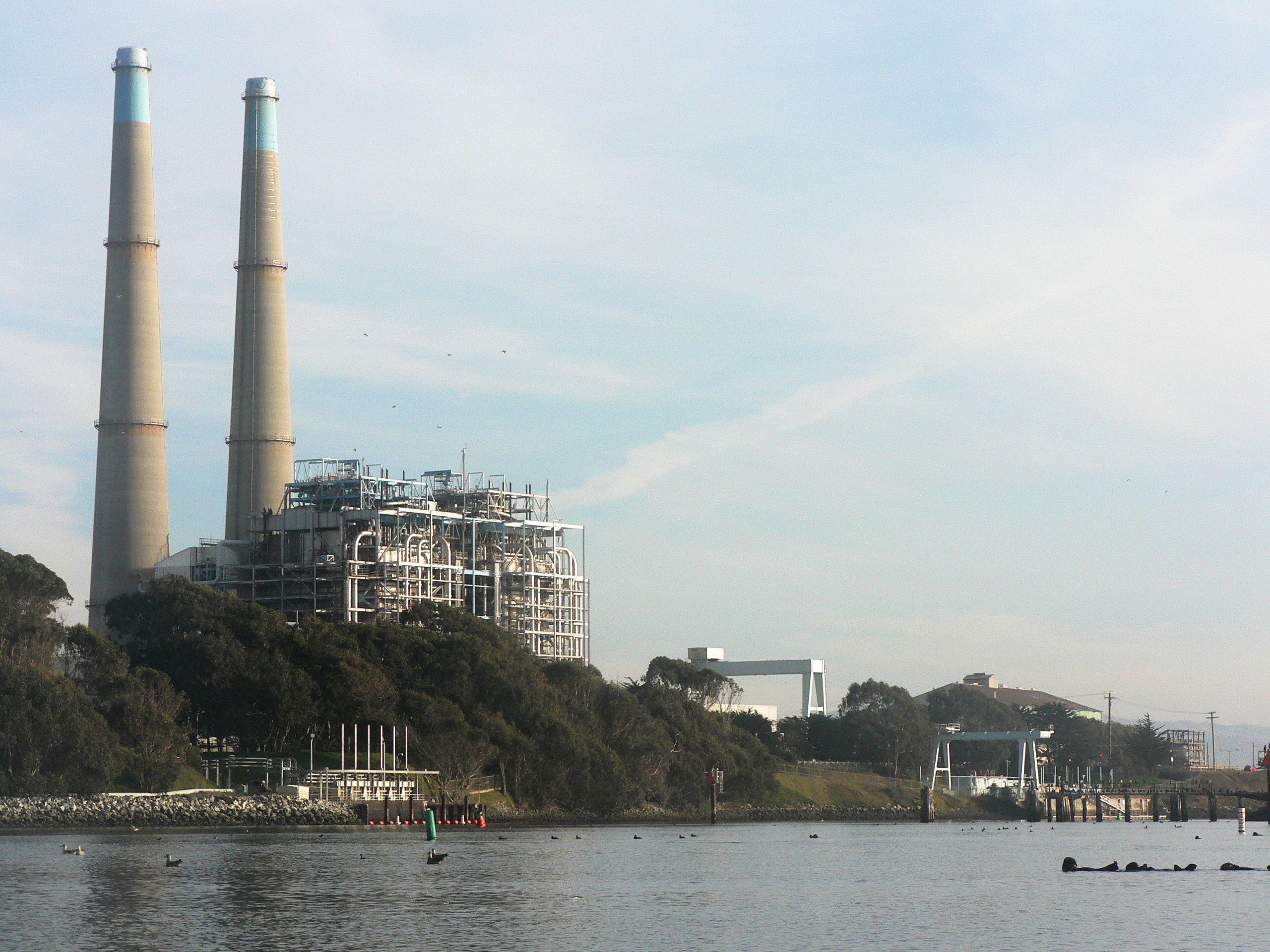
Moss Landing Power Plant

Located in Moss Landing is the Moss Landing Marine Laboratories, a multi-campus research facility of the California State University. Also located here is the Monterey Bay Aquarium Research Institute, a sister organization to the Monterey Bay Aquarium.

The Moss Landing Power Plant is a natural gas plant and was the largest battery storage facility in the world until it was almost entirely destroyed in a massive lithium ion battery fire in January, 2025.

Located at the intersection of State Route 1 and Dolan Road, it produced 2,538 megawatts prior to the fire, and is wholly owned by Vistra Corp. The structure remains visible from Santa Cruz, California to the north and Monterey, California to the south on clear days. There is a commercial park adjacent to the power plant, housing manufacturers and laboratories.

While intended as a backup for California's marginal electric grid, the plant could only power the state of California for about two minutes. Four fires have occurred in the last several years, causing a shutdown of the plant and emission of toxic air pollutants from the burning lithium-ion batteries.

Tourism is a large part of the economy in Moss Landing.

== Arts and culture ==
=== Annual cultural events ===
The Moss Landing Antique Street Fair is held annually on the last Sunday in July and hosts hundreds of antique vendors. It brings over ten times the population of Moss Landing to the area.

Other events include the May opener for rock cod fishing, blessing the fleet May 1, open house at Moss Landing Marine Labs held in April or May, and Nautical Flea Market held in May.

=== Tourism ===
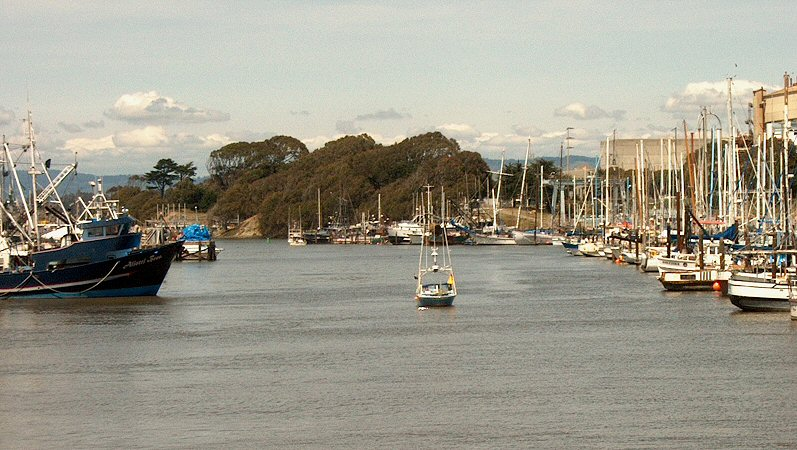
Pleasure and commercial boats at the Moss Landing harbor

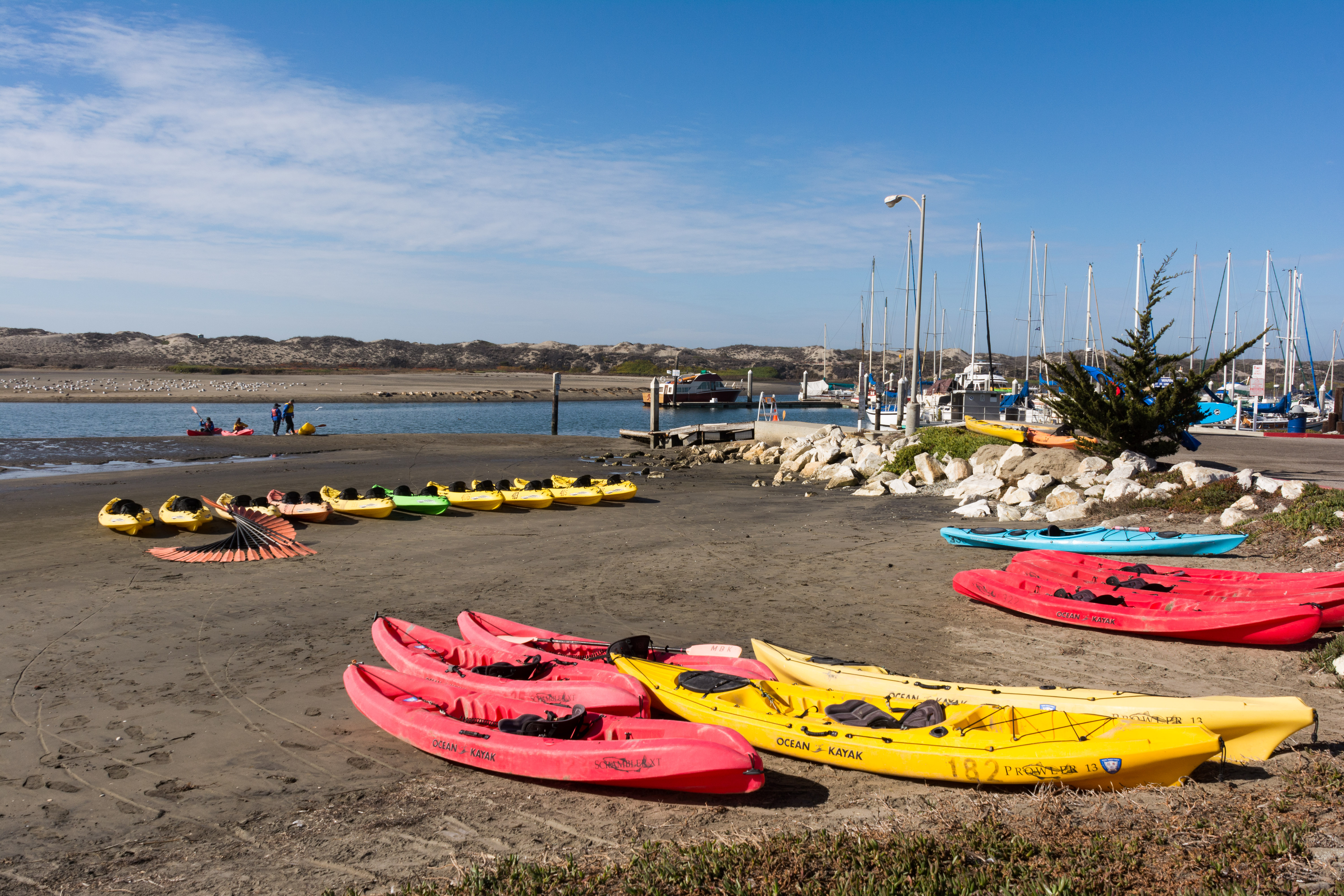
Kayaks at Moss Landing

Moss landing is most noted as the gateway to Elkhorn Slough, one of the largest wetlands in the state. Elkhorn Slough is a precious resource and is always ranked in the top 10 best birding spots in the US according to the Audubon's annual bird count. There are over 350 species of bird that migrate through the area annually. It is also known as one of the best spots in the world to see sea otters. Moss Landing lies in the northern part of Monterey County and has numerous restaurants, galleries, a bed and breakfast, and is the home port to many fishing and pleasure boats.

Moss Landing Harbor District berths over 600 boats, including 350 fishing boats, 200 pleasure craft, 30 research vessels, and a half dozen tour and charter boats. The harbor's commercial boats land dungeness crab, halibut, king salmon, albacore, rockfish, sablefish, anchovies, sardines, squid, black cod, red snapper, covina, prawns, mackerel, and others. Several maritime businesses support harbor users including a fuel dock. The harbor district also provides two public boat launches and a community park.

Moss Landing is also home to the Shakespeare Society of America.

== Parks and nature reserves ==
Moss Landing provides access to state and federal protected lands, including surfing destination Moss Landing State Beach, Salinas River State Beach, Zmudowski State Beach, Moss Landing Wildlife Area, and the Elkhorn Slough National Estuarine Research Reserve.
