= Quién Sabe Valley =

Valley in California

Quien Sabe Valley, originally known as Cañada de Quién Sabe, is a valley in the Diablo Range in San Benito County, California. It runs from its mouth, at an elevation of 1,572 feet (479 meters), to its head at 36°53′46″N 121°12′44″W at an elevation of 1,800 feet (550 meters). The valley is drained by Quién Sabe Creek, ultimately a tributary to the Pajaro River to the northwest.

== History ==
Quien Sabe Valley is the location of the Rancho Santa Ana y Quién Sabe.
