= Moss Landing Wildlife Area =

California State wildlife preserve

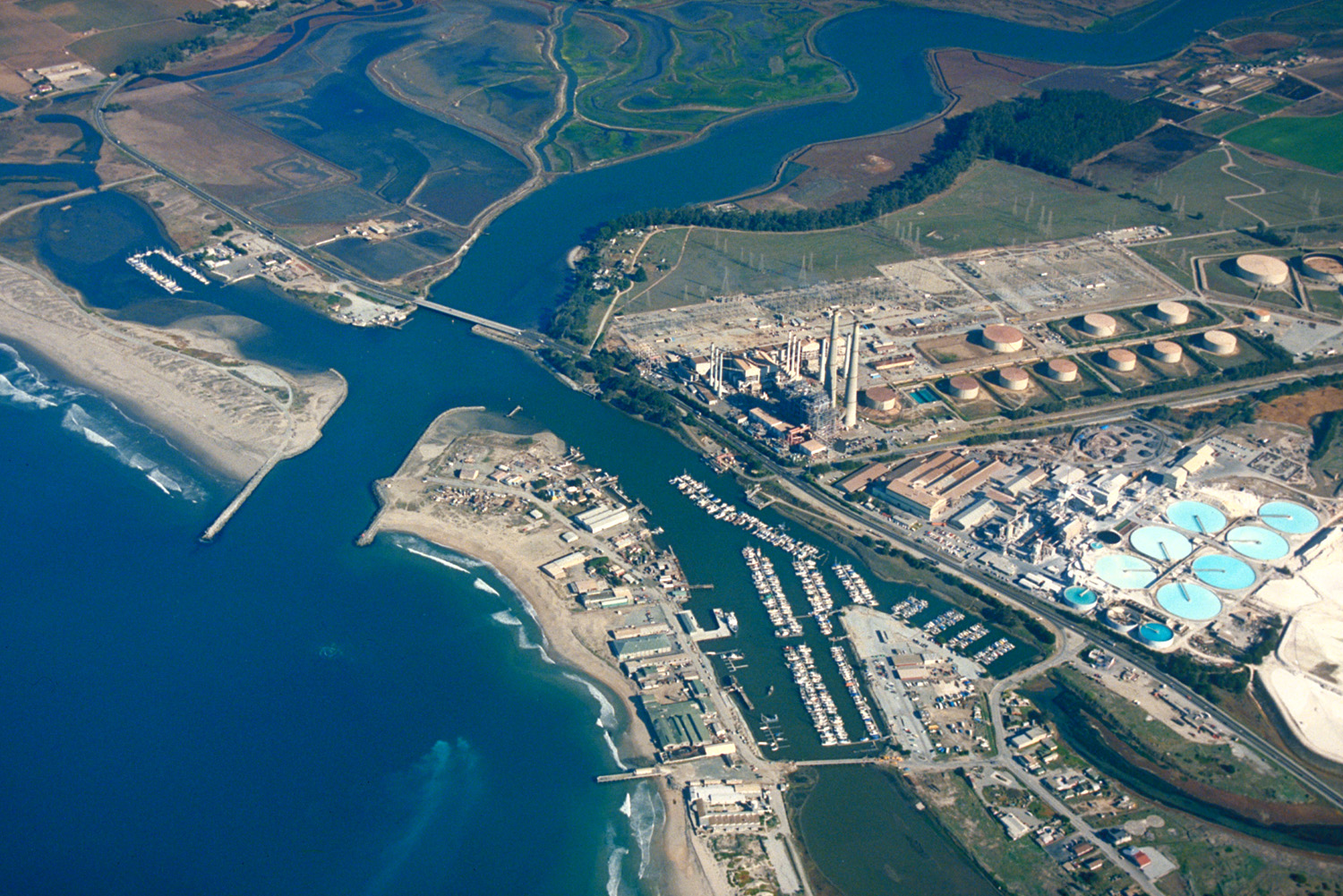
The reserve in upper left

Moss Landing Wildlife Area is a California State wildlife preserve on the shore of Elkhorn Slough.

== Description ==
The Moss Landing Wildlife Area protects 728 acres (295 ha) of Monterey County, California, just north of the town of Moss Landing, California. It includes part of the largest unaltered salt marsh on the California coast. Access is allowed only by foot on trails, and all plants and animals are protected. It is a popular spot for birding and viewing sea otters. Some limited hunting is allowed during certain limited seasons, but rifles or pistols are not allowed. It is administered through the California Department of Fish and Game.

A small strip of the reserve (the easiest to access) lies just east of Highway 1 (called the Cabrillo Highway) at 36°48′44″N 121°47′5″W opposite the Moss Landing Yacht Harbor. Other sections lie north of Elkhorn Slough, and west of the slough after it turns to the north, at 36°51′3″N 121°45′49″W. To access the north shore section, a trailhead is off Highway 1 between the two intersections of Struve Road, at 36°49′41″N 121°46′21″W. A level Marsh Trail runs from this area to a small picnic area, and then the main channel of Elkhorn Slough.

The eastern shore of Elkhorn Slough is protected as part of the Elkhorn Slough National Estuarine Research Reserve. Moss Landing State Beach and Zmudowski State Beach provide access to the Monterey Bay directly west of the wildlife area.

== History ==
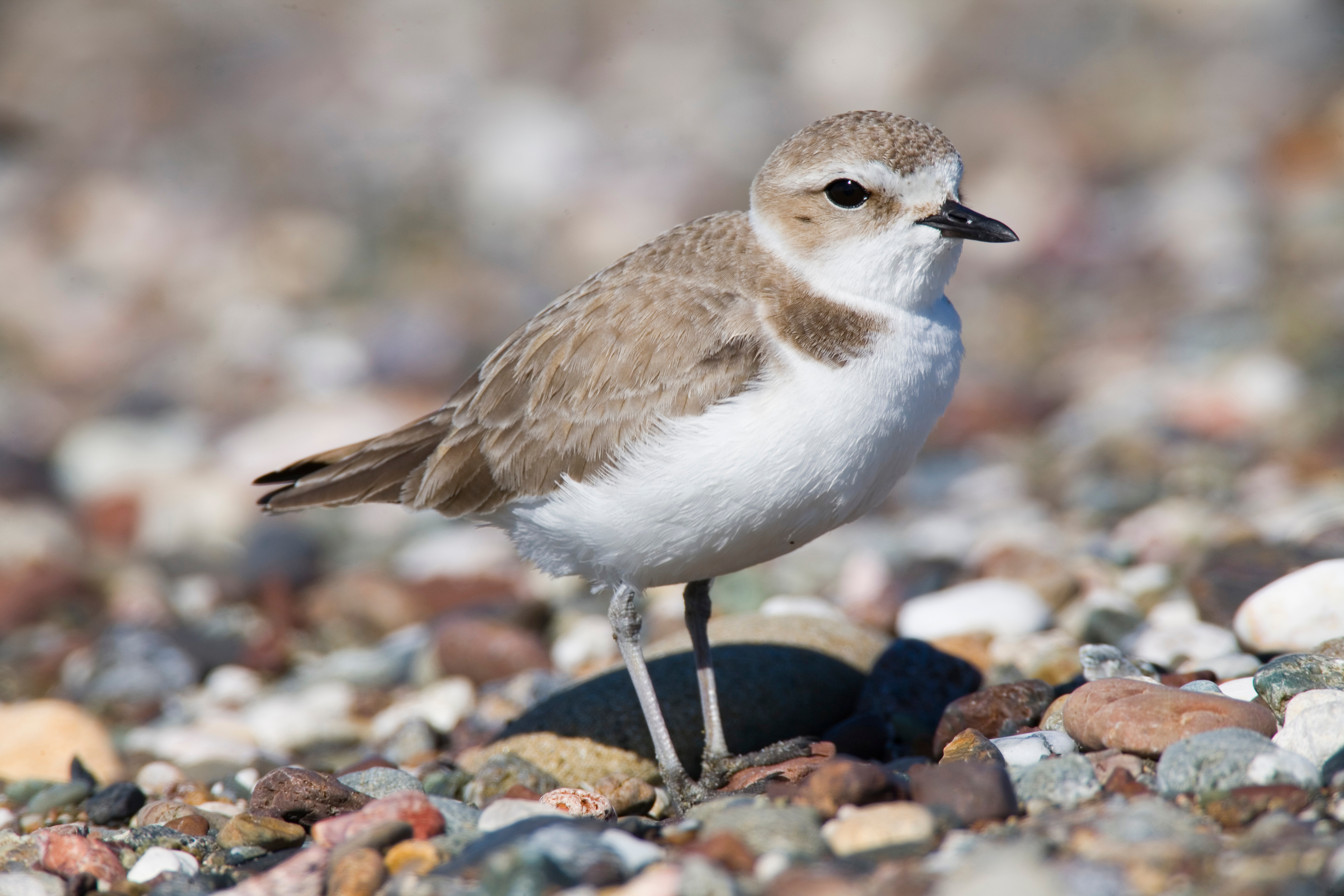
Western snowy plovers can be seen from the reserve.

In the late 1800s about 200 acres of what is now the wildlife area were salt evaporation ponds used to commercially produce sea salt for use in local fish canneries. Owned by the Moss Landing Salt Works, the ponds were abandoned in 1974. The wildlife area was established by the state of California in 1984, and was managed in cooperation with the Monterey Bay National Marine Sanctuary when it was established in 1992.

The former salt ponds provide habitat for several shorebird species. The number of western snowy plovers (Charadrius nivosus) nesting in the ponds in spring improved after active management began in 1995 by the Point Reyes Bird Observatory Conservation Science group. In 1999 the ponds were identified as the most critical breeding habitat in the Monterey Bay region for the plovers. In 2006 a managed tidal flow was improved, funded by Ducks Unlimited, the California Wildlife Conservation Board and the National Fish and Wildlife Foundation. In late fall water levels are raised to encourage roosting brown pelicans. In early spring (March or April) the ponds are drained and before the mud dries, volunteers are organized into a "mudstomp" to create shallow impressions as nesting sites.

Binoculars, telescopes, or cameras with telephoto lenses are best used for viewing since observers are restricted from getting too close. Herons, sandpipers, egrets and other waterbirds also are seen in season. The northern entrance and trails can often be closed to public access.
