= Carneros Creek =

Carneros Creek may refer to:

== Watercourses ==
- Carneros Creek (Monterey County, California), Monterey County, California, United States
- Carneros Creek (Napa River), tributary to the Napa River, Napa County, California, United States
- Carneros Creek (Santa Barbara County, California), Santa Barbara County, California, United States
- Carneros Creek (Santos Creek), San Luis Obispo and Kern Counties, California, United States
