= Moro Cojo Slough State Marine Reserve =

Marine protected area near Monterey, California

Moro Cojo Estuary State Marine Reserve
- Location within California Location within the United States
- Coordinates: 36.8025°N 121.784722°W
- Established: 2007
- Governing body: California Department of Fish and Game

Moro Cojo Estuary State Marine Reserve (SMR) is a marine protected area established to protect the wildlife and habitats in Moro Cojo Slough. Moro Cojo Slough is located inland from Monterey Bay on the central coast of California, directly south of the more widely known Elkhorn Slough. The area covers 0.46 square miles (1.2 km^{2}). The SMR protects all marine life within its boundaries. Fishing and take of all living marine resources is prohibited.

== History ==
The Moro Cojo SMR was established in September 2007 by the California Fish and Game Commission. It was one of 29 marine protected areas adopted during the first phase of the Marine Life Protection Act Initiative. The Marine Life Protection Act Initiative (or MLPAI) is a collaborative public process to create a statewide network of marine protected areas along the California coastline.

Within Moro Cojo SMR all living marine resources are protected.

== Geography and natural features ==
Moro Cojo SMR is near the Moss Landing State Wildlife Area, the Elkhorn Slough State Marine Reserve and the Elkhorn Slough State Marine Conservation Area.

Moro Cojo SMR includes the waters within Moro Cojo Slough below mean high tide and east of the Highway 1 Bridge and west of the crossing of the Southern Pacific railroad tracks.

== Habitat and wildlife ==
Moro Cojo Slough provides representation of rare brackish habitats that support threatened species. Habitat types include mudflats, tidal creeks and channels.

Moro Cojo and nearby Elkhorn sloughs host year-round residents tightly associated with estuaries, such as pickleweed, eelgrass, oysters, gaper clams, and longjaw mudsuckers, as well as important seasonal visitors such as migratory shorebirds, sea otters, and sharks and rays.

== Recreation and nearby attractions ==
The nearby Elkhorn Slough National Estuarine Research Reserve and Elkhorn Slough Foundation provide on-site management, education, and stewardship and offer public access via 5 miles (8.0 km) of trails, as well as a Visitor Center and volunteer opportunities.

Also nearby is the Moss Landing Wildlife Area which protects 728 acres (2.95 km^{2}) of salt ponds and salt marsh. Limited recreation is permitted within the Wildlife Area.

California’s marine protected areas encourage recreational and educational uses of the ocean. Activities such as kayaking, diving, snorkeling, and swimming are allowed unless otherwise restricted.

== Scientific monitoring ==
As specified by the Marine Life Protection Act, select marine protected areas along California’s central coast are being monitored by scientists to track their effectiveness and learn more about ocean health. Similar studies in marine protected areas located off of the Santa Barbara Channel Islands have already detected gradual improvements in fish size and number.
