= Rancho Los Carneros (Littlejohn) =

Mexican land grant in California

Coordinates: 36.850°N 121.700°W

Rancho Los Carneros was a 4,482-acre (18.14 km^{2}) Mexican land grant in present-day Monterey County, California, given in 1834 by Governor José Figueroa to David Littlejohn. The name means quite literally "Ranch of the Rams". The grant was east of Elkhorn Slough and encompassed present-day Elkhorn.

== History ==
The one square league grant was given to Scotsman David (Francisco Xavier) Littlejohn (1795–1847) who came to California in 1824 aboard a Hartnell ship from Peru. He married Francisca Antonia Higuera in 1826. Their daughter Maria Antonia Littlejohn (1827-) married Francisco Maria Castro 1851, and the other daughter Maria Elena Littlejohn (1833-) married Becinto Avila about 1852.

With the cession of California to the United States following the Mexican-American War, the 1848 Treaty of Guadalupe Hidalgo provided that the land grants would be honored. As required by the Land Act of 1851, a claim for Rancho Los Carneros was filed with the Public Land Commission in 1853, and the grant was patented to David Littlejohn in 1866.

== See also ==
- Ranchos of California
- List of Ranchos of California
