= Las Lomas, California =

- Census-designated place
- Location in Monterey County and the state of California

- Location in the United States
- Coordinates: 36°51′55″N 121°44′06″W
- Country: United States
- State: California
- County: Monterey

Government
  - State senator: John Laird (D)
  - Assemblymember: Robert Rivas (D)
  - U. S. rep.: Zoe Lofgren (D)

Area
  - Total: 1.037 sq mi (2.686 km^{2})
  - Land: 1.037 sq mi (2.686 km^{2})
  - Water: 0 sq mi (0 km^{2}) 0%
- Elevation: 43 ft (13 m)

Population (2020)
  - Total: 3,046
  - Density: 2,937/sq mi (1,134/km^{2})
- Time zone: UTC-8 (Pacific)
  - Summer (DST): UTC-7 (PDT)
- ZIP code: 95076 (Watsonville)
- Area code: 831
- FIPS code: 06-40592
- GNIS feature IDs: 1655082, 2408578

Las Lomas (Spanish for 'The Hills') is an unincorporated community and census-designated place (CDP) in Monterey County, California, United States. Las Lomas is located 7 miles (11 km) north-northwest of Prunedale. The elevation is 43 feet (13 m). The population was 3,046 at the 2020 census.

== History ==
The town was formerly known as "Hall".

Prior to 1981, the community suffered from grave water contamination and public health problems. Sanitary sewers for the entire area were installed in 1981-82 due to federal grants secured by then Monterey County Supervisor Marc Del Piero.

== Geography ==
Las Lomas is located in northern Monterey County on County Route G12 between Prunedale and Pajaro. The Elkhorn Slough, a 7-mile-long (11 km) tidal slough and estuary that empties into Monterey Bay, is just south of the community.

According to the United States Census Bureau, the CDP has a total area of 1.0 square mile (2.7 km^{2}), all land.

== Demographics ==
Historical population
Census	Pop.	Note	%±
1980	1,740		—
1990	2,127		22.2%
2000	3,078		44.7%
2010	3,024		−1.8%
2020	3,046		0.7%
U.S. Decennial Census 1980; 1990 2000 2010

Las Lomas first appeared as a census designated place in the 1980 United States census.

=== 2020 census ===
As of the 2020 census, Las Lomas had a population of 3,046. The population density was 2,937.3 inhabitants per square mile (1,134.1/km^{2}). The median age was 30.1 years. The age distribution was 29.9% under the age of 18, 11.2% aged 18 to 24, 28.3% aged 25 to 44, 21.0% aged 45 to 64, and 9.6% who were 65 years of age or older. For every 100 females, there were 107.1 males, and for every 100 females age 18 and over there were 110.3 males.

The whole population lived in households. There were 618 households, out of which 57.3% included children under the age of 18, 65.4% were married-couple households, 8.4% were cohabiting couple households, 14.9% had a female householder with no partner present, and 11.3% had a male householder with no partner present. Of all households, 6.6% were one person households, and 2.1% were one person aged 65 or older. The average household size was 4.93. There were 546 families (88.3% of all households).

There were 630 housing units at an average density of 607.5 units per square mile (234.6 units/km^{2}), of which 618 (98.1%) were occupied. Of the housing units, 1.9% were vacant. Of the occupied units, 69.3% were owner-occupied and 30.7% were occupied by renters. The homeowner vacancy rate was 0.0%, and the rental vacancy rate was 2.1%.

0.0% of residents lived in urban areas, while 100.0% lived in rural areas.

Racial composition as of the 2020 census
Race	Number	Percent
White	363	11.9%
Black or African American	10	0.3%
American Indian and Alaska Native	95	3.1%
Asian	23	0.8%
Native Hawaiian and Other Pacific Islander	7	0.2%
Some other race	1,903	62.5%
Two or more races	645	21.2%
Hispanic or Latino (of any race)	2,785	91.4%

=== Income and poverty ===
In 2023, the US Census Bureau estimated that the median household income was $78,869, and the per capita income was $23,804. About 10.8% of families and 11.8% of the population were below the poverty line.

=== 2010 census ===
At the 2010 census Las Lomas had a population of 3,024. The population density was 2,916.2 inhabitants per square mile (1,126.0/km^{2}). The racial makeup of Las Lomas was 1,167 (38.6%) White, 37 (1.2%) African American, 93 (3.1%) Native American, 53 (1.8%) Asian, 24 (0.8%) Pacific Islander, 1,490 (49.3%) from other races, and 160 (5.3%) from two or more races. Hispanic or Latino of any race were 2,696 persons (89.2%).

The whole population lived in households, no one lived in non-institutionalized group quarters and no one was institutionalized.

There were 598 households, 393 (65.7%) had children under the age of 18 living in them, 415 (69.4%) were opposite-sex married couples living together, 69 (11.5%) had a female householder with no husband present, 47 (7.9%) had a male householder with no wife present. There were 35 (5.9%) unmarried opposite-sex partnerships, and 4 (0.7%) same-sex married couples or partnerships. 42 households (7.0%) were one person and 9 (1.5%) had someone living alone who was 65 or older. The average household size was 5.06. There were 531 families (88.8% of households); the average family size was 5.13.

The age distribution was 1,001 people (33.1%) under the age of 18, 368 people (12.2%) aged 18 to 24, 900 people (29.8%) aged 25 to 44, 560 people (18.5%) aged 45 to 64, and 195 people (6.4%) who were 65 or older. The median age was 27.7 years. For every 100 females, there were 111.2 males. For every 100 females age 18 and over, there were 112.3 males.

There were 623 housing units at an average density of 600.8 per square mile, of the occupied units 368 (61.5%) were owner-occupied and 230 (38.5%) were rented. The homeowner vacancy rate was 1.1%; the rental vacancy rate was 2.5%. 1,875 people (62.0% of the population) lived in owner-occupied housing units and 1,149 people (38.0%) lived in rental housing units.
