= Pablo Vicente de Solá =

Governor of Alta California (1761–1826)

2nd Governor of Alta California
- In office 30 August 1815 – 10 November 1822
- Preceded by: José Darío Argüello
- Succeeded by: Luis Antonio Argüello

Personal details
- Born: 1761 Mondragón, Gipuzkoa, Kingdom of Spain
- Died: 1826 (aged 64–65) Mexico City, Mexico
- Profession: Politician, soldier

Pablo Vicente de Solá (1761–1826) was a Spanish-born Mexican officer and the twelfth and last Spanish colonial governor of Alta California (1815-1822). He was born in Mondragón, Gipuzkoa, Spain. Following Mexico's independence, he represented Alta California in the Congress of the Union in Mexico City.

== Land grants ==
Solá granted in 1821 the 3,127-acre (1,265 ha) Rancho Rincón de los Bueyes to Bernardo Higuera and Cornelio López. It lay in present-day Los Angeles County, California, encompassing contemporary Cheviot Hills, Rancho Park, the northeast extension of Culver City, and a small section of Baldwin Hills with Ballona Creek. He explored the valleys of California to help select possible sites on which to build new Spanish missions.

Other Spanish land grants of Solá include:

- Rancho La Puente
- Rancho El Conejo
- Rancho Los Tularcitos
- Rancho Bolsa del Potrero y Moro Cojo
- Rancho San Antonio (Peralta)
- Rancho Vega del Río del Pájaro

== Independent Mexico ==
Solá served under Spanish colonial rule until Mexico became independent in 1821. Transfer of Spanish California to Mexico was completed with little disruption, and Solá himself presided over the changing of flags in 1822. News of Mexico's victory slowly reached north to Alta California, and it was only in 1822 that Luis Antonio Argüello replaced Solá as the Mexican provisional governor and then as the first appointed Territorial governor appointed by Mexico. Argüello was also the first native-born Californian to govern the state. He at first was very opposed to the independence revolution. He threatened anyone in favor of the Mexican revolution, but when Canon Agustín Fernández de San Vicente, the commissioner from the imperial Spanish regency, came to Monterey and asked him to transfer his allegiance to Mexico, he complied. He took down the Spanish flag and raised the new Mexican flag. In his tenure one new mission was founded: Mission San Rafael Arcángel on December 14, 1817.

== Hippolyte Bouchard ==
Hippolyte Bouchard – a pirate and corsair – sailed towards California to disrupt Spanish trade. However, the Spanish authorities knew his intentions since on 6 October the Clarion had reported two corsair ships were ready to attack the Californian coast. The governor Pablo Vicente de Solá in Monterey ordered removal from the city all valuables and two thirds of the gunpowder stocked in the military outposts.

On 20 November 1818, the watchman of Punta de Pinos, at the tip of the southern end of Monterey Bay, sighted the two Argentine ships. The Solá was informed; the Spanish prepared the cannons along the coastline, the garrison manned their battle stations, and the women, children, and men unfit to fight were sent to an inland mission at Soledad.

Bouchard met with his officers to design the attack plan. Sir Peter Corney knew the bay from two previous visits to Monterey. They used the corvette Santa Rosa to attack since the deep draft frigate La Argentina might run aground. The frigate had to be towed by small boats and out of range of the Spanish artillery. Once it was out of range, Bouchard sent captain Sheppard to the Santa Rosa, leading two hundred soldiers, carrying firearms and lances. On 24 November, before dawn, Bouchard ordered his men to board the boats. They were 200: 130 had rifles and 70 had spears. They landed 7 km (4.3 mi) away from the fort in a hidden creek. The fort resisted ineffectively, and after an hour of combat the Argentine flag flew over it. The Argentines took the city for six days, during which time they stole the cattle and burned the fort, the artillery headquarters, the governor's residence and the Spanish houses. The town's residents were unharmed. On 3 April 1819 Hippolyte Bouchard's California expedition ended. He went to Valparaíso in Chile in order to collaborate with José de San Martín's campaign to liberate Peru.

== Character, intellect ==
Solá kept in line with Borica's Enlightenment outlook. He imported schoolteachers and he even supported two of them with his personal funding.

During his term in office, another Basque, Vicente Francisco de Sarría, was the president of the California missions. However, their relationship was not as close as that of Diego de Borica and Lasuén because of their different stance on the contemporary events affecting the Basque Country and Spain.

Governor de Solá helped the youthful Mariano Guadalupe Vallejo get a formal education from an English tutor and taught him about California politics that helped him become leader later in life.

== See also ==
- List of pre-statehood governors of California
- List of Ranchos of California
