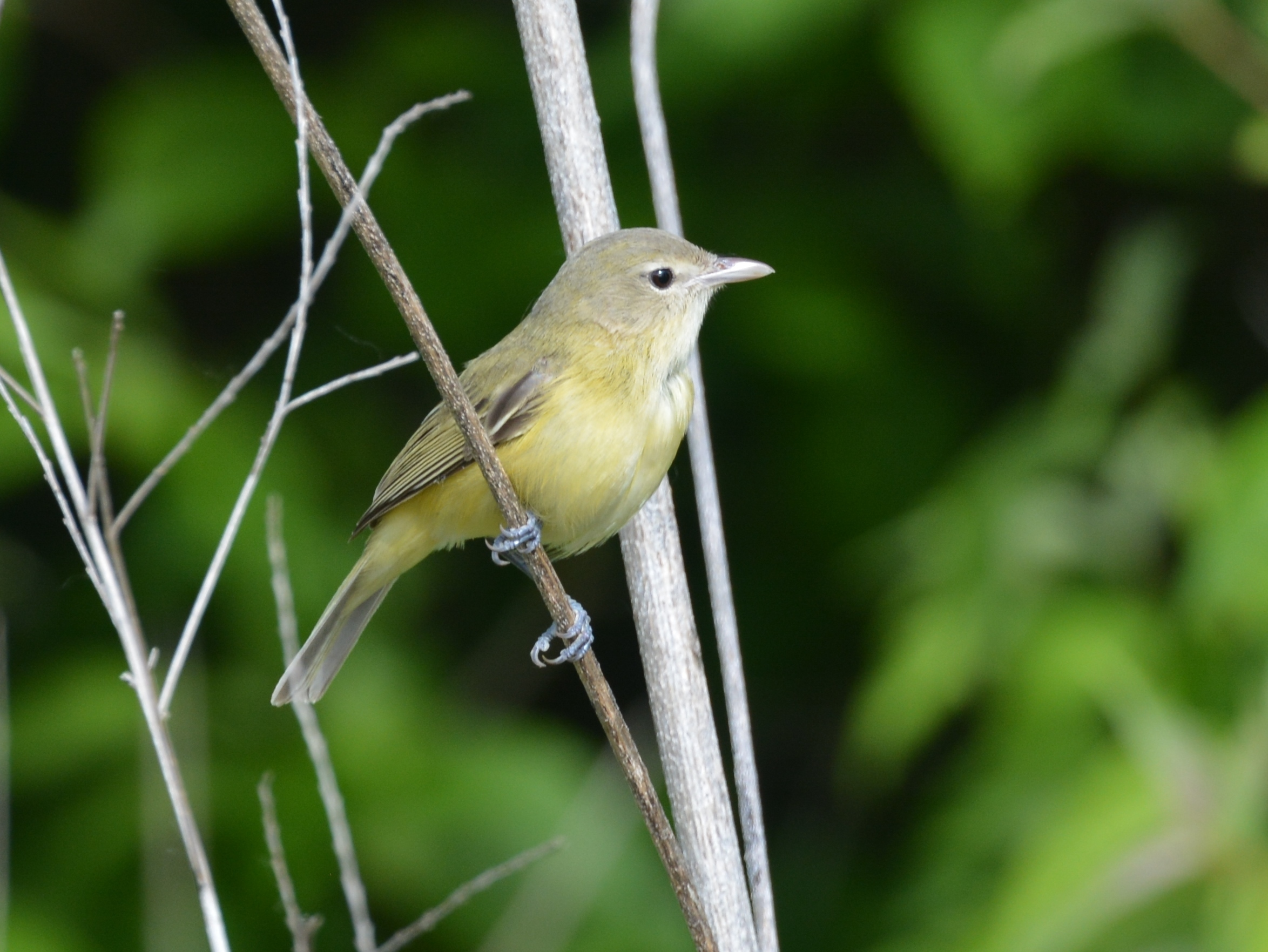

Conservation status
- Least Concern (IUCN 3.1)

Scientific classification
- Kingdom: Animalia
- Phylum: Chordata
- Class: Aves
- Order: Passeriformes
- Family: Vireonidae
- Genus: Vireo
- Species: V. bellii

Binomial name
- Vireo bellii Audubon, 1844

= Bell's vireo =

Species of bird

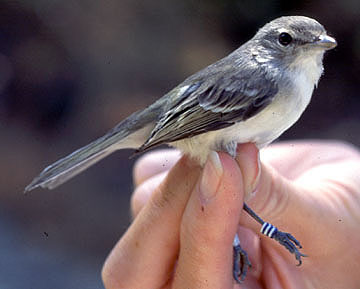
Least Bell's vireo with leg band, grasped in human hand.

Bell's vireo (Vireo bellii) is a songbird that migrates between a breeding range in Western North America and a winter range in Central America. It is dull olive-gray above and whitish below. It has a faint white eye ring and faint wing bars.

This bird was named by Audubon for John Graham Bell, who accompanied him on his trip up the Missouri River in the 1840s.

The least Bell's vireo (Vireo bellii pusillus) is an endangered subspecies in Southern California. Consideration of Bell's vireo has been a factor in several land development projects, to protect least Bell's vireo habitat. The decline of the least Bell's vireo is mostly due to a loss of riparian habitat.

== Description ==
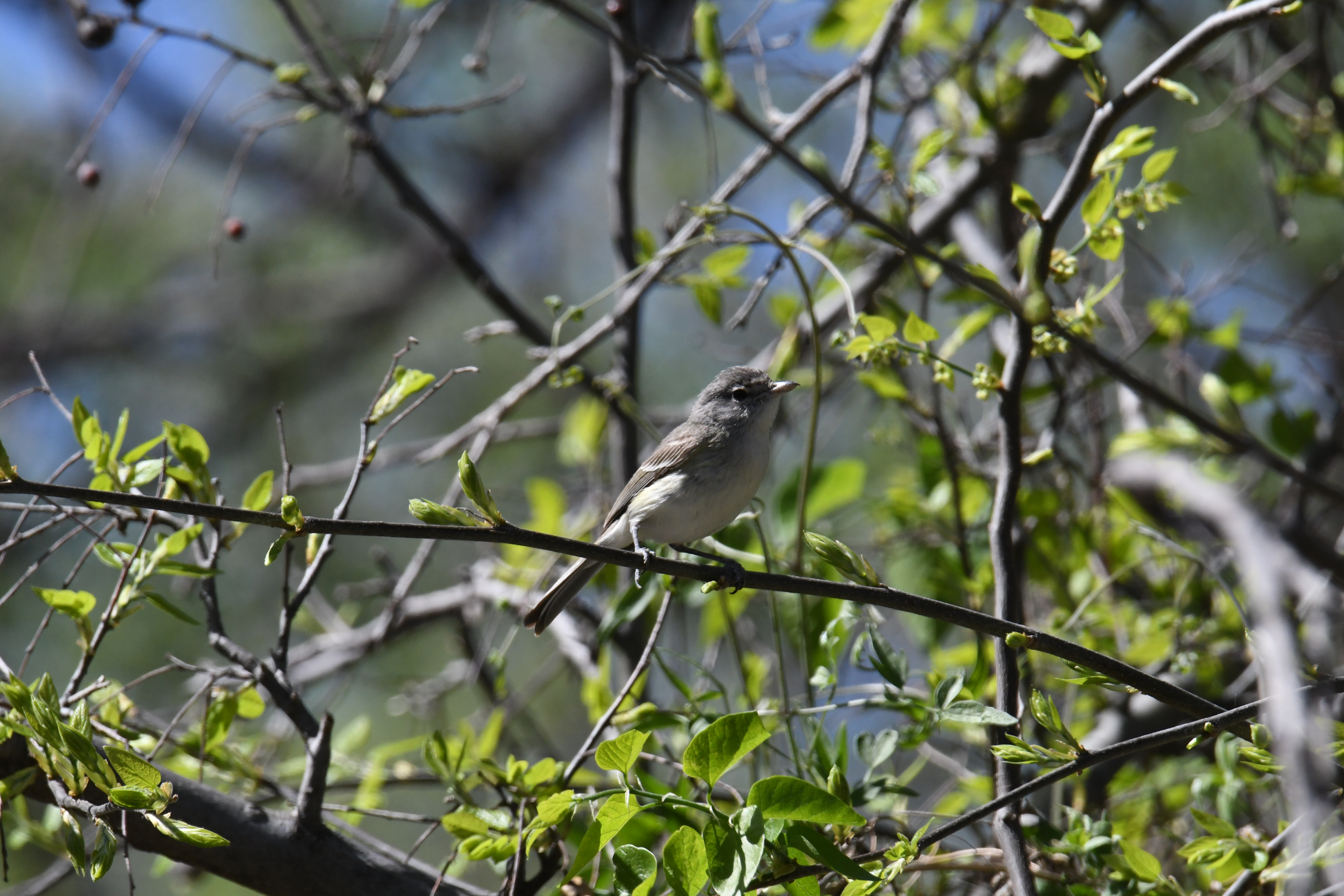
V. b. arizonae

Measurements:

- Length: 4.5–4.9 in (11.5–12.5 cm)
- Weight: 0.3–0.3 oz (7.4–9.8 g)
- Wingspan: 6.7–7.5 in (17–19 cm)

== Subspecies ==
- Least Bell's vireo, V.b. pusillus (southern California)
- Arizona Bell's vireo, V.b. arizonae (southwestern United States, northern Mexico)
- V.b. medius (southwestern Texas, Mexico)
- V.b. belli (central and midwestern United States to central Mexico)

== Behavior and ecology ==
In its breeding range, Bell's vireo often uses dense shrubbery in riparian areas or otherwise near water. Willow trees (Salix spp.) are a favored nesting species for all four subspecies of Bell's vireo, though in western areas mesquite and seep-willow (Baccharis salicifolia) are frequently used.

Bell's vireos construct a hanging nest suspended between the ends of low tree branches. Bell's vireo nests are often parasitized by brown-headed cowbirds, reducing overall nest success; however, one California study found that vireo nests in upland habitat are parasitized less than those in river-adjacent riparian habitat.

=== California subspecies ===
Historically, the least Bell's vireo was a common to locally abundant species in lowland riparian habitat, ranging from coastal southern California through the Sacramento and San Joaquin Valleys as far north as Red Bluff in Tehama County. Populations also occurred in the foothill streams of the Sierra Nevada and Coast Ranges, and in Owens Valley, Death Valley, and scattered locations in the Mojave Desert. Least Bell's vireos winter in Baja California Peninsula. Unlike during the breeding season, they are not limited in winter to willow-dominated riparian areas, but occupy a variety of habitats including mesquite scrub within arroyos, palm groves, and hedgerows bordering agricultural and residential areas. At the time of endangered species listing by the U.S. Fish and Wildlife Service in 1986, it had been extirpated from most of its historic range, and numbered just 300 pairs statewide. Populations were confined to eight counties south of Santa Barbara, with the majority of birds occurring in San Diego County. In the decade since listing, least Bell's vireo numbers have increased six-fold, and the species is expanding into its historic range. In 1998, the population size was estimated at 2,000 pairs. Nesting least Bell's vireos have recolonized the Santa Clara River in Ventura County, where 67 pairs nested in 1998, and the Mojave River in San Bernardino County. The northernmost reported sightings in recent years is of a nesting pair of least Bell's vireos near Gilroy in Santa Clara County in 1997 and in the upper Carneros Creek watershed east of Highway 101 in northern Monterey County in 2001. Roughly half of the current least Bell's vireo population occurs on drainages within Marine Corps Base Camp Pendleton in San Diego County, particularly in the lower Santa Margarita River.
