= Zmudowski State Beach =

State beach in Monterey and Santa Cruz counties, California, United States

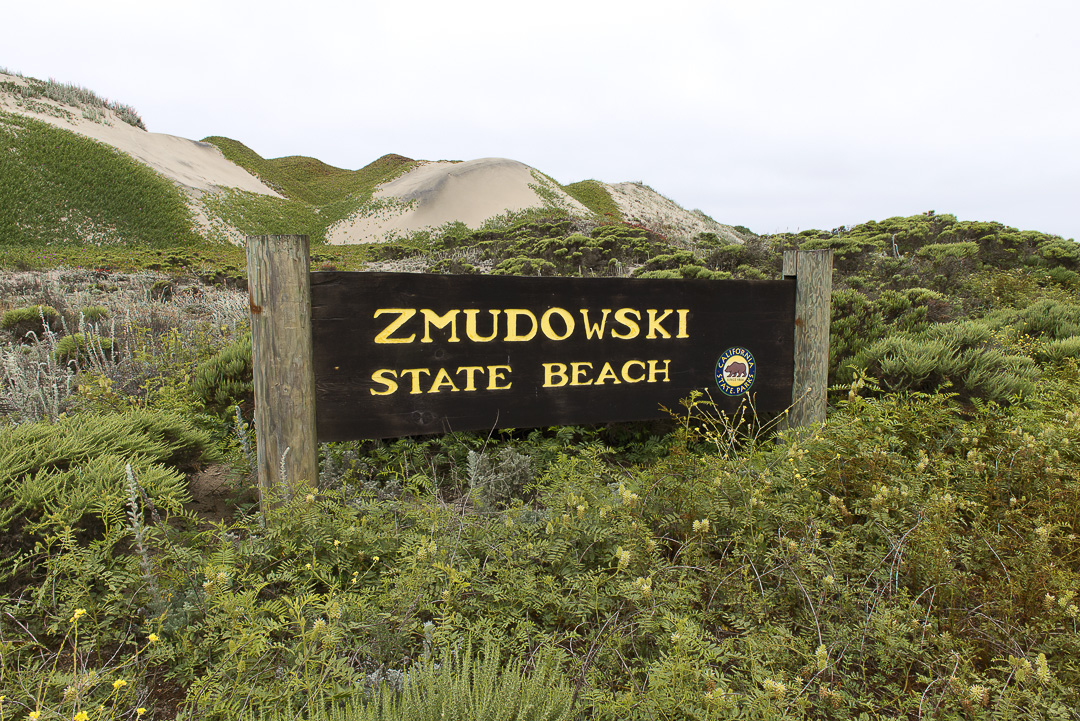
- Zmudowski State Beach

- Location within California Location within the United States
- Location: Monterey County, United States
- Nearest city: Moss Landing
- Coordinates: 36°50′36″N 121°48′17″W
- Governing body: California Department of Parks and Recreation

Zmudowski State Beach is located on Monterey Bay, in Moss Landing, Monterey County, northern California.

It is operated by the California Department of Parks and Recreation. Coastal erosion has greatly affected Zmudowski State Beach, along with other beaches in California. It has also been impacted by an influx of marine debris, causing changes in its wildlife populations.

== Recreation ==
Zmudowski State Beach is a popular fishing area and tourist attraction. Some of the fish found in this location are the perch, kingfish, sole, flounder, halibut, bocaccio (tomcod), jacksmelt, lingcod, cabezon, salmon, steelhead, and occasional rockfish. The beach features the Pajaro River estuary, where a natural preserve has been set aside for nature and wildlife exploring. Families go to this state beach to picnic and use the beach area. The sandy beach is also popular with bird watchers and equestrians. Horses are only allowed near the waterline. Swimming and water sports such as surfing are hazardous because of strong rip-currents.

The beach is located 20 miles northwest of Monterey, off Highway 1. It is accessible via Giberson Road, a two-mile narrow road through agricultural fields.

== History ==
The beach is named after Watsonville schoolteacher Mary Zmudowski, who donated it to the State of California in the 1950s. It is pronounced "zhmud-UV-ski." The state of California obtained a 155-acre parcel from Mary Zmudowski in 1950, which included 9,124 feet of land beside the ocean. The Park Commission changed the name of the park from "Pajaro River" to Zmudowski in 1952 in order to recognize the contribution the family made. This beach has always been a secret attraction to the Monterey Area. People from all over can come to participate in recreational activities.

== Geography ==
Because of the location of Zmudowski State Beach, in Moss Landing, coastal upwelling plays a large part on the beach in the spring and summer. Winds from the north, along the coast blow south past Monterey, causing the surface water to be pushed away, and the water from underneath to rise, or "upwell," and replace the surface water with nutrient rich water. This is why Zmudowski State Beach is such a great place to fish—the water has high biological productivity. Upwelling has fluctuated significantly in the past two decades, effecting the fishing and wildlife at Zmudowski State Beach. The strong spring and summer upwellings have brought much plankton and a variety of fishes.

== Wildlife ==
The water upwelling at Zmudowski State Beach has affected wildlife, particularly the fish population. Certain nutrients from the water rise to the surface, and stimulate high plankton productivity of the Monterey Bay region. The high nutrient content, salinity and density make this area attractive to anglers, year-round. Accordingly, Zmudowski State Beach is ranked a three star as a popular fishing destination. However, there have been laws and regulations set up to protect the fish population so on a daily basis, one can catch only 20 fish in combination of all other species, with not more than 10 fish of one species.

== Coastal erosion ==
Coastal erosion has greatly impacted Zmudowski State Beach, and poses many threats to the structure and to the community of the beach. Erosion rates along the southern Monterey Bay shoreline between Moss Landing and Wharf II in Monterey are the highest in California. Unfortunately, the Zmudowski State Beach is diminishing about 2 feet per year. Rules governing proper techniques when building near the beach have been put in place in order to minimize damage from coastal erosion.

== Pajaro River estuary ==
Zmudowski State Beach also features the Pajaro River estuary, where a nature preserve exists. An estuary is quite simply a body of water formed where freshwater from rivers and streams flows into the ocean, mixing with the seawater. Estuaries and tidal wetland systems are some of the most productive and adaptive of Earth’s ecosystems. This area surrounding the beach is a tidal wetland, but back 10,000 years ago it was not. The rising sea levels drowned the valley. Thousands of years later, sediment deposition transformed this area into an estuary. The transformation of the land into wetland and marsh actually began after the California Gold Rush.

When the Americans arrived, they cut down many trees to clear the land, and sediment continued to transform the wetland. Between 1870 and 1956, many levees were constructed within the Zmudowski Beach Region and near the Pajaro Estuary. The area, mostly salt marsh, decreased by 66% due to the levees. However, the benefit of salt marsh loss was the increase of four habitat types. When the early twentieth century came, more than 90 salt marshes were altered into habitats that man made ponds and marshes containing fresh water. In the mid-twentieth century the salt marshes continued to decline and were replaced with unvegetated mudflat. By the late 1950s, almost all the salt marshes left were drained and used for agriculture.

== 2014 closure proposal ==
In 2014, the State of California had planned to close 70 state parks to cut money from the State Park system budget. Zmudowski State Beach was saved from being cut because it required little money to maintain. In 2012, Governor Jerry Brown signed a bill that allowed $10 million to be used for the State Park system. This money was important for two Monterey County Parks, Zmudowski State Beach and Moss Landing State Beach, since they both received no donations.

== See also ==
- List of beaches in California
- List of California state parks
