= Rancho Santa Ana y Quien Sabe =

Mexican land grant in California

Coordinates: 36.820°N 121.220°W

Rancho Santa Ana y Quién Sabe was a 48,823-acre (197.58 km^{2}) Mexican land grant in present day San Benito County, California given in 1839 by Governor Juan B. Alvarado to Manuel Larios and Juan Maria Anzar. The grant, east of present day Hollister, consisted of the one square league Rancho Santa Ana in the Santa Ana Creek valley on the north, and the six square league Rancho Quién Sabe in the watershed of the upper Quién Sabe Creek in the Quién Sabe Valley on the south.

== History ==
Luis del Castillo Negrete (1798-1843) came to Alta California in 1834 as a member of the Híjar-Padrés Colony. He was an advisor to Governor Mariano Chico, and returned to Mexico in 1836. His brother, Francisco Javier del Castillo Negrete, received the six square league Rancho Quién Sabe in 1836 from Governor Nicolás Gutiérrez.

In 1839, the land was re-granted by Governor Alvarado to Manuel Larios and Juan Miguel Anzar. Anzar paid Larios to oversee the property. In 1848 the two men agreed to divide the grant; Larios took Rancho Santa Ana, and Anzar took Rancho Quién Sabe. Later, when title to the land was being determined, the courts ruled that Anzar and Larios owned equal shares.

=== Manuel Salvador Larios ===
Manuel Salvador Larios (1798–1865) was married three times; first to María Antonia del Carmen Pacheco, then secondly to Guadalupe Castro, and thirdly to María Rosario Armas de Higuera (who had been married to Juan José Saturio Higuera (1801– 1845)). When Larios died in 1865, his two surviving minor children were Martín del Patricinio (his mother was María Pacheco) and Estolano (his mother was Rosario Armas). Rosario Armas de Larios, with her son, Estolano Larios, and her Higuera children from a previous marriage moved to New Idria

=== Juan Maria (Miguel) Anzar ===
Juan Miguel Anzar was the brother of padre José Antonio Anzar (1792-) who served at the Mission San Juan Bautista until he returned to Mexico in 1835. Juan Maria (Miguel) Anzar was the grantee of Rancho Los Aromitas y Agua Caliente in 1835. Juan Maria (Miguel) Anzar (-1852) married María Antonia Castro. When Juan Maria (Miguel) Anzar died in 1853, he held title to Rancho Los Aromitas y Agua Caliente, Rancho Santa Ana y Quién Sabe, Rancho Real de los Águilas and Rancho Los Carneros. His widow, María Antonia Castro de Anzar, married Frederick A. McDougall (a doctor from Scotland). María Antonia Castro de Anzar de MacDougall died in 1855, leaving McDougal and her children (Anatolio Anzar, Juan Francisco Anzar and Policronio Anzar) as heirs.

=== Post-statehood ===
With the cession of California to the United States following the Mexican-American War, the 1848 Treaty of Guadalupe Hidalgo provided that the land grants would be honored. As required by the Land Act of 1851, a claim for Rancho Santa Ana y Quién Sabe was filed with the Public Land Commission in 1852, and the combined grant was patented to Manuel Larios and Juan Miguel Anzar in 1860.

A claim based on the Nicolás Gutiérrez grant of six square leagues to Luis del Castillo Negrete, was filed by Josefa Morales del Castillo Negrete with the Land Commission in 1852, but was rejected. A claim based on the Nicolás Gutiérrez grant of six square leagues to Francisco Javier del Castillo Negrete filed by Francisco Castillo Negrete with the Land Commission in 1852 was also rejected.

In 1866, the heirs of Manuel Larios sold 23,000 acres (93 km^{2}) of Rancho Santa Ana y Quién Sabe to Joaquín Bolado (1822–1894) and his business partner José G. Arques.

In 1869, Juan Francisco Anzar sold Rancho Santa Ana and Quién Sabe to Estanislao Hernández (1821–1893).

The Quién Sabe Ranch was purchased by John N. Irwin II from the Somavia family in the 1970s.

== See also ==
- Ranchos of California
- List of Ranchos of California
