= Rancho Real de los Aguilas =

Mexican land grant in California

Coordinates: 36.730°N 121.080°W

Rancho Real de los Águilas (also "Rancho Real de las Águilas" or "Rancho Real de los Aquilas") was a 31,052-acre (125.66 km^{2}) Mexican land grant in present day San Benito County, California given in 1844 by Governor Manuel Micheltorena to Francisco Arias and Saturnino Carriaga. The name means "rancho royal of the eagles". The grant was south of Rancho Santa Ana y Quién Sabe and extended along Las Águilas Creek.

== History ==
The seven square league Rancho Real de los Águilas was granted to Francisco Arias and Saturnino Carriaga (1816-).

Juan Miguel Anzar was the brother of padre José Antonio Anzar (1792-) who served at the Mission San Juan Bautista until he returned to Mexico in 1835. Juan Miguel Anzar (-1852) married María Antonia Castro. When Juan Miguel Anzar died in 1853, he held title to Rancho Los Aromitas y Agua Caliente, Rancho Santa Ana y Quién Sabe, Rancho Los Carneros and Rancho Real de los Águilas. His widow, María Antonia Castro de Anzar, married Frederick A. McDougall (a doctor from Scotland). María Antonia Castro de Anzar de MacDougall died in 1855, leaving McDougal and her children (Anatolio Anzar, Juan Francisco Anzar and Policronio Anzar) as heirs.

With the cession of California to the United States following the Mexican-American War, the 1848 Treaty of Guadalupe Hidalgo provided that the land grants would be honored. As required by the Land Act of 1851, a claim for Rancho Real de los Águilas was filed with the Public Land Commission in 1853, and the grant was patented to Frederick A. MacDougall, Anatolio Anzar, Juan Francisco Anzar and Policronio Anzar in 1869.

In 1869, Juan Francisco Anzar sold Rancho Real de los Águilas to Estanislao Hernández (1821-1893).

== See also ==
- Ranchos of California
- List of Ranchos of California
