= Rancho Cañada de la Carpenteria =

Mexican land grant in California

Coordinates: 36.850°N 121.650°W

Rancho Cañada de la Carpenteria was a 2,236-acre (9.05 km^{2}) Mexican land grant in present day Monterey County, California given in 1835 by Governor José Castro to Joaquín Soto. The name means valley of the carpenter's shop. The grant was near the San Benito County, California line, in hilly terrain north of Rancho Los Carneros and encompassed the former settlement of Dunbarton.

== History ==
The one-half square league Rancho Cañada de la Carpenteria was granted to Joaquín Soto in 1835.

With the cession of California to the United States following the Mexican-American War, the 1848 Treaty of Guadalupe Hidalgo provided that the land grants would be honored. As required by the Land Act of 1851, a claim for Rancho Cañada de la Carpenteria was filed with the Public Land Commission in 1853 and the grant was patented to Joaquín Soto in 1873.
