= Rancho Los Carneros =

1842 Mexican land grant

Coordinates: 36.830°N 121.620°W

Rancho Los Carneros was a 1,629-acre (6.59 km^{2}) Mexican land grant in present day Monterey County, California given in 1842 by Governor Juan B. Alvarado to María Antonia Linares. The name means "sheep". The grant was near the San Benito County, California line and south of Rancho Cañada de la Carpenteria.

== History ==
Juan Miguel Anzar was the brother of padre Jose Antonio Anzar (b. 1792) who served at the Mission San Juan Bautista until he returned to Mexico in 1835. Juan Miguel Anzar (d. 1852) married Maria Antonia Castro. When Juan Miguel Anzar died in 1853, he held title to Rancho Los Aromitas y Agua Caliente, Rancho Santa Ana y Quien Sabe, Rancho Real de los Aguilas and Rancho Los Carneros. His widow, Maria Antonia Castro de Anzar, married Frederick A. McDougall (a doctor from Scotland). Maria Antonia Castro de Anzar de MacDougall died in 1855, leaving McDougall and her children (Anatolio Anzar, Juan Francisco Anzar and Policronio Anzar) as heirs.

With the cession of California to the United States following the Mexican-American War, the 1848 Treaty of Guadalupe Hidalgo provided that the land grants would be honored. As required by the Land Act of 1851, a claim for Rancho Los Carneros was filed with the Public Land Commission in 1853, and the grant was patented to Frederick A. MacDougall, Anatolio Anzar, Juan Francisco Anzar and Policronio Anzar in 1862.

== See also ==
- Ranchos of California
- List of Ranchos of California
