= Quién Sabe Creek =

Quién Sabe Creek is a tributary stream of Los Muertos Creek, in San Benito County, California. Los Muertos Creek is in turn tributary to Tres Pinos Creek and Tres Pinos to the San Benito River, itself tributary to the Pajaro River. Quien Sabe Creek's mouth is at an elevation of 1,470 feet (450 meters) at its confluence with Los Muertos Creek. Its source is at 36°54′40″N 121°12′55″W an elevation of 2,800 feet (850 meters) in the Diablo Range.
