= Moss Landing State Beach =

State park in California, United States

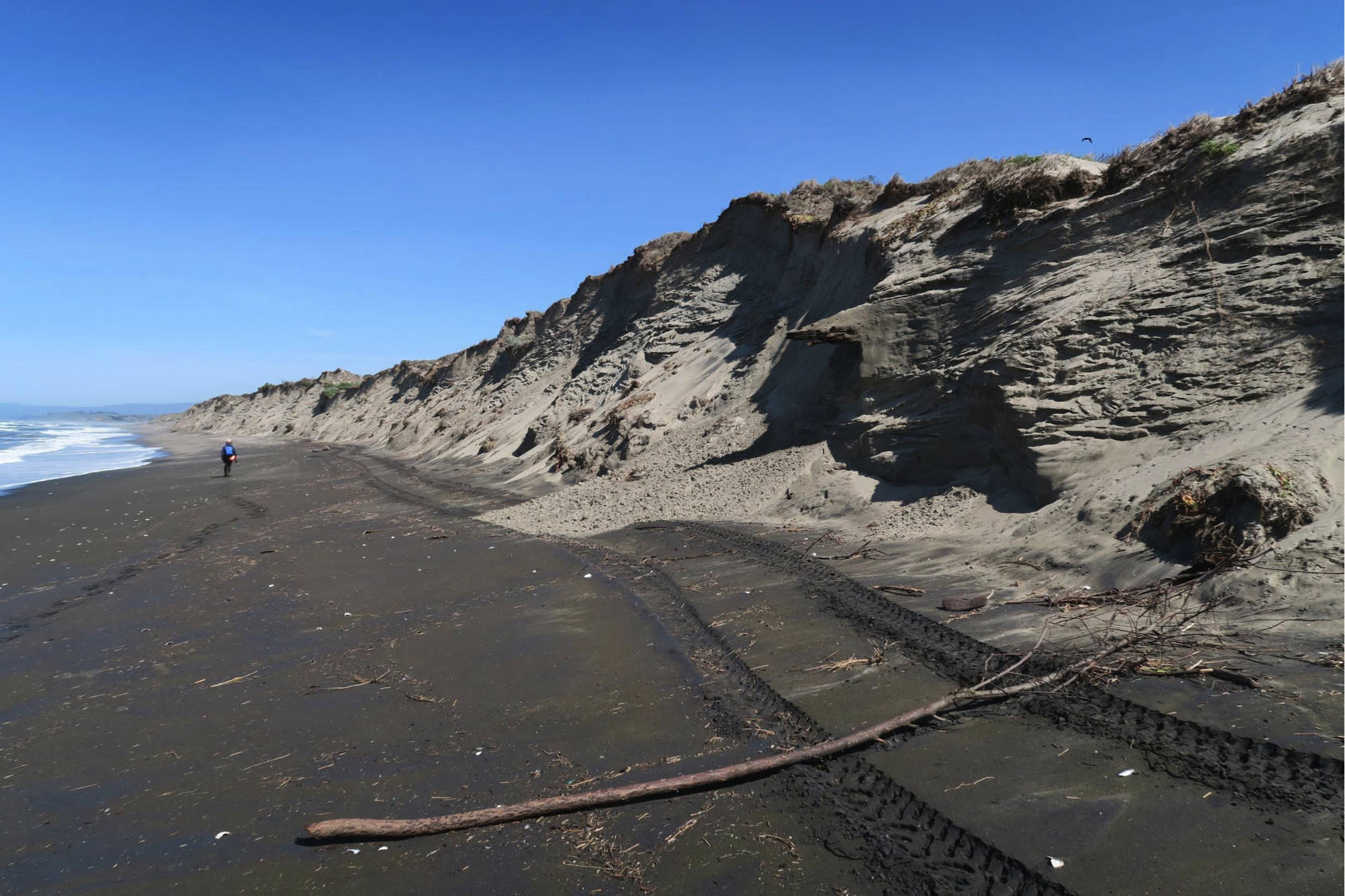
- Moss Landing State Beach

- Location within California Location within the United States
- Location: Monterey County, United States
- Nearest city: Monterey County
- Coordinates: 36°48′49″N 121°47′26″W
- Governing body: California Department of Parks and Recreation

Moss Landing State Beach is a state park on Monterey Bay, in Monterey County, California, United States.

== Description ==
The beach and park is about 16 miles (30 km) north of the city of Monterey via Highway 1, about 5 miles (8.0 km) south of Watsonville.

Among the most popular activities are offshore fishing, surfing, windsurfing and horseback riding. However, the strong rip currents make the water recreation (swimming, wading, etc.) dangerous. Moss Landing State Beach is also popular for picnicking because the dunes block out strong afternoon winds from blowing into the picnic area.

== Wildlife ==
Moss Landing State Beach has several bird-watching spots, but the type and number of birds can vary by season. Moss Landing Wildlife Area, with access to the east of Highway 1, has ponds that are controlled by tidal gates. They are a major roost for brown pelicans and also beneficial for shorebirds. Sea ducks, loons, grebes and gulls can also be easily spotted. Occasionally, there are special visitors such as Long-tailed Duck and Red-necked Grebe. Endangered species, the California Sea Otter, can be observed in the harbor channel with sometimes dozens in a raft.
