= Rancho Las Aromitas y Agua Caliente =

Mexican land grant in California

Coordinates: 36.890°N 121.600°W

Rancho Las Aromitas y Agua Caliente, commonly known as Rancho Las Aromas, was a 8,660-acre (35.0 km^{2}) Mexican land grant in present-day San Benito County, California given in 1835 by Governor José Castro to Juan Miguel Anzar. The name means "little perfumes and hot spring" and refers to nearby sulfur springs. The grant is close to the Santa Cruz County, California line and encompassed present-day Aromas.

== History ==
The three square league Rancho Las Aromitas y Agua Caliente was granted to Juan Maria (Miguel) Anzar in 1835. Juan Maria (Miguel) Anzar was the brother of padre Jose Antonio Anzar (1792-) who served at the Mission San Juan Bautista until he returned to Mexico in 1835. Juan Maria (Miguel) Anzar (-1852) married Maria Antonia Castro. When Juan Maria (Miguel) Anzar died in 1852, he held title to Rancho Aromitas y Agua Caliente, Rancho Santa Ana y Quien Sabe, Rancho Real de los Aguilas and Rancho Los Carneros. His widow, Maria Antonia Castro de Anzar, married Frederick A. MacDougall (a doctor from Scotland). Maria Antonia Castro de Anzar de MacDougall died May 30, 1855, leaving MacDougall and her children (Anatolio Anzar, Juan Francisco Anzar and Policronio Anzar) as heirs.

With the cession of California to the United States following the Mexican-American War, the 1848 Treaty of Guadalupe Hidalgo provided that the land grants would be honored. As required by the Land Act of 1851, a claim for Rancho Las Aromitas y Agua Caliente was filed with the Public Land Commission in 1852, and the grant was patented to Frederick A. MacDougall, Anatolio Anzar, Juan Francisco Anzar and Policronio Anzar in 1862.

== See also ==
- Ranchos of California
- List of Ranchos of California
