= Elkhorn Slough National Estuarine Research Reserve =

Facility in Watsonville, California, USA

Coordinates: 36.81697°N 121.73085°W

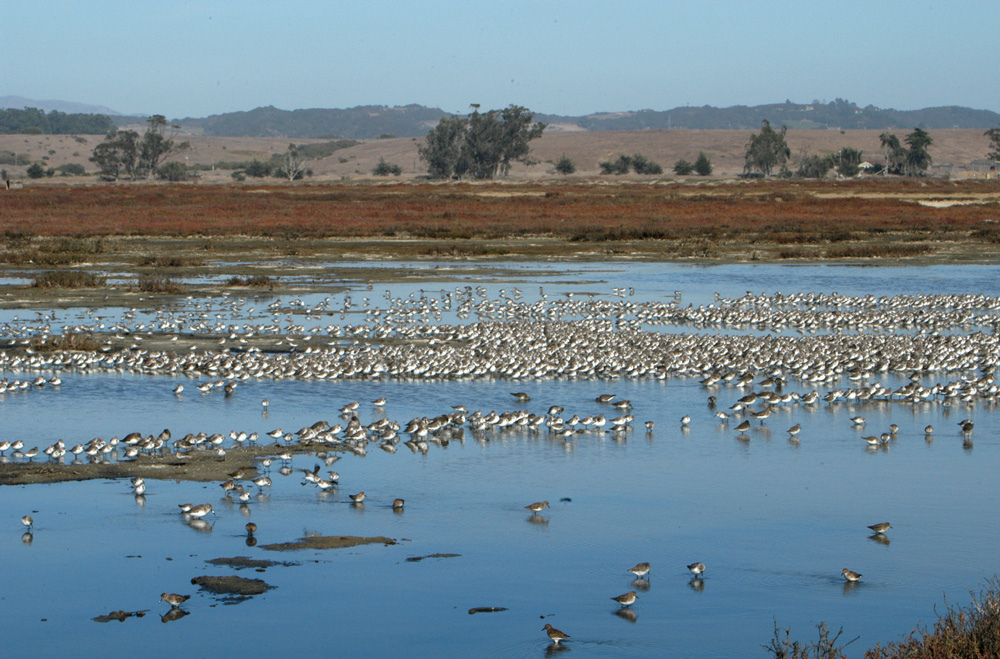
Elkhorn Slough marsh birds

The Elkhorn Slough National Estuarine Research Reserve is a nature reserve that is located at 1700 Elkhorn Road in Watsonville, California. The reserve encompasses the central shore of Monterey Bay and is approximately 100 miles (160 km) south of San Francisco, California. Part of the Elkhorn Slough, the reserve was established as a part of the National Oceanic and Atmospheric Administration and is being managed as the Elkhorn Slough Ecological Reserve through the California Department of Fish and Wildlife.

== Description ==
The mission of the 1,700-acre (6.9 km^{2}) Elkhorn Slough National Estuarine Research Reserve is to promote the environmental education, research, and protection of ecosystems found in Elkhorn Slough salt marsh along with the surrounding watershed. There are programs hosted that work towards conserving and protecting the wildlife and habitats in Elkhorn Slough, as part of the National Estuarine Research Reserve system.

=== Recreational and Educational Activities ===
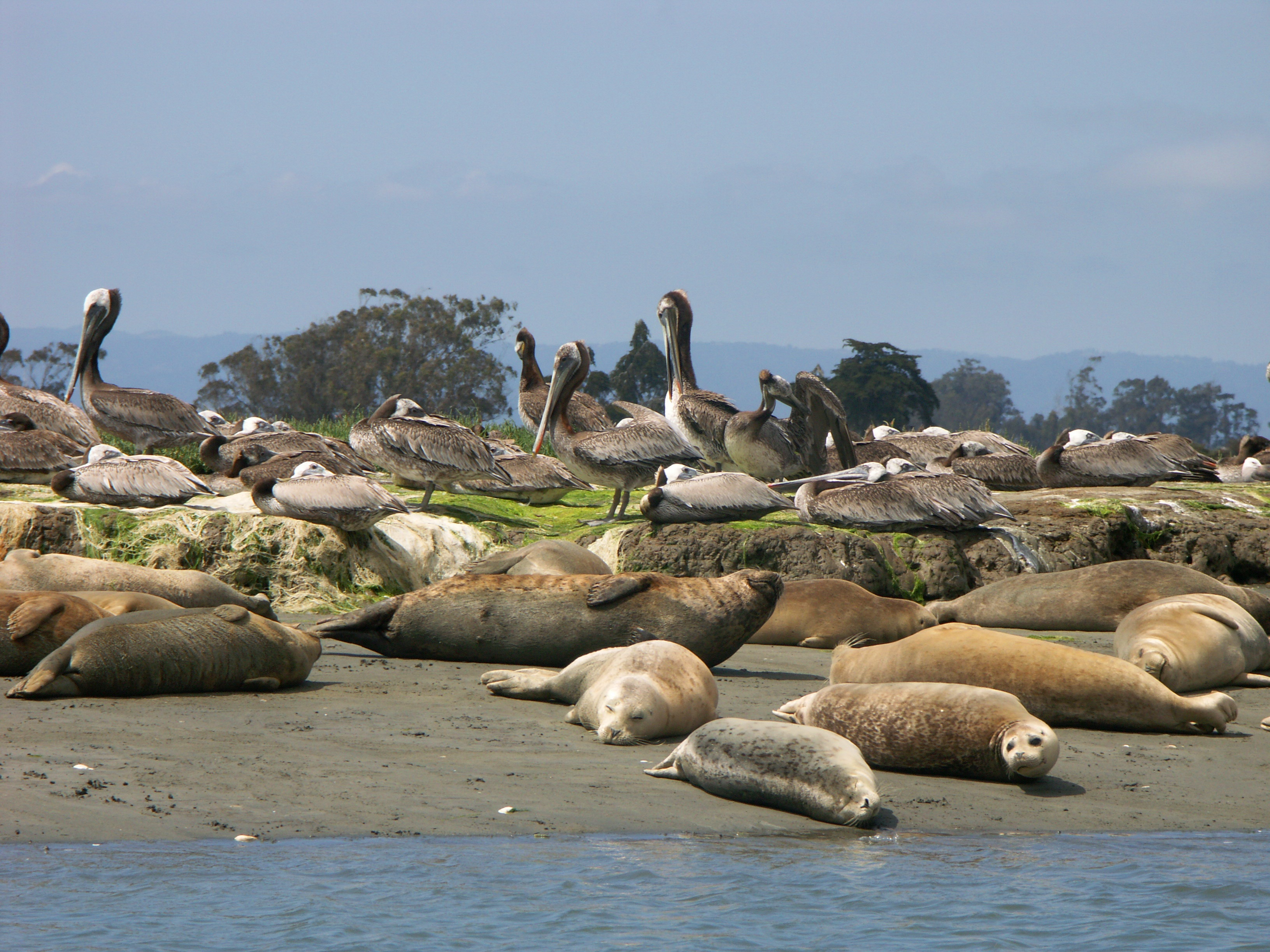
Elkhorn Slough harbor seals and brown pelicans

The visitor center features exhibits and five miles (8 km) of trails that offer a diverse variety of plants and animals to see. This reserve also serves as a spot for kayaking and birding as well, where visitors can be surrounded by seals, fish, sea otters, and marshes. The Elkhorn Slough also contains various species of leopard sharks, birds, and fish that are considered to be threatened habitats. Visitors can observe these forms of wildlife in the watershed while learning more about these rare estuarine communities.

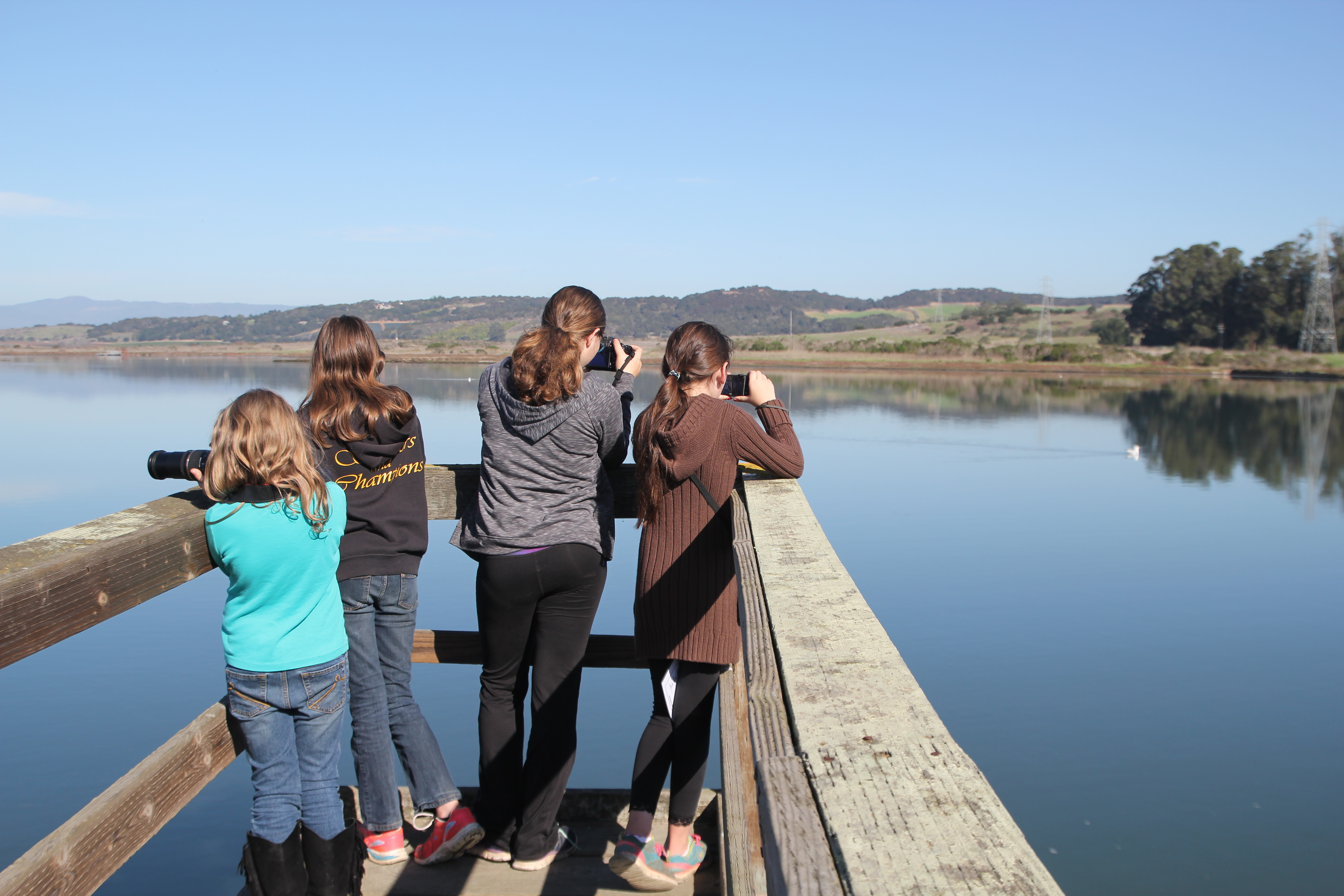
Students Observing Elkhorn Slough 2016

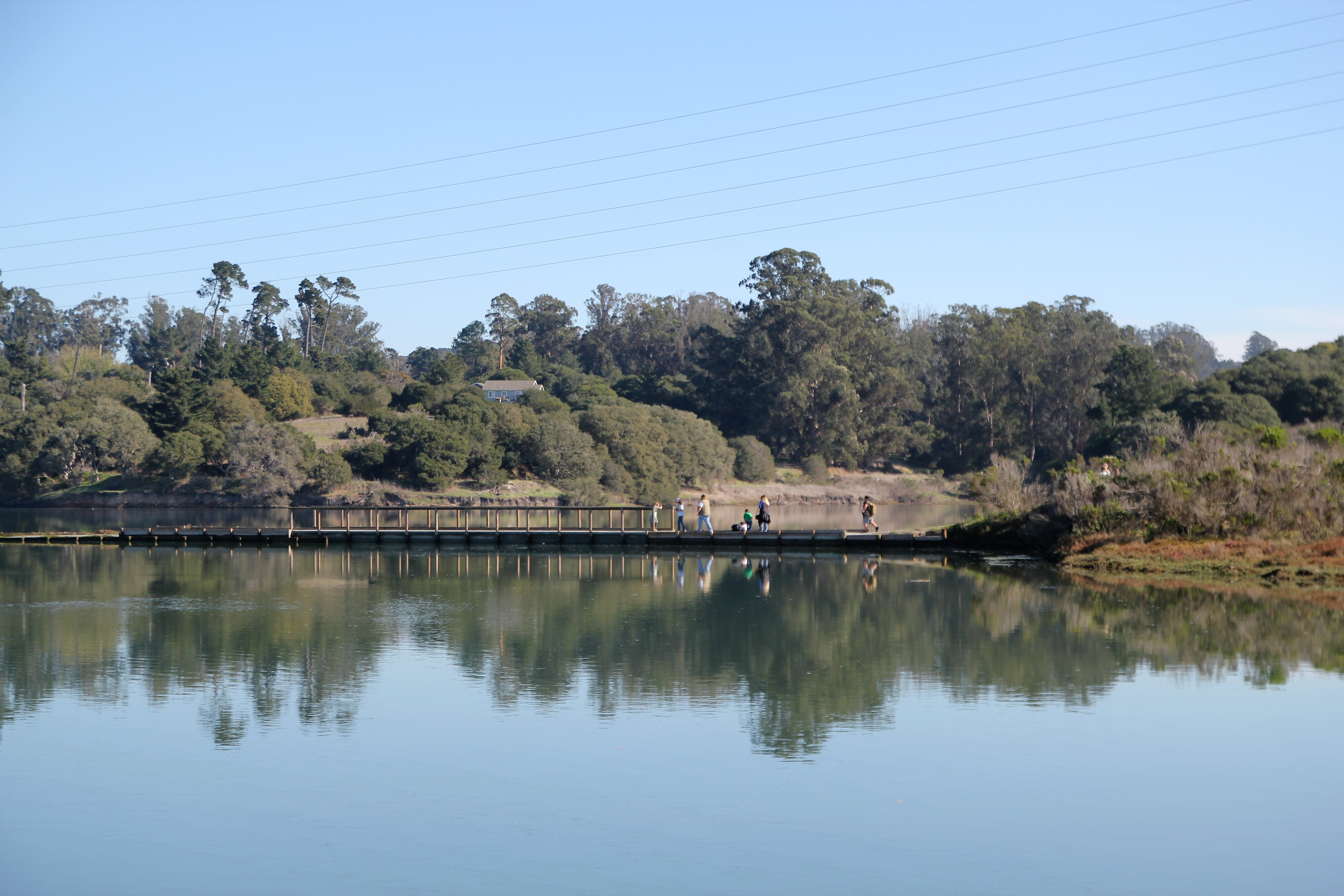
Pier at Elkhorn Slough 2016

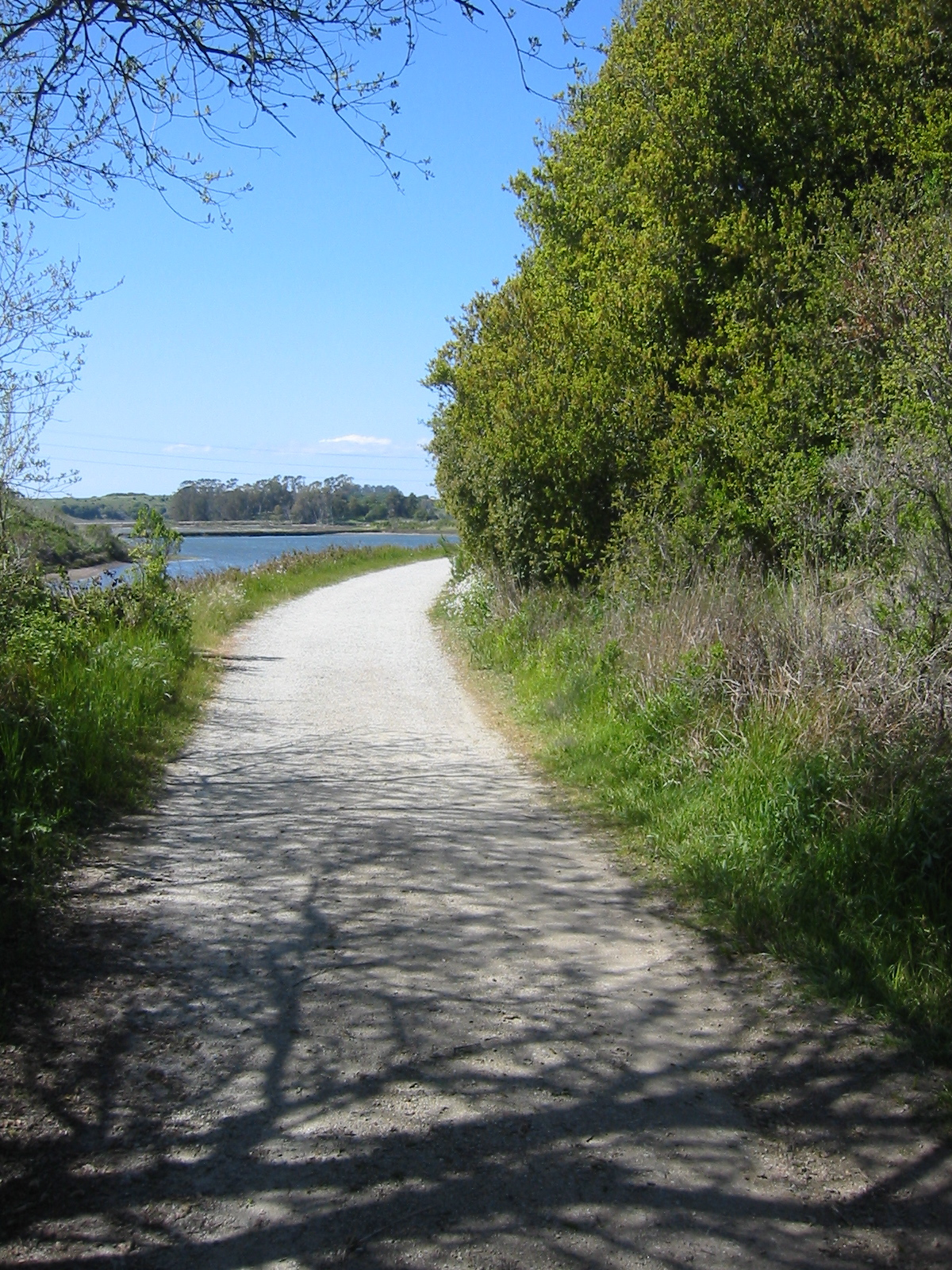
Trail at Elkhorn Slough 2008
