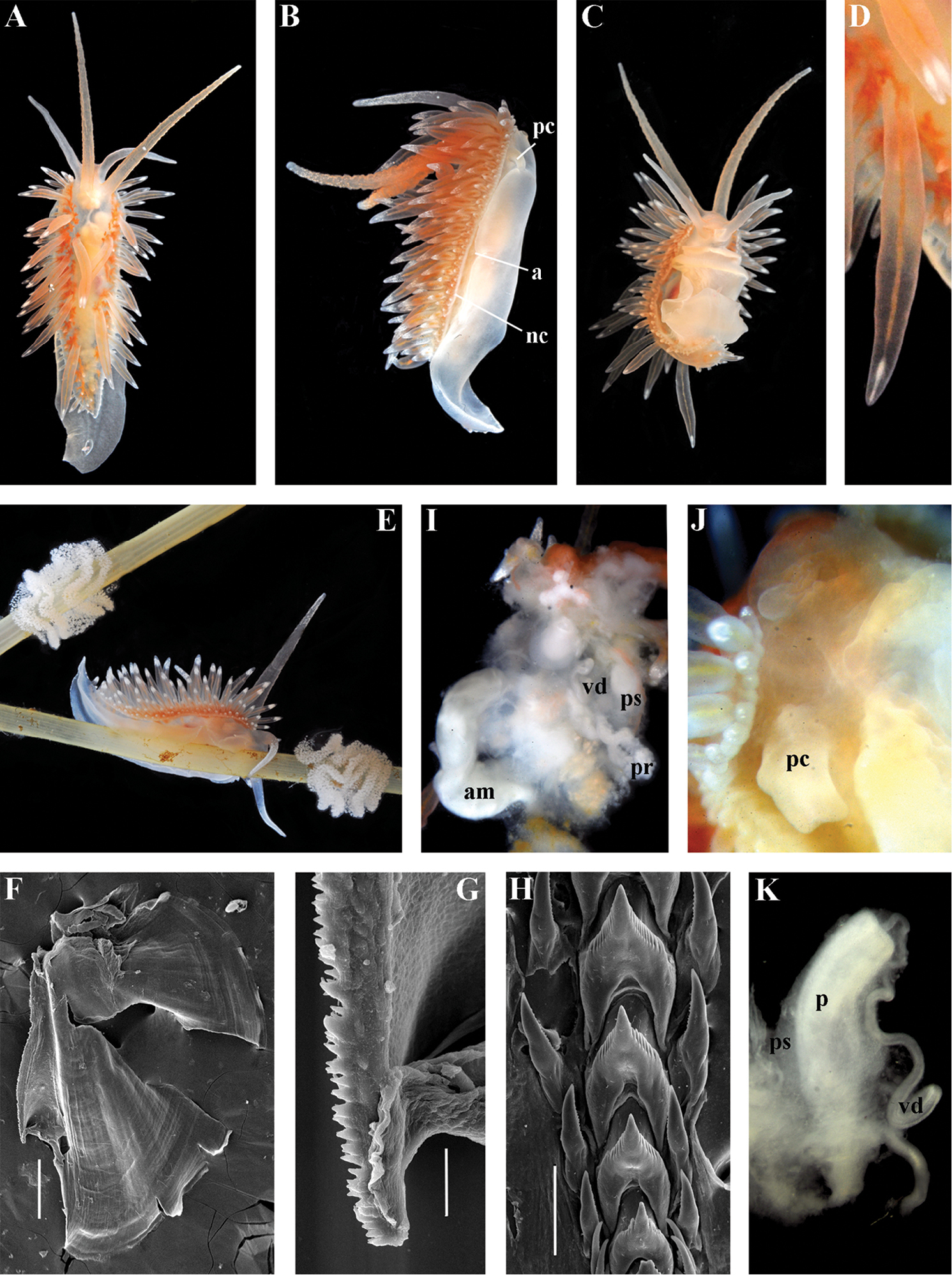
- Chlamylla intermedia

Scientific classification
- Kingdom: Animalia
- Phylum: Mollusca
- Class: Gastropoda
- Order: Nudibranchia
- Suborder: Aeolidacea
- Family: Paracoryphellidae
- Genus: Chlamylla; Bergh, 1886

Type species
- Chlamylla borealis Bergh, 1886

Synonyms
- Paracoryphella M. C. Miller, 1971; Polaria Korshunova, Martynov, Bakken, Evertsen, Fletcher, Mudianta, H. Saito, Lundin, Schrödl & Picton, 2017

= Chlamylla =

Genus of gastropods

Chlamylla is a genus of sea slugs, aeolid nudibranchs, marine gastropod mollusks in the family Paracoryphellidae.

== Species ==
Species within the genus Chlamylla according to Korshunova et al.:

- Chlamylla borealis Bergh, 1886
- Chlamylla intermedia (Bergh, 1899)

Species within the genus Chlamylla according to Ekimova et al. (2026):

- Chlamylla borealis Bergh, 1886
- Chlamylla ignicrystalla (Korshunova, Martynov, Bakken, Evertsen, Fletcher, Mudianta, H. Saito, Lundin, Schrödl & Picton, 2017) (=Paracoryphella ignicrystalla Korshunova, Martynov, Bakken, Evertsen, Fletcher, Mudianta, H. Saito, Lundin, Schrödl & Picton, 2017)
- Chlamylla intermedia (Bergh, 1899)
- Chlamylla islandica (Odhner, 1937) (=Paracoryphella islandica (Odhner, 1937))
- Chlamylla parva (M. Hadfield, 1963) (=Paracoryphella parva (M. Hadfield, 1963))
- Chlamylla polaris (Volodchenko, 1946) (=Polaria polaris (Volodchenko, 1946))

Synonymised species:

- Chlamylla atypica (Bergh, 1899) synonym of Chlamylla borealis borealis Bergh, 1886
