= Ziminella vrijenhoeki =

Scientific classification
- Kingdom: Animalia
- Phylum: Mollusca
- Class: Gastropoda
- Order: Nudibranchia
- Suborder: Aeolidacea
- Family: Flabellinidae
- Genus: Ziminella
- Species: Z. vrijenhoeki

Binomial name
- Ziminella vrijenhoeki Valdés, Lundsten & N. G. Wilson, 2018

Species of gastropod

Ziminella vrijenhoeki is a species of sea slug in the family Paracoryphellidae.

It was discovered at Monterey Canyon by MBARI researchers near a whale carcass 1000 meters below the surface, and was named after Robert Vrijenhoek, a MBARI evolutionary biologist. It is bright orange, and grows about 20 millimeters long.
