= Monterey Peninsula Water Project =

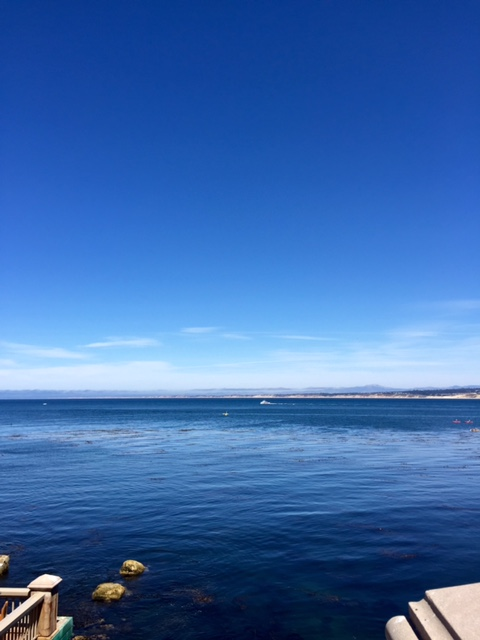
View of Monterey Bay at Cannery Row

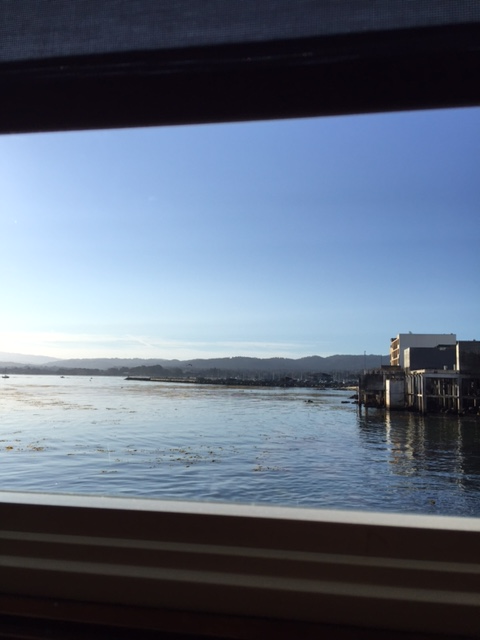
Monterey Bay from Monterey, California

The Monterey Peninsula Water Project (MWPW) is a water management project seeking to meet water demands of Monterey residents. The major water source for Monterey is powered by the Carmel River, which is precipitation influenced and does not receive water perennially. In addition to the Carmel River, the Seaside Groundwater Basin is the only other form of water supply. Both watersheds have been protected under stiff regulation to significantly reduce water diversion, especially the Carmel River which has been severely affected by California's drought. The MPWP is the proposed answer to help meet current and future water demands, while dealing with these reductions from the Carmel River and Seaside Groundwater Basin. The main features of this project will include a desalination plant, slant wells that will draw water from underneath the sea floor along the coastline, and a 10-mile pipeline extending through the north part of Monterey to supply water to its residents. The goal throughout the planning of this new infrastructure is to protect ocean wildlife, while excess brine will be handled by the area's water pollution control agency. The total cost of this project is estimated to be 322 million dollars with 79 million coming from subsurface intake, 115 million from the desalination plant, and 128 million from the pipelines. The MPWP is divided into three main aspects which include desalination, aquifer storage and recovery, and groundwater replenishment.

This project will involve multiple partnerships including the Monterey Peninsula Regional Water Authority (MPRWA), Monterey Regional Water Pollution Control Agency, Monterey Peninsula Water Management District (MPWMP), and a governance committee of representatives from local and state authority known as the California Public Utilities Commission (CPUC).

== Timeline ==
In April 2012, the application was submitted to the California Public Utilities Commission (CPUC) for approval. Later in 2012, environmental impact report (EIR) drafting and scoping took place in order to prepare for the writing of the draft EIR, which is currently pending for approval in April 2016. In 2015, wells were tested and contractors were hired for sourcing wells and new water facilities. The draft EIR is due in December 2016 as well as the approval of the State Water Resources Control Board (SWRCB). In February 2017, the last public review of the draft EIR takes place, along with the final being completed by September. Then the EIR and EIS are up for approval later in 2017, with the final Coastal Commission's decision on whether construction can begin in early 2018. The construction of the desalination plant and pipeline facilities are supposed to take place in 2018 and continuing into the next few years. Looking ahead to 2019 and 2020, the desalination plant is supposed to begin operations and supply water for Monterey's residents.

== Updates ==
In October 2015, a slant well was tested for feasibility and effectiveness. In the month of November 2015, Boart Longyear was selected to construct desalination plant slant wells. On December 21 of 2015, firms were chosen to build the proposed pipelines, which would provide water to over 100,000 residents. On January 12 of 2016, Castroville agreed to incorporate a desalination return water project, which would allow the city to gain approximately 800 acre feet of desalinized water from the MPWP to recharge its groundwater sources. Castroville suffers from salt water intrusion in their wells and have failed to meet water demands in recent years. A first quarter newsletter came out on April 29, 2016, which states that the MPWP will have a one-year delay on the environmental review process. Due to the proposed cutback schedule on water diversion from the Carmel River, the deadline to find alternative sources has been an issue that California Public Utilities Commission (CPUC) feels a one-year review is necessary.

== Objectives ==
One of the main objectives of the MPWP is to reduce and replace water supply from the Carmel River and Seaside Groundwater Basin. Both of these are under strict regulation and have specific criteria for the project to meet. Water diverted from the Seaside Water Basin is expected to decrease from approximately 4,000 acre feet per year to 1474 acre feet per year in relation to how much groundwater is naturally recharged in the future. The other stipulation required by regulation is to repay the basin by recharging its water source by an estimated 700 (acre feet per year) for approximately the next 25 years. The Carmel River however, has different regulations and objectives for the MPWP to meet. Not only is a significant reduction ordered, but the desalination plant for this project is expected to replace pumping from the Carmel River in its entirety. Surface water pumping is expected to reduce by 3,376 (acre feet per year), and groundwater extraction is also expected to decrease heavily. According to the Monterey Peninsula Water Management District, approximately 9,730 acre feet per year will be limited for California Water systems within the Monterey Peninsula.

California American Water (CalAM) is also involved in this project with a mandate to find to replacement water supply by December 2016, which relates back to the "replacement" statement in relation to water from the Carmel River of Seaside Basin. This project would also ensure that a reliable water supply will meet demands of customers throughout the Monterey area as well as sufficient water needs for tourists and future residents. In accordance to future population, a water capacity threshold will also be made to accommodate further water supply for the possibility of branching out into the greater Monterey region. Also, the goal of this project is to accomplish many of these water tasks in a safe, energy saving environment. The reduction of greenhouse emissions and energy use per unit of water is an important constituent in the MPWP.

The desalination plant is expected to produce high quantities of water, which will be about 9,750 acre feet per year, but pending the approval the water pollution agency treatment centers, and the MPWMD, Monterey Peninsula Water Management District's groundwater replenishment proposed project, the quantity could be reduced by 6,250 acre feet per year. The groundwater replenishment aspect of this project would recharge its supply and produce 3,500 feet every year due to advanced treatments for recycled water and the ability to reclaim that water for use. This would inadvertently reduce the amount of greenhouse gas emissions as well as energy used per unit of water.

Another important objective of this project is to revive the current aquifer recovery project that is happening. Since large decreases in water pumping are expected to take place, aquifers are going to be constructed in various parts along the Carmel River in order to capture the winter's precipitation for supply in drier seasons and months. To ensure water is collected efficiently and effectively, three wells will be constructed which is expected to produce 900 acre feet on an annual level.

Demand (Acre Feet Per Year)	
System Demand	13,291
PB Entitlements	325
Tourism Rebound	500
Lots of Record	1,180
Total	15,296

Supply (Acre Feet Per Year)	
Carmel River	3,376
Seaside Basin	774
ASR	1,300
Sand City Desalination Plant	94
Remaining In Accordance to Demand	9,752

== Desalination ==
The process of desalination transforms saltwater to freshwater through membrane-powered filters, in which salt and other toxicants are removed. The intensity of filtration generated from these membranes will result in freshwater that will need to be infused with minerals before coming potable for residents of Monterey. The slant wells associated in this project will direct ocean water into storage tanks equipped with reverse osmosis capability, allowing for removal of brine, suspended materials, and harmful bacteria. The remnants from filtered ocean water will be released back into the ocean with an appropriate level of salinity and overall water quality. This is to ensure the absence of negative environmental impacts from the desalination process.

The goal of the desalination plants is to relieve Monterey residents' water demand, while increasing supply. This process intends to create potable water opportunity for the greater Monterey region, while successfully meeting federal and state guidelines for drinking water.

== Impact on residents ==
All residents of the Monterey Peninsula are currently paying for water at an approximate rate of $97.27. With the introduction and implementation of the MPWP, customer rates are expected to increase due to the proposed water conservation infrastructure such as the desalination plant. In years past, customers have paid rates of $75.74 up to $88.72 according to California American Water. In 2018, rates may increase by about ten dollars. Although rates are expected to increase, newly-produced clean and sustainable water will become available from MPWP and the Monterey Water Recycle Project.

2013	2014	2015	2016	2017	2018
$75.74	$79.86	$88.42	$97.27	$97.38	$106.73
