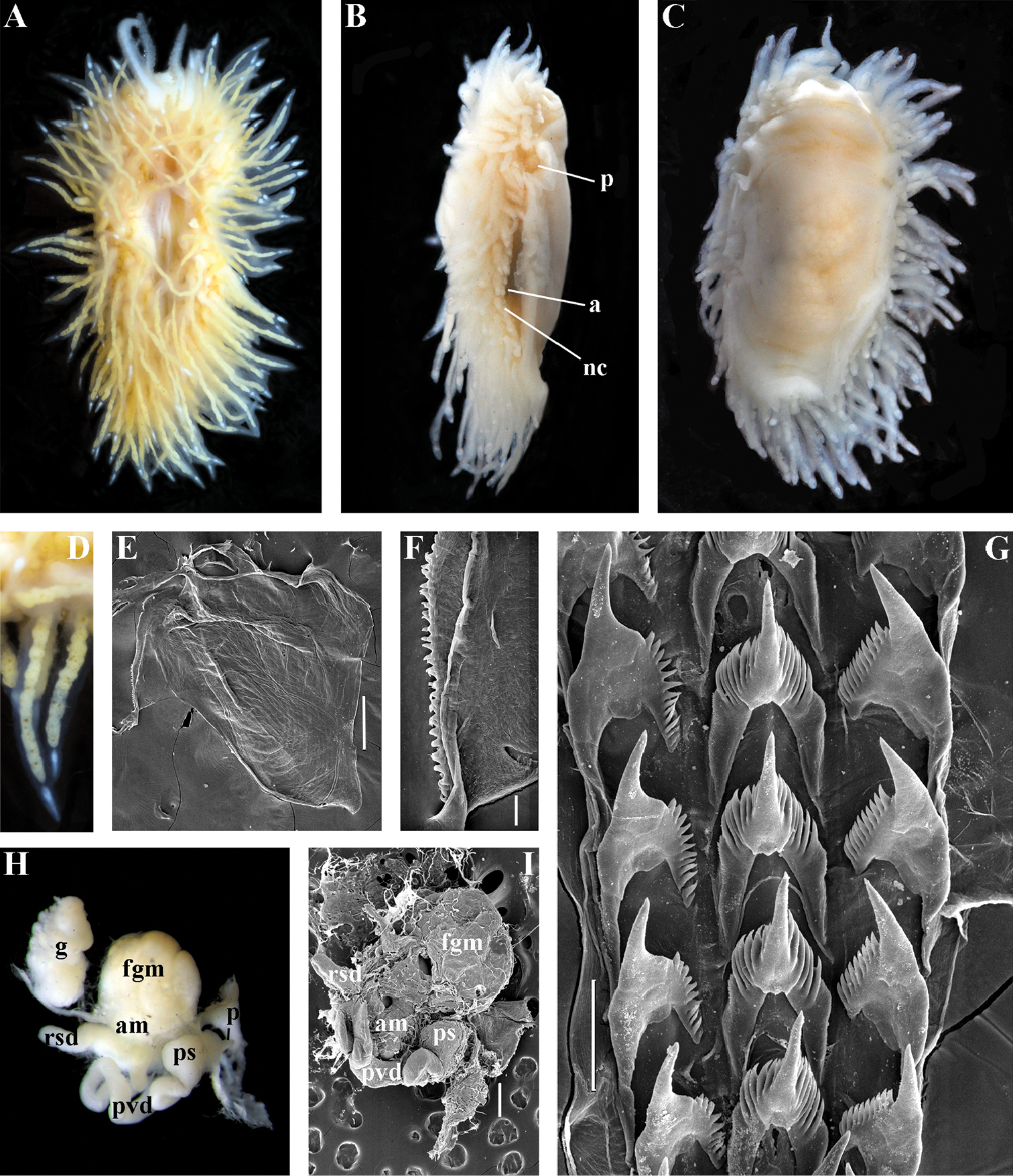

Scientific classification
- Kingdom: Animalia
- Phylum: Mollusca
- Class: Gastropoda
- Order: Nudibranchia
- Suborder: Aeolidacea
- Family: Paracoryphellidae
- Genus: Polaria; Korshunova, Martynov, Bakken, Evertsen, Fletcher, Mudianta, Saito, Lundin, Schrödl & Picton, 2017

= Polaria (gastropod) =

Genus of gastropods

Polaria is a genus of sea slugs, specifically aeolid nudibranchs, marine gastropod molluscs in the family Paracoryphellidae.

In Ekimova et al. (2026), Polaria was synonymized with Chlamylla, and Paracoryphellidae merged into Flabellinidae.

== Species ==
Species previously within the genus Polaria are as follows:

- Polaria polaris (Volodchenko, 1946)
