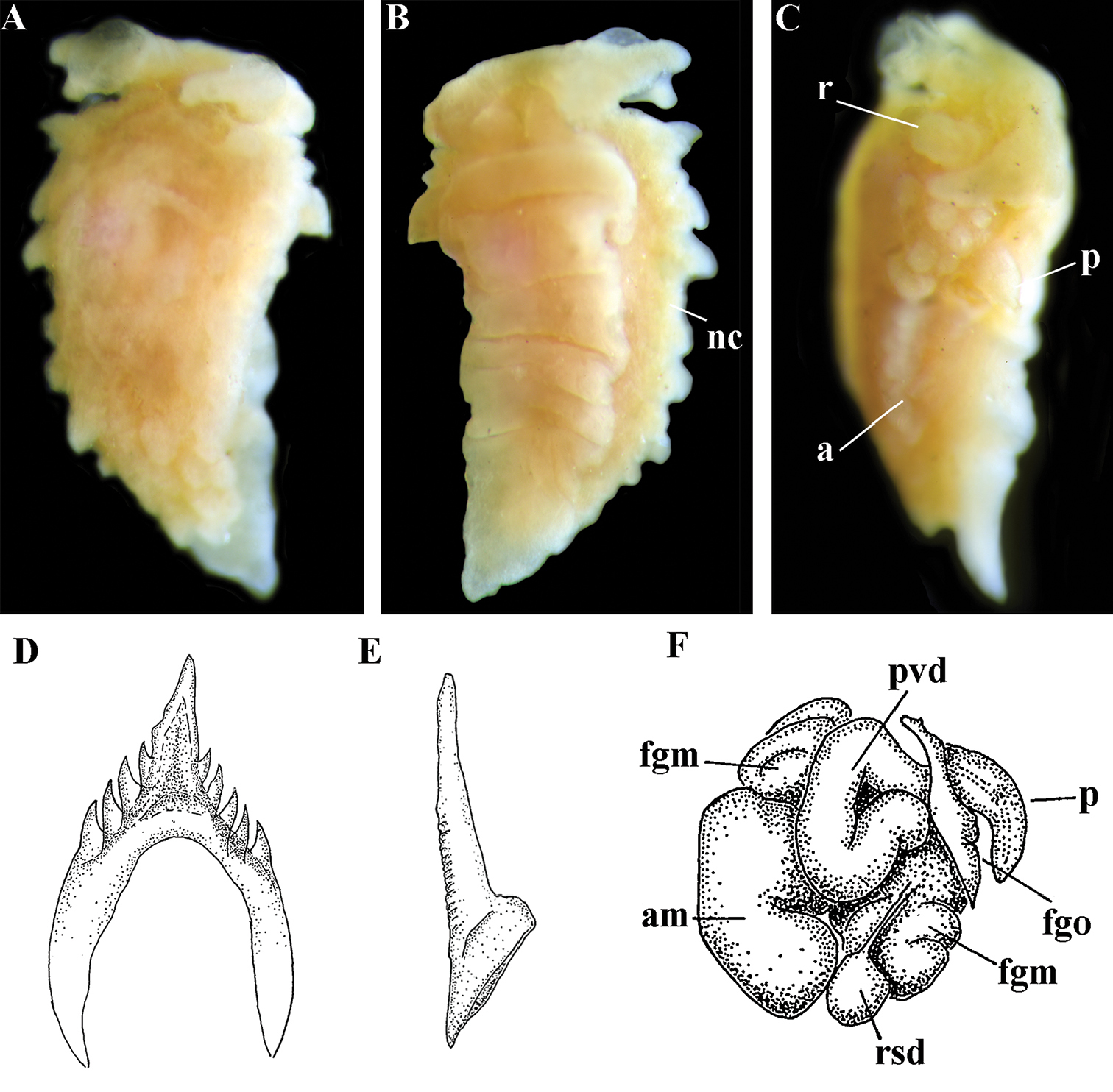

Scientific classification
- Kingdom: Animalia
- Phylum: Mollusca
- Class: Gastropoda
- Order: Nudibranchia
- Suborder: Aeolidacea
- Family: Paracoryphellidae
- Genus: Paracoryphella
- Species: P. parva

Binomial name
- Paracoryphella parva (Hadfield, 1963)

Synonyms
- Coryphella parva Hadfield, 1963

= Paracoryphella parva =

Flabellina parva

Species of gastropod

Paracoryphella parva is a species of sea slug, an aeolid nudibranch, a marine heterobranch mollusc in the family Paracoryphellidae.

== Distribution ==
This species was described from the Øresund, between Denmark and Sweden. It has not been reported since the original description.
