= Paracoryphella islandica =

Scientific classification
- Kingdom: Animalia
- Phylum: Mollusca
- Class: Gastropoda
- Order: Nudibranchia
- Suborder: Aeolidacea
- Family: Paracoryphellidae
- Genus: Paracoryphella
- Species: P. islandica

Binomial name
- Paracoryphella islandica (Odhner, 1937)

Synonyms
- Coryphella islandica Odhner, 1937; Flabellina islandica (Odhner, 1937)

Species of gastropod

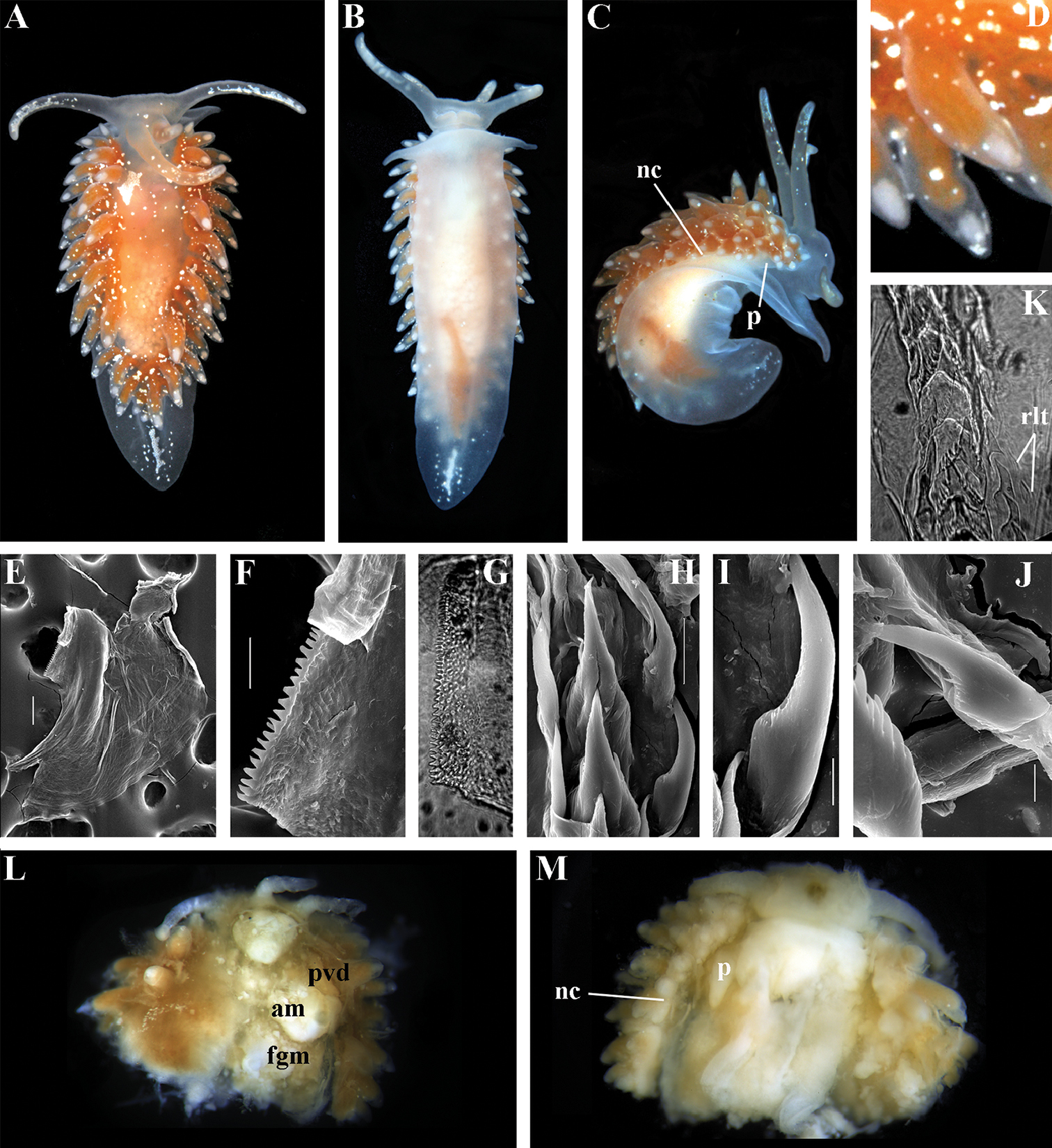
Paracoryphella islandica

Paracoryphella islandica is a species of sea slug, an aeolid nudibranch, a marine gastropod mollusk in the family Paracoryphellidae.

== History of the taxonomy ==
Paracoryphella islandica was originally described as Coryphella islandica by Nils Hjalmar Odhner in 1937. M. C. Miller (1971) assigned this species to a new genus Paracoryphella within a new family Paracoryphellidae. Gosliner & Kuzirian (1990) synonymized Paracoryphella with Flabellina, but Korshunova et al., 2017 reinstated Miller's genus and family.
