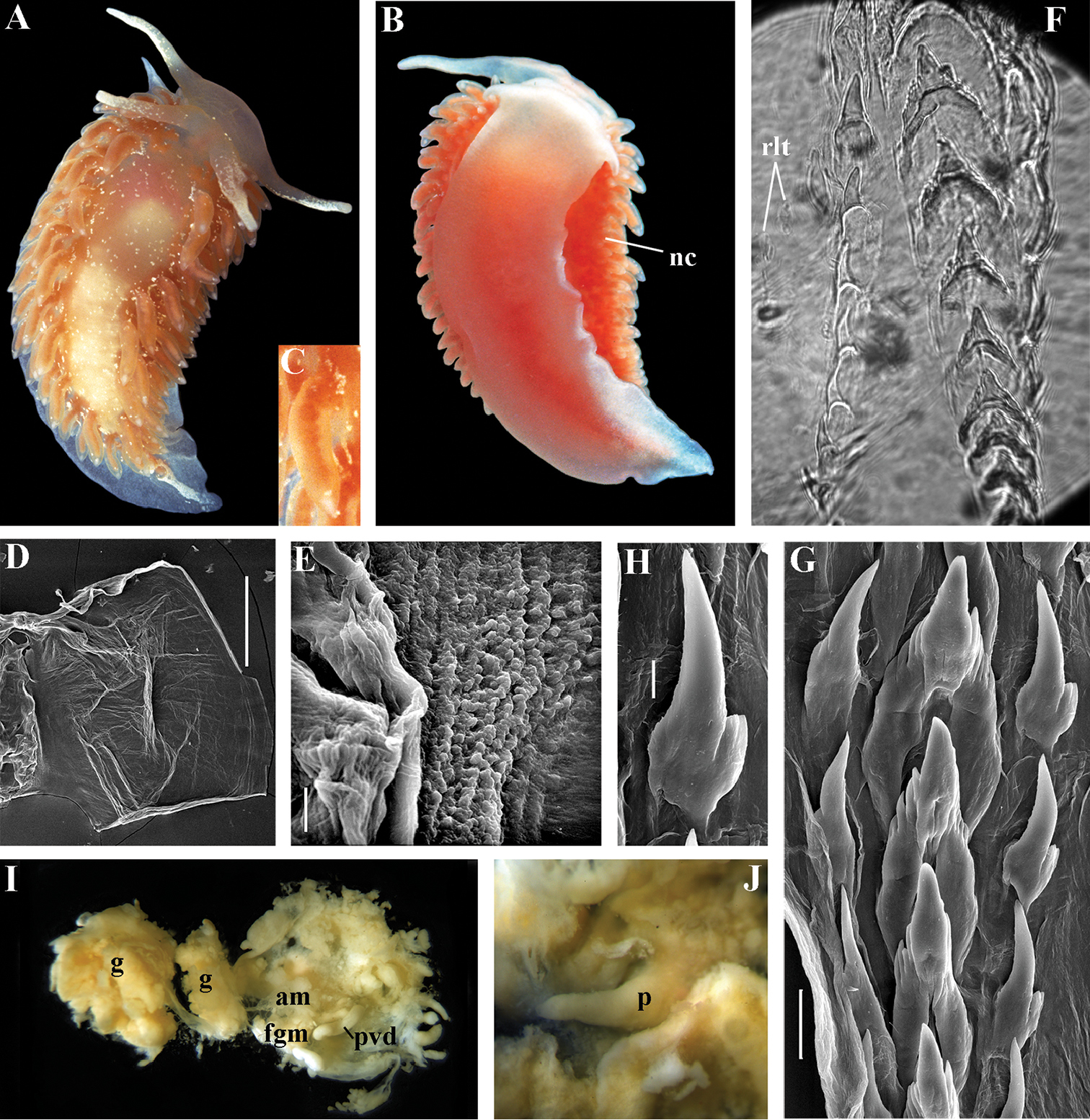
- Paracoryphella ignicrystalla

Scientific classification
- Kingdom: Animalia
- Phylum: Mollusca
- Class: Gastropoda
- Order: Nudibranchia
- Suborder: Aeolidacea
- Family: Paracoryphellidae
- Genus: Paracoryphella; M. C. Miller, 1971

= Paracoryphella =

Genus of sea slugs

Paracoryphella is a genus of sea slugs, specifically aeolid nudibranchs, marine gastropod molluscs in the family Paracoryphellidae.

== Species ==
Species within the genus Paracoryphella are as follows:

- Paracoryphella ignicrystalla Korshunova, Martynov, Bakken, Evertsen, Fletcher, Mudianta, Saito, Lundin, Schrödl & Picton, 2017
- Paracoryphella islandica (Odhner, 1937)
- Paracoryphella parva (Hadfield, 1963)
