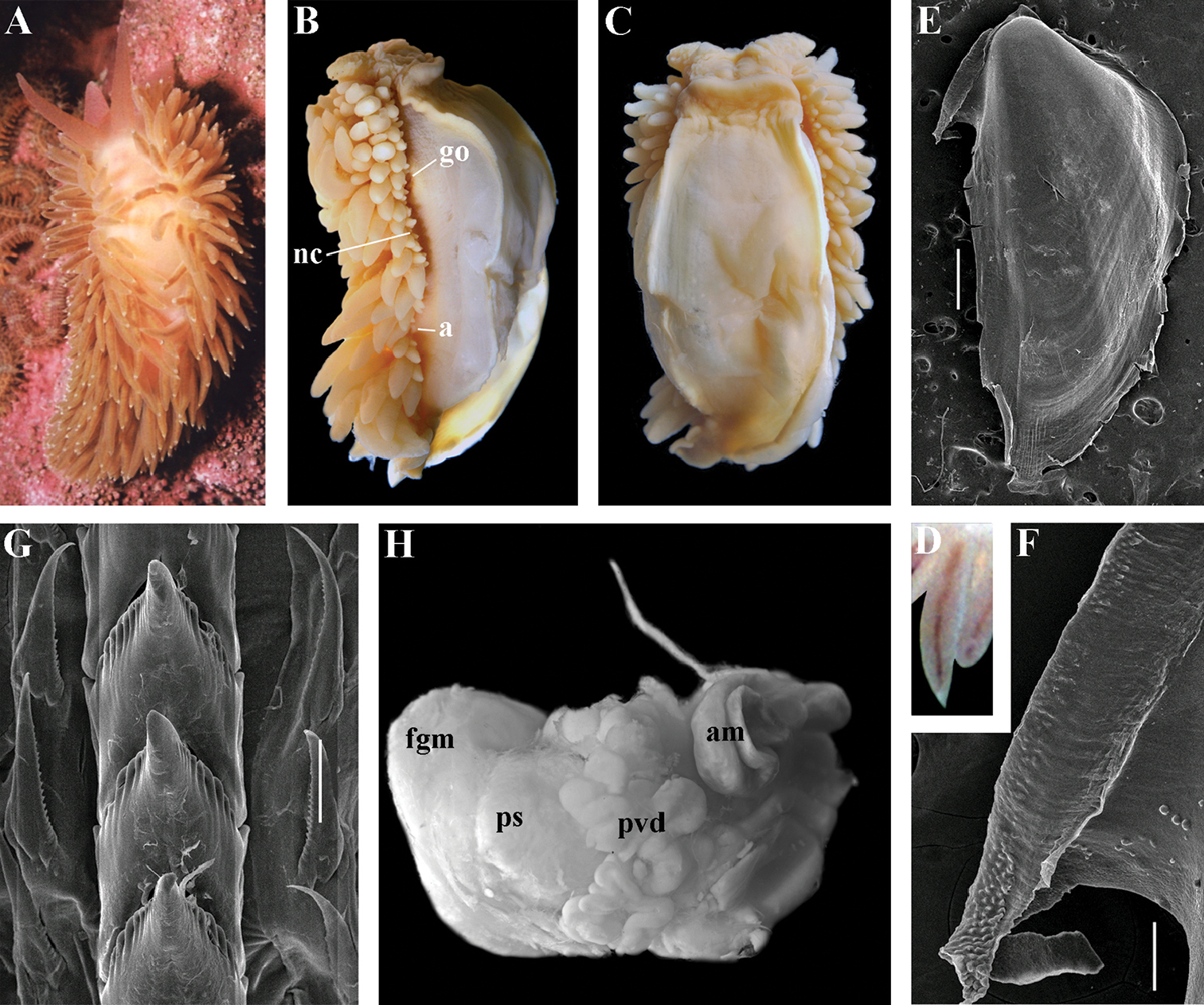

Scientific classification
- Kingdom: Animalia
- Phylum: Mollusca
- Class: Gastropoda
- Order: Nudibranchia
- Suborder: Aeolidacea
- Family: Flabellinidae
- Genus: Ziminella
- Species: Z. salmonacea

Binomial name
- Ziminella salmonacea (Couthouy, 1838)

Synonyms
- List: Aeolidia papilligera Michaelis & Scherk, 1847; Cavolina salmonacea (Couthouy, 1838); Coryphella laevidens Knipowitsch, 1902; Coryphella salmonacea (Couthouy, 1838); Coryphella stimpsoni (A. E. Verrill, 1879); Coryphella stimpsoni laevidens N. Knipowitsch, 1902; Cuthona stimpsoni A. E. Verrill, 1879; Eolis salmonacea Couthouy, 1838; Flabellina salmonacea (Couthouy, 1838)

= Ziminella salmonacea =

Species of gastropod

Ziminella salmonacea, common name the salmon aeolis, is a species of sea slug, an aeolid nudibranch, a marine gastropod mollusc in the family Paracoryphellidae.

== Distribution ==
This species occurs in the Arctic seas; (Greenland, Iceland, Spitsbergen, North Pacific (Bering Strait, Point Barrow, Alaska, British Columbia), the Western Atlantic (Cape Cod (Mass.) north to Halifax (Nova Scotia)) and the Eastern Atlantic and northern European waters (north coast of Norway).

== Description ==
The white, translucent, broad body of this species reaches a length between 25 and 50 mm, and ends in a thin, tapered tail. The cerata are swollen with a thin orange or pink digestive gland duct. There are opaque white markings at the tips of the cerata and on the outer parts of the rhinophores and oral tentacles.

An orange color variation may occur, caused by a diet of sea anemones rather than ascidians. This was previously considered to be a distinct species, Coryphella stimpsoni. The maximum recorded length is 50 mm.

== Ecology ==
These sea slugs can be found consuming the colonial tunicate Amaroucium constellatum Verrill, 1871 which is an unusual diet for an aeolid nudibranch. Juveniles have been found feeding on hydroids, especially Tubularia. The salmon aeolis, like other nudibranchs, is a simultaneous hermaphrodite with reciprocal mating and sperm storage. They lay their eggs in a long, twisted, gelatinous mass.
