= Monterey Peninsula =

Peninsula in California, USA

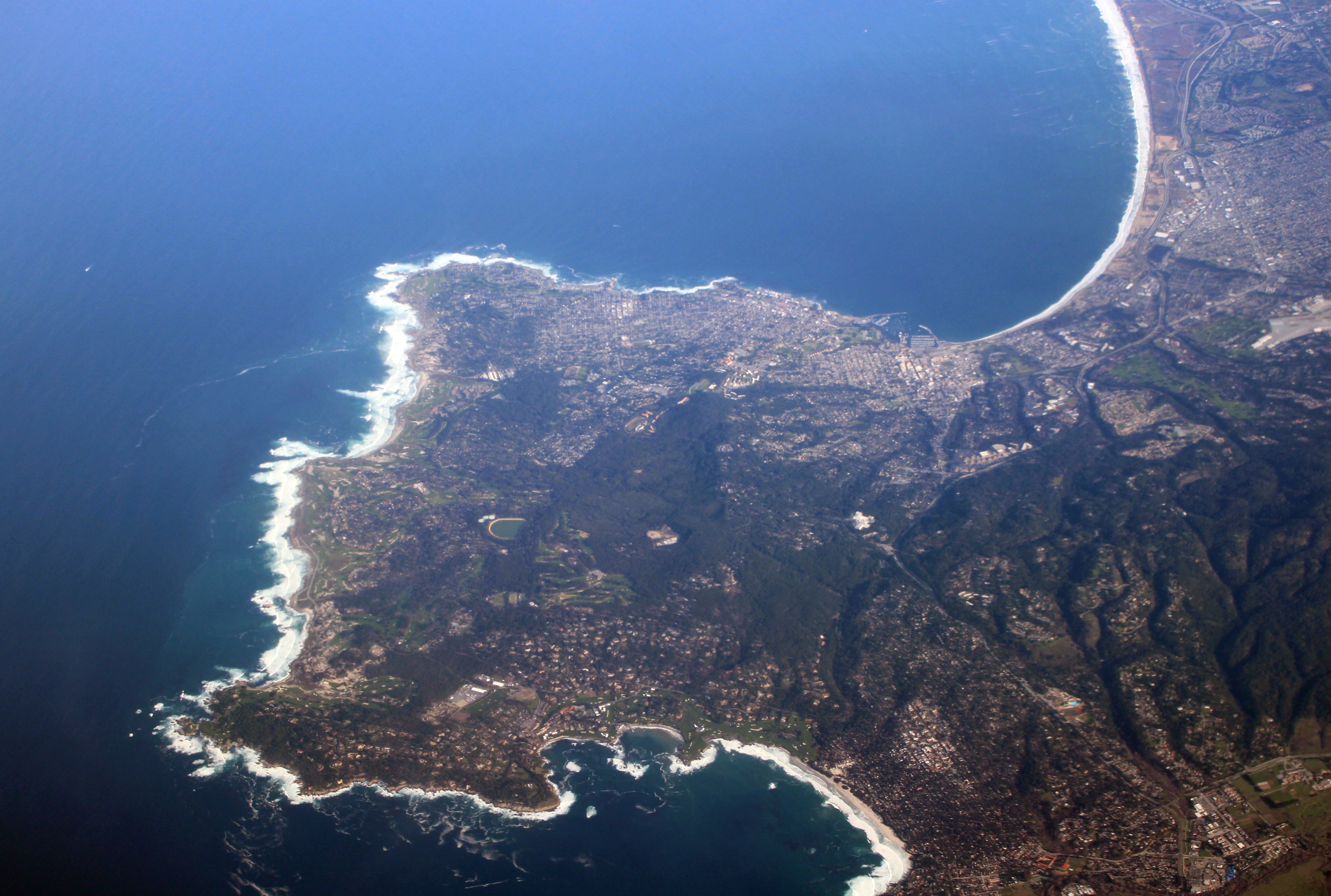
- Aerial view of the Monterey Peninsula as seen from a jet airliner

- Location within California

Geography
- Location: California
- Coordinates: 36°35′45″N 121°55′50″W
- Adjacent to: Pacific Ocean

Administration
- United States

The Monterey Peninsula anchors the northern portion on the Central Coast of California and comprises the cities of Monterey, Carmel, and Pacific Grove, and the resort and community of Pebble Beach.

== History ==
=== Monterey ===
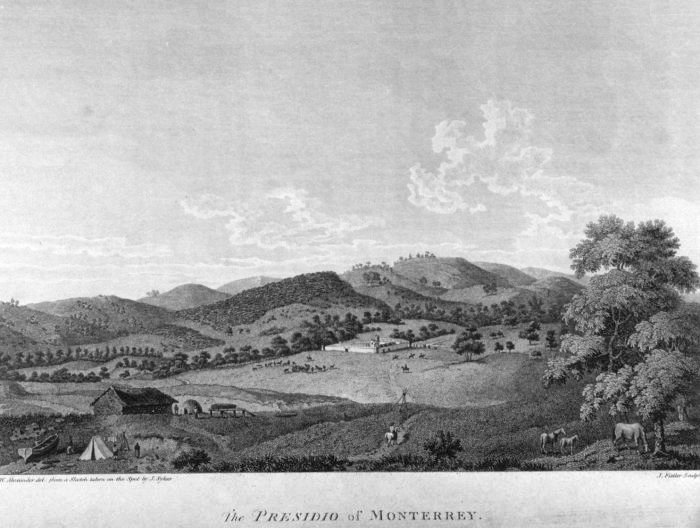
The Presidio of Monterrey". Volume II, plate V from: "A Voyage of Discovery to the North Pacific Ocean and Round the World" by Captain George Vancouver

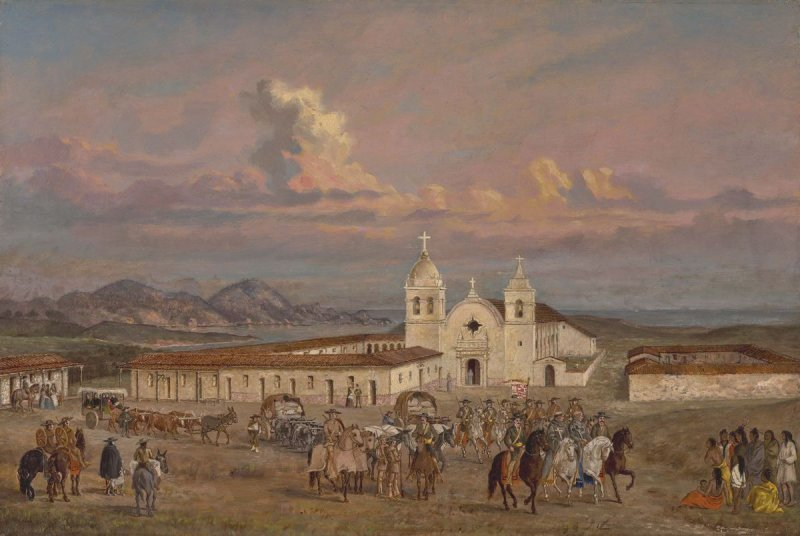
Mission San Carlos Borromeo de Carmelo, established in 1770, was the headquarters of the Californian mission system from 1797 until 1833.

Monterey was founded in 1770 by missionary Junípero Serra and explorer Gaspar de Portolà. Portolà erected the Presidio of Monterey to defend the port against an expected Russian trading and settlement invasion.

At the same time, Serra founded Mission San Carlos Borromeo, second in the chain of Spanish Missions of California. Originally near the presidio, the mission later moved a few miles south to its current location at the mouth of Carmel Valley.

Monterey served as the capital of upper Las Californias and Alta California from 1777 to 1848, under the flags of Spain, independent Mexico, and the United States. The city was originally the only port of entry for taxable goods in California. All shipments into California by sea were required to go through the Custom House, the oldest governmental building in the state, and California's Historic Landmark Number One. Built in 3 phases, construction on the Custom House began in 1814 under the Spanish, the center section under Mexican rule in 1827, with the lower end completed by the United States in 1846. Monterey was also the site of the July 7, 1846, Battle of Monterey during the Mexican–American War. It was on this date that John D. Sloat, Commodore in the United States Navy, raised the U.S. flag over the Monterey Custom House and claimed California for the United States.

In addition, many California "firsts" occurred in Monterey. These include the First theater in California, brick house, publicly funded school, public building, public library, and printing press, which printed The Californian, the first newspaper. Colton Hall, built in 1849 by Walter Colton, was originally a public school and government meeting place. It also hosted California's first constitutional convention. Today it houses a museum, while adjacent buildings serve as the seat of local government. The Monterey post office opened in 1849. Monterey incorporated in 1889.

The city has a noteworthy history as a center for California painters in the late 19th and early 20th centuries. Such painters as Arthur Frank Mathews, Armin Hansen, Xavier Martinez, Rowena Meeks Abdy and Percy Gray lived or visited to pursue painting in the style of either En plein air or Tonalism. In addition to painters many noted authors through the years have also lived in and around the Monterey area such as John Steinbeck, Robinson Jeffers, Robert A. Heinlein, Henry Miller, Ed Ricketts, and Robert Louis Stevenson. More recently, Monterey has been recognized for its significant involvement in post-secondary learning of languages other than English and its major role in delivering translation and interpretation services around the world. In November 1995, California Governor Pete Wilson proclaimed Monterey as "The Language Capital of the World".

=== Pacific Grove ===
Pacific Grove was founded in 1875 by a group of Methodists who modeled the town after Ocean Grove, New Jersey. In time, the butterflies, fragrant pines and fresh sea air brought others to the Pacific Grove Retreat to rest and meditate. The initial meeting of the Pacific Coast branch of the Chautauqua Literary and Scientific Circle was held in Pacific Grove in June 1879. Modelled after the Methodist Sunday school teachers’ training camp established in 1874 at Lake Chautauqua, N.Y., this location became part of a nationwide educational network. In November 1879, after the summer campers returned home, Robert Louis Stevenson wandered into the deserted campgrounds: "I have never been in any place so dreamlike. Indeed, it was not so much like a deserted town as like a scene upon the stage by daylight, and with no one on the boards." Today, Stevenson School in nearby Pebble Beach is named after the author. The Pacific Grove post office opened in 1886, closed later that year, and was re-opened in 1887. Pacific Grove incorporated in 1889.

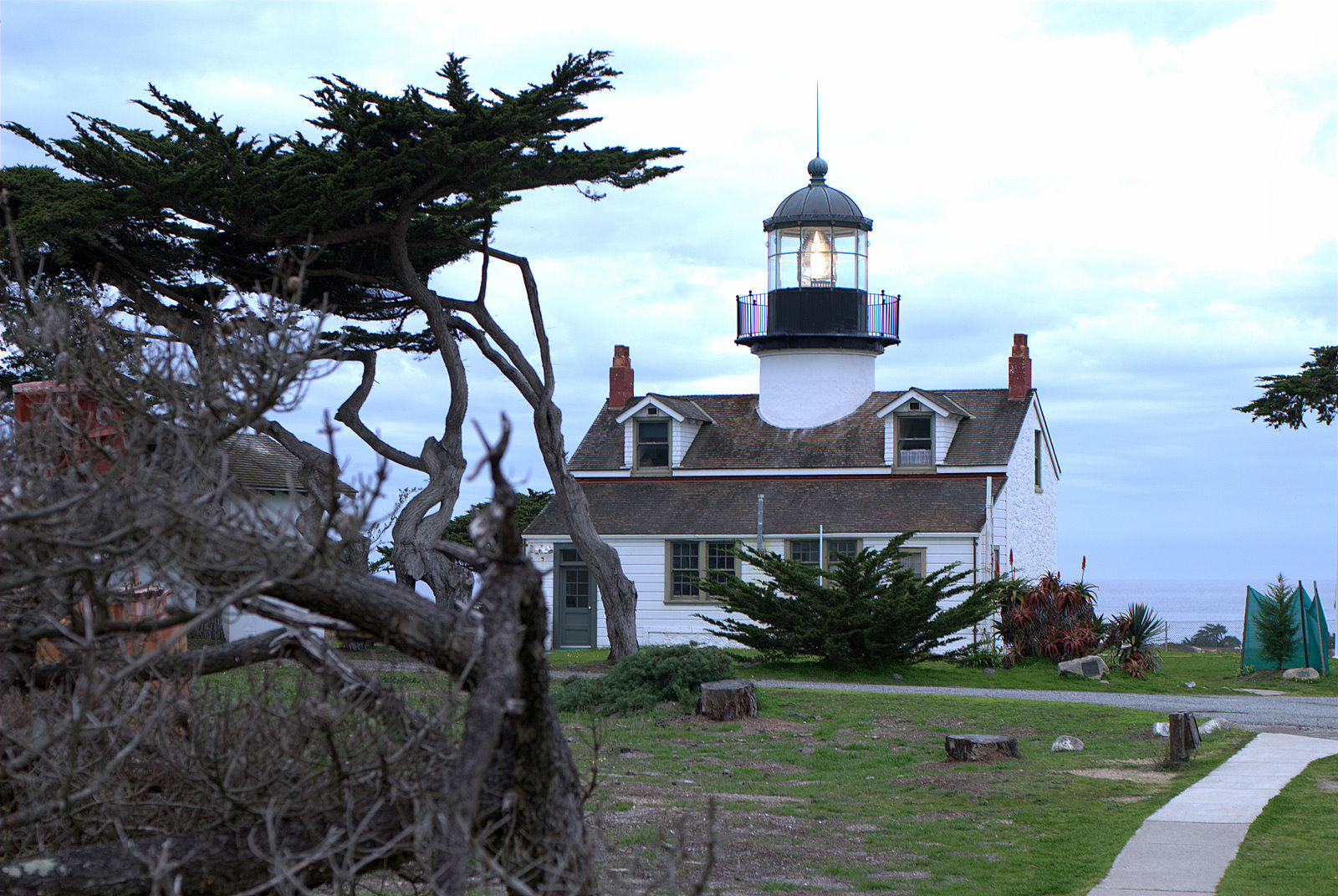
Point Pinos Lighthouse, Pacific Grove, California.

Pacific Grove, like Carmel-by-the-Sea and Monterey, became an artists' haven in the 1890s and subsequent period. Artists of the En plein air school in both Europe and the United States were seeking an outdoor venue which had natural beauty, so that Pacific Grove was a magnet for this movement. English painter William Adam and other artists moved to Pacific Grove in the early 1900s. For a number of years, John Steinbeck lived in a cottage in Pacific Grove owned by his father, Ernest, who was Monterey County Treasurer. The cottage still stands on a quiet side street, without any plaque or special sign, virtually overlooked by most Steinbeck fans. In Steinbeck's book Sweet Thursday, a chapter is dedicated to describing a (probably fictional) rivalry that arose among the town's residents over the game of roque.

The Point Piños Light in Pacific Grove is the oldest continually operating lighthouse on the West Coast of the United States. It was built in 1855, and has served as an aid to navigation ever since.

=== Carmel-by-the-Sea ===
The city of Carmel-by-the-Sea (or Carmel for short) is commonly considered part of the Peninsula area even though the city technically is adjacent to the peninsula instead of on it.

In 1902 James Frank Devendorf and Frank Powers, on behalf of the Carmel Development Company, filed a new subdivision map of the core village that became Carmel-by-the-Sea. The Carmel post office opened the same year. In 1910, the Carnegie Institution established the Coastal Laboratory, and a number of scientists moved to the area. Carmel incorporated in 1916.

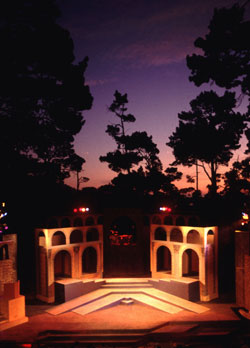
Sunset over the 1994 Carmel Shakespeare Festival production of Julius Caesar at Carmel's historic Forest Theater

In 1905 the Carmel Arts and Crafts Club was formed to support and produce artistic works. After the 1906 San Francisco earthquake the village was inundated with musicians, writers, painters other artists turning to the established artist colony after the bay city was destroyed. The new residents were offered home lots - ten dollars down, little or no interest, and whatever they could pay on a monthly basis. In 1907 the town's first cultural center and theatre, the Carmel Arts and Crafts Clubhouse, was built. Poets Austin and Sterling performed their "private theatricals" there.

In 1911, the town's rich Shakespearean tradition began with a production of Twelfth Night, directed by Garnet Holme of UC Berkeley and featuring future mayors Perry Newberry and Herbert Heron, with settings designed by artist DeNeale Morgan. By 1914, the club had achieved national recognition, with an article The Mercury Herald commenting "...a fever of activity seems to have seized the community and each newcomer is immediately inoculated and begins with great enthusiasm to do something... with plays, studios and studies...".

=== Fishing industry ===
In the late 19th century the fishing industry became the area's most profitable and important economic sector. Started by mostly Italian immigrants in Monterey and Chinese immigrants in Pacific Grove, the fishing industry flourished. By the 1930s canneries lined the northern shore of the Peninsula. These canneries were the setting for the novels Cannery Row and Sweet Thursday by local author John Steinbeck. By the early 1940s, however, the fishing industry was dealt a devastating blow when the heavily overfished waters did not yield the amounts of fish needed to keep the canneries profitable. The end of big business fishing on the Monterey Bay was the beginning of several conservation efforts which eventually led to the creation of the Monterey Bay National Marine Sanctuary.

=== Tourism ===
While the fishing industry was very important to the area, so was tourism. The Hotel Del Monte, opened in 1880, was the first true resort complex in the United States and was the forerunner to today's Pebble Beach Company. It became popular with the wealthy and influential of the day, and hosted guests from Theodore Roosevelt to Ernest Hemingway, as well as many early Hollywood stars. A train station was built in Monterey expressly for the purpose of bringing visitors to the resort, and the Del Monte name is still frequently seen around town. The Hotel Del Monte was requisitioned by the Navy at the beginning of World War II, and is now the central building of the Naval Postgraduate School.

The hotel's park reservation, originally used for hunting and other outdoor activities, became Pebble Beach, an unincorporated community and well-known golf resort area. The famous 17-Mile Drive was originally designed as a local excursion for visitors to the Del Monte, in which they could take in the historic sights of Monterey and Pacific Grove and the scenery of what would become Pebble Beach.

Today, tourism serves as the Peninsula's main industry. The old Cannery Row is a tourist center lined with boutiques, restaurants, and hotels.

== Flora and natural history ==
Due in part to its geography and climate, the Monterey Peninsula has not only a high degree of species endemism, but also presents a unique combination of non-endemic species due to overlap of species with more northerly versus more southerly ranges. Some taxa, such as the coastal closed-cone pines (which include Monterey pine) and the Monterey cypress are relict stands, i.e. species that once extended more widely in the mesic climate of the late Pleistocene epoch, but then retreated to small pockets of cooler and moister conditions along the coast ranges during the hotter, drier early and middle Holocene epoch between 6000 and 2000 BC.

According to the maps of the United States Geological Survey, the highest elevation of the peninsula, 250 meters (825 feet) above sea level, is on the north-south ridge that runs the length of the peninsula. The climate is a cool Mediterranean type, strongly influenced by the prevailing winds from the west, which blow over the Pacific Coast's cool ocean current from Alaska and the cold water that wells up from Monterey Bay's submarine canyon. At the National Weather Service's Climate Station in the City of Monterey at 385 feet elevation, the coldest month is January, with an average daily high of 15.5 °C (60 °F); the warmest month is September, with an average daily high of 22 °C (71.5 °F); the average daily low is 6 °C (43 °F) in January and 11.5 °C (53 °F) in September; and the average rainfall is 50 centimeters (19.7 inches) per year, with 90.3% falling during November through April. During summer, fog drip is the primary source of moisture for plants that would otherwise not be able to persist with such low summer precipitation. The fog drip and precipitation are heaviest along the spine and west side of the ridge because the prevailing winds and precipitation come from the west. The weather can be much hotter when the winds blow from the east: Since 1906, there have been 11 days with a high of 37.8 °C (100 °F) or higher; all 11 days occurred in June, September, or October.

A variety of natural habitats are found on the Monterey Peninsula: littoral zone and sand dunes; closed-cone pine forest; and Monterey cypress. During the early 1900s, Willis Linn Jepson characterized the forests on the Monterey Peninsula as the "most important silva ever", and encouraged Samuel F. B. Morse of the Del Monte Properties Company to explore the possibilities of preserving the unique forest communities. The forests of the Monterey Peninsula are now called the Del Monte Forest. The dune area is also important, as it hosts endangered species such as the vascular plants seaside birds beak and Eastwoods Ericameria. The closed cone pine forest habitat is dominated by Monterey pine, knobcone pine and bishop pine, and contains the rare Monterey manzanita and endangered Hickman's potentilla and Yadon's piperia; rare plants inhabiting chaparral habitat in Monterey are: Hickman's onion and Sandmat manzanita. Other rare plants on the peninsula are: Hutchinson's larkspur, Tidestrom lupine; Gardner's yampah and Monterey knotweed.

== Marine protected areas ==
Soquel Canyon State Marine Conservation Area, Portuguese Ledge State Marine Conservation Area, Pacific Grove Marine Gardens State Marine Conservation Area, Lovers Point State Marine Reserve, Edward F. Ricketts State Marine Conservation Area and Asilomar State Marine Reserve are marine protected areas in Monterey Bay. Like underwater parks, these marine protected areas help conserve ocean wildlife and marine ecosystems.

== Infrastructure ==
California State Route 1 is the major north-south highway through the area. Although it travels along the coast for most of its length, Highway 1 bypasses the immediately coastline of the Monterey Peninsula and instead primarily travels inland on the eastern side of the area as a freeway. California State Route 68 provides access east to Salinas.

The proposed Monterey Peninsula Supply Water Project includes a desalination facility and additional aquifer storage capacity that is intended to provide a reliable, long-term water supply. The project will use subsurface slant wells that draw from a brackish aquifer that consists mostly of seawater located just behind the coast line. Since the intake does not reach into the ocean, potential harm to sealife can be avoided. The wells drawing the water for desalination must not access the Salinas Valley Groundwater Basin. The California state water board originally set a deadline of December 31, 2016 to reduce pumping from the Carmel River by 70%. The project has the support of Peninsula mayors water authority together with local business and community leaders. The Marina Coast Water District and Ag Land Trust have concerns about the test well pumping impacts on the area's groundwater supply and would prefer a full environmental impact report be prepared for the project.

== Demographics ==
Percentage of households in each income bracket on the Monterey Peninsula and nationwide, according to data from the 2000 U.S. Census.

At the 2000 Census, the Peninsula (Monterey, Pacific Grove, Carmel and Pebble Beach) had 53,808 residents, 84.8% of whom were White, 8.5% Hispanic or Latino, 6.0% Asian or Pacific Islander and 1.8% were African American. The Peninsula was considerably more affluent than the national average: the percentage of households with six figure incomes being 60% higher and the percentage of households with incomes of less than $25,000 being 54% lower than the national average. In terms of income distribution 19.8% of households had incomes of less than $25,000, while 27.2% had incomes between $25,000 and $50,000, 21.1% incomes between $50,000 and $75,000, 11.9% incomes between $75,000 and $100,000 and 19.8% had incomes exceeding $100,000 compared to 30.5%, 25.8%, 18.4%, 10.3% and 12.3% at the national level, respectively.
