= Soquel Canyon State Marine Conservation Area =

Marine protected area in Monterey Bay

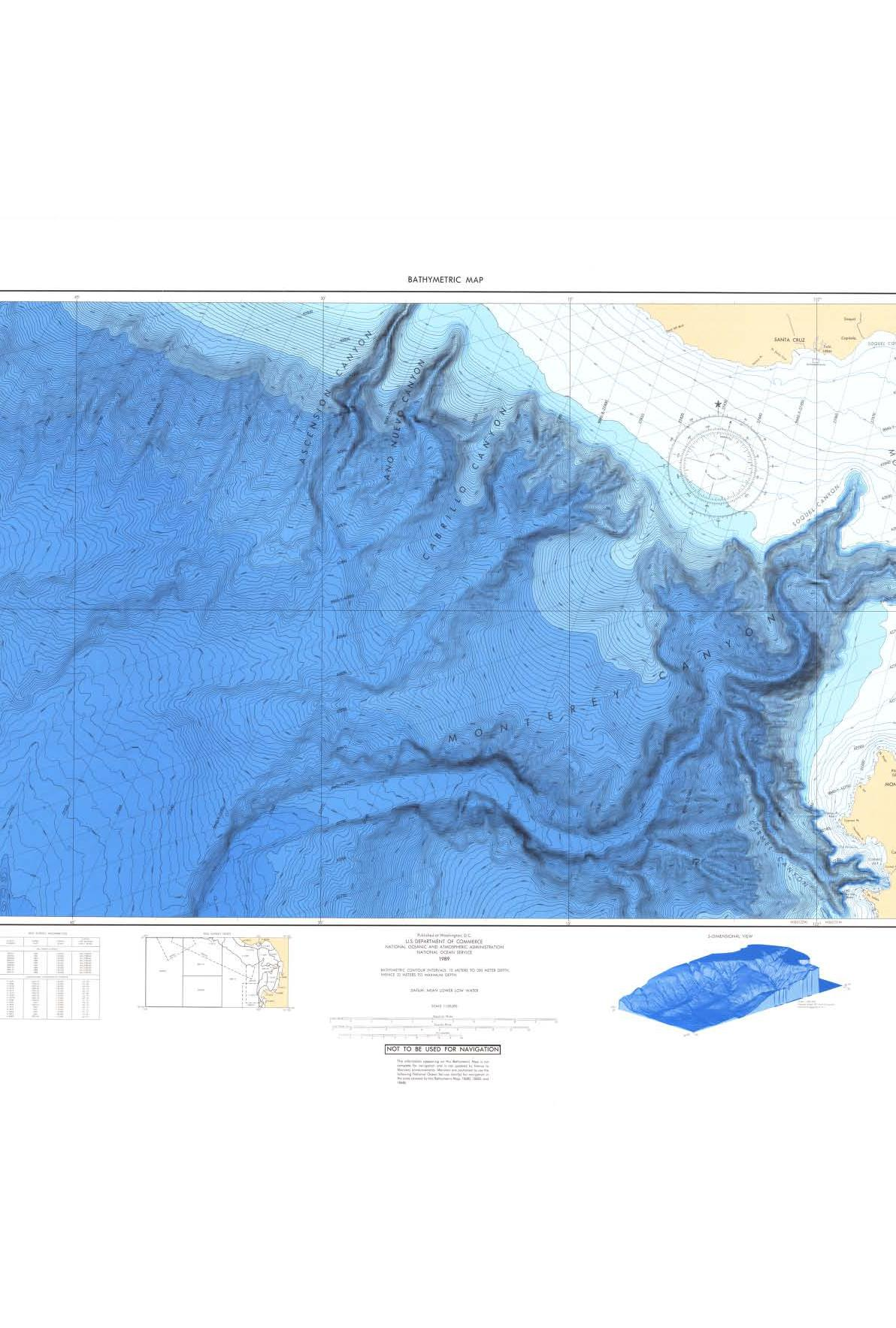
Bathymetric Chart of Monterey Submarine Canyon

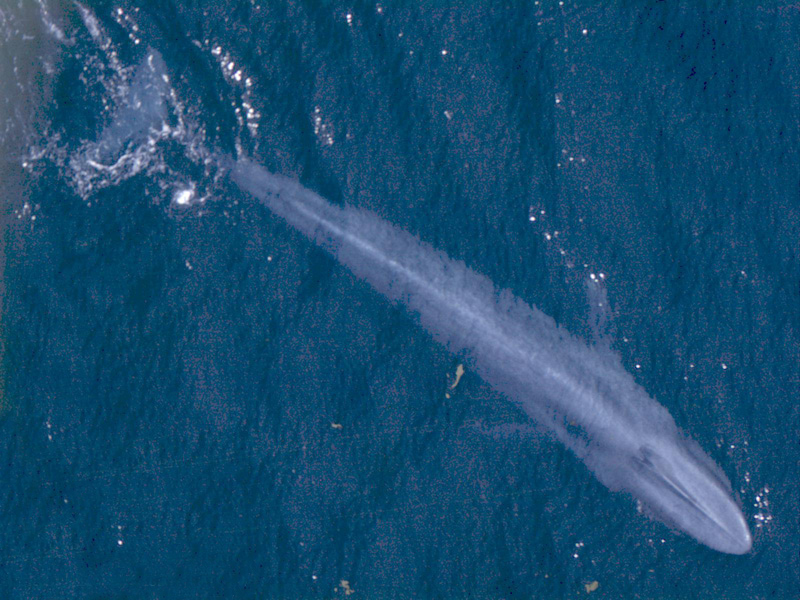
Blue whales are found in the Monterey Submarine Canyon

Soquel Canyon State Marine Conservation Area (SMCA) is an offshore marine protected area in Monterey Bay. Monterey Bay is on California’s central coast with the city of Monterey at its south end and the city of Santa Cruz at its north end. The SMCA covers 23.41 square miles (60.6 km^{2}). Within the SMCA, fishing and taking of any living marine resources is prohibited except the commercial and recreational take of pelagic finfish.

== History ==
Soquel Canyon SMCA was established in September 2007 by the California Department of Fish & Game. It was one of 29 marine protected areas adopted during the first phase of the Marine Life Protection Act Initiative. The Marine Life Protection Act Initiative (or MLPAI) is a collaborative public process to create a statewide network of marine protected areas along the California coastline.

== Geography and natural features ==
The Soquel Canyon SMCA captures an entire side-branch of the Monterey Submarine Canyon.

This marine protected area is bounded by straight lines connecting the points:

- 36°51′N 121°56′W
- 36°51′N 122°3.8′W
- 36°48′N 122°2.88′W
- 36°48′N 121°56′W

== Habitat and wildlife ==
The Monterey Submarine Canyon is a unique and biologically productive habitat. The rocky canyon walls and mud-and-sand canyon floor offer ideal habitat for rockfishes including depleted species. It contains communities of fragile deepwater corals and sponges. The area is also an important seabird forage ground and whale feeding area.

== Recreation and nearby attractions ==
The natural environment and ocean resources of the Monterey Peninsula draw millions of visitors from around the world each year, including more than 65,000 scuba divers drawn by the area's easy access, variety of wildlife, and kelp forests.

The Monterey Bay Aquarium is a tourist attraction featuring a 28-foot (8.5 m) deep living kelp forest. The exhibit includes many of the species native to the nearby marine protected areas. The aquarium also houses sea otters, intertidal wildlife, and occasionally sea turtles.

In addition to diving and visiting the aquarium, people visit Monterey Bay for kayaking, whale watching, charter fishing, surfing, bird watching, tidepooling and walking on the beach.

California’s marine protected areas encourage recreational and educational uses of the ocean. Activities such as kayaking, diving, snorkeling, and swimming are allowed unless otherwise restricted.

== Scientific monitoring ==
As specified by the Marine Life Protection Act, select marine protected areas along California’s central coast are being monitored by scientists to track their effectiveness and learn more about ocean health. Similar studies in marine protected areas located off of the Santa Barbara Channel Islands have already detected gradual improvements in fish size and number.

Local scientific and educational institutions involved in the monitoring include Stanford University’s Hopkins Marine Station, University of California Santa Cruz, Moss Landing Marine Laboratories and Cal Poly San Luis Obispo. Research methods include hook-and-line sampling, intertidal and scuba diver surveys, and the use of Remote Operated Vehicle (ROV) submarines.
