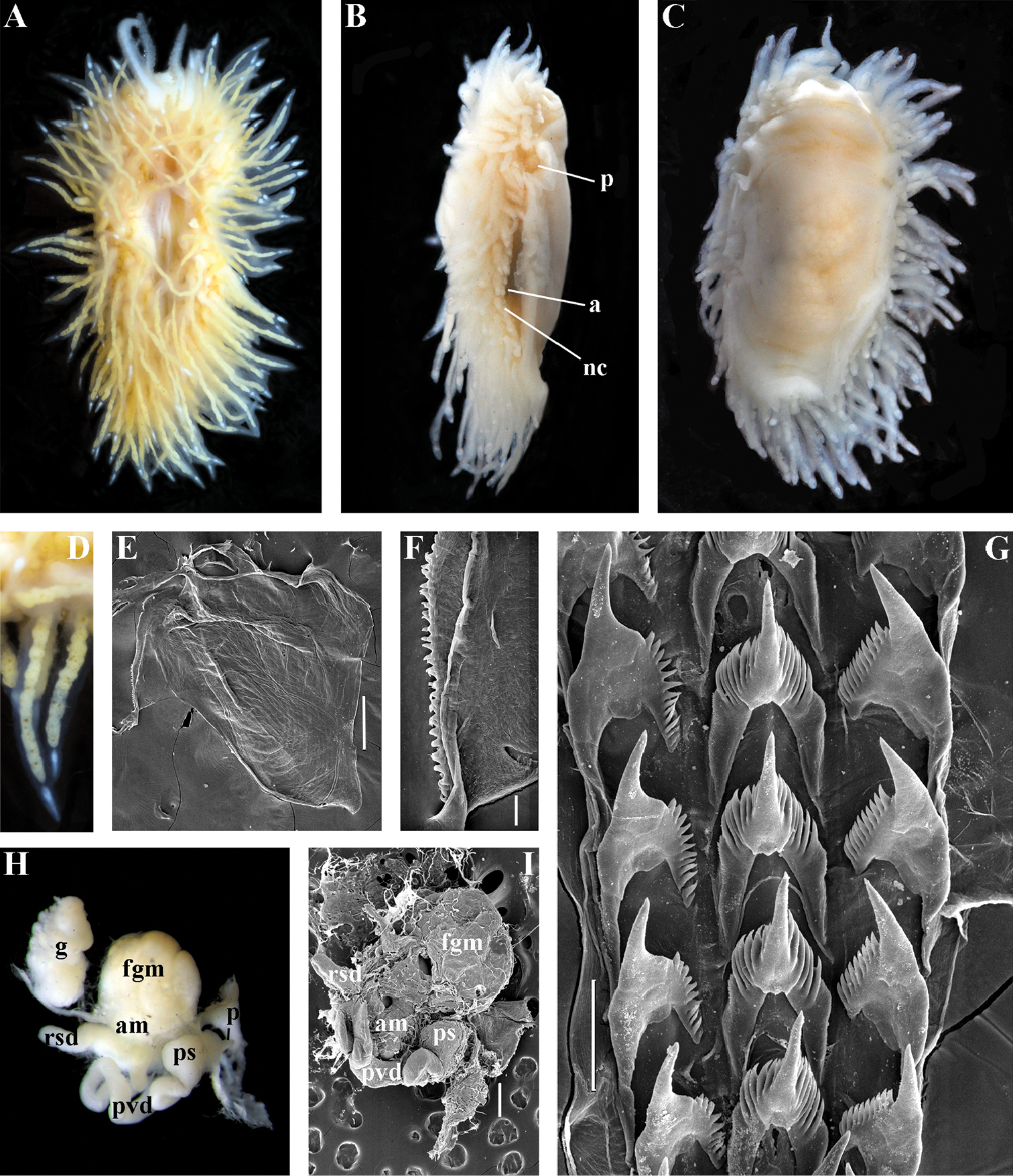

Scientific classification
- Kingdom: Animalia
- Phylum: Mollusca
- Class: Gastropoda
- Order: Nudibranchia
- Suborder: Aeolidacea
- Family: Paracoryphellidae
- Genus: Polaria
- Species: P. polaris

Binomial name
- Polaria polaris (Volodchenko, 1946)

Synonyms
- Coryphella polaris Volodchenko, 1946; Flabellina polaris (Volodchenko, 1946)

= Polaria polaris =

Species of gastropod

Polaria polaris is a species of sea slug, an aeolid nudibranch, a marine heterobranch mollusc in the family Paracoryphellidae.

== Distribution ==
This species was described from the Arctic Ocean.

== Description ==
Polaria polaris is a flabellinid nudibranch with numerous closely spaced cerata and extremely long rhinophores. The body is translucent white and the digestive gland in the cerata is red. There is a broad band of opaque white pigment at the tip of the cerata. The rhinophores are smooth or slightly wrinkled and the oral tentacles have a splash of white pigment in the outer third.
