= Monterey Bay =

Large salt water bay in California, United States

Coordinates: 36°48′N 121°54′W

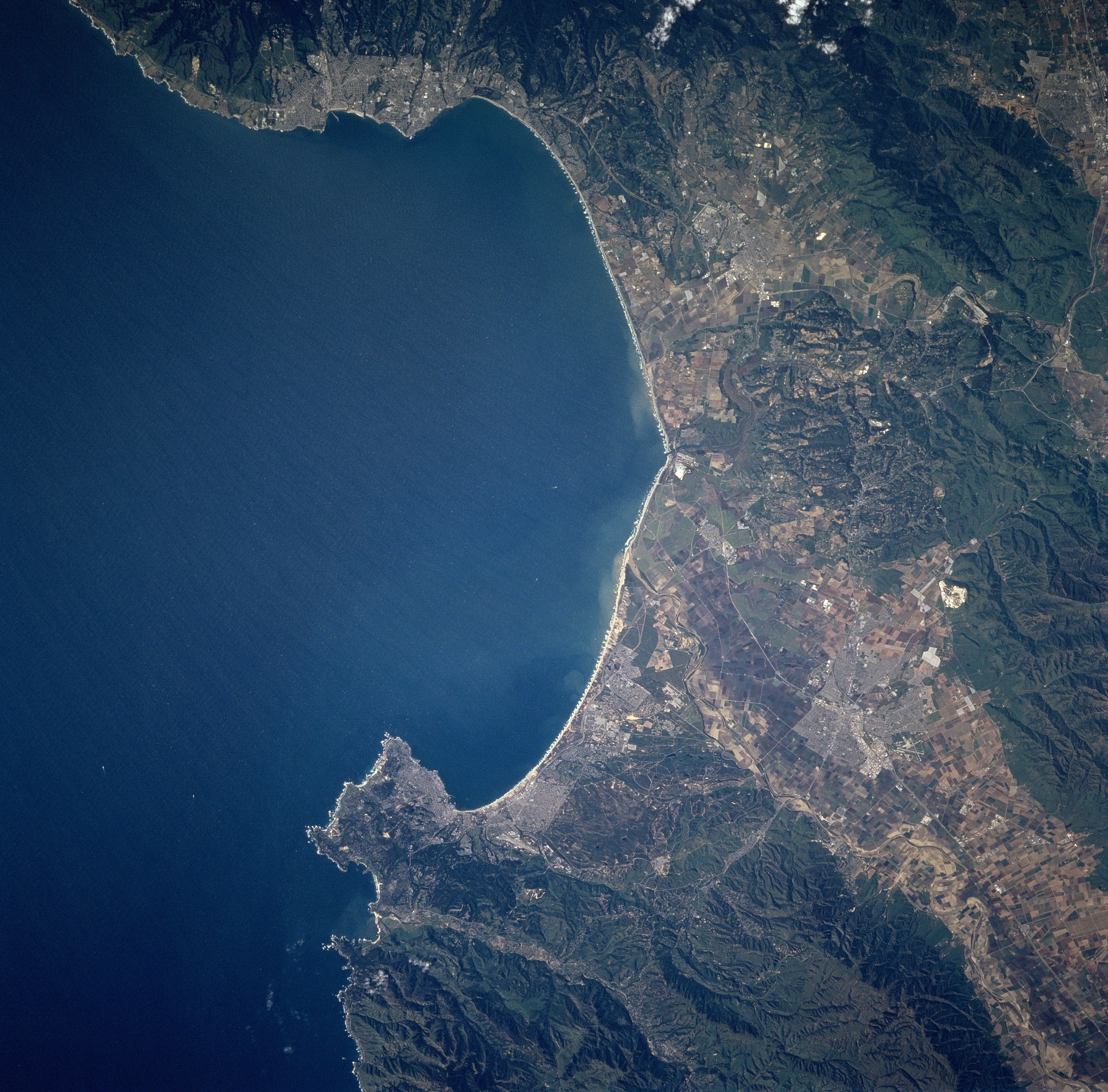
The Monterey Bay, as seen from space, stretches from Santa Cruz in the north to the Monterey Peninsula in the south

Monterey Bay is a bay of the Pacific Ocean located on the coast of the U.S. state of California, south of the San Francisco Bay Area. San Francisco itself is farther north along the coast, by about 75 miles (120 km), accessible via CA 1 and US 101.

Santa Cruz is located at the north end of the bay, and Monterey is on the Monterey Peninsula at the south end. The "Monterey Bay Area" is a regional term used to describe the Monterey Bay-adjacent Central Coast communities of Santa Cruz, Monterey, and San Benito counties. The three counties, along with Monterey Bay-adjacent cities, collaborate in the Association of Monterey Bay Governments (AMBAG) on regional issues and come together for events like the State of the Region hosted by the Monterey Bay Economic Partnership.

== Toponymy ==
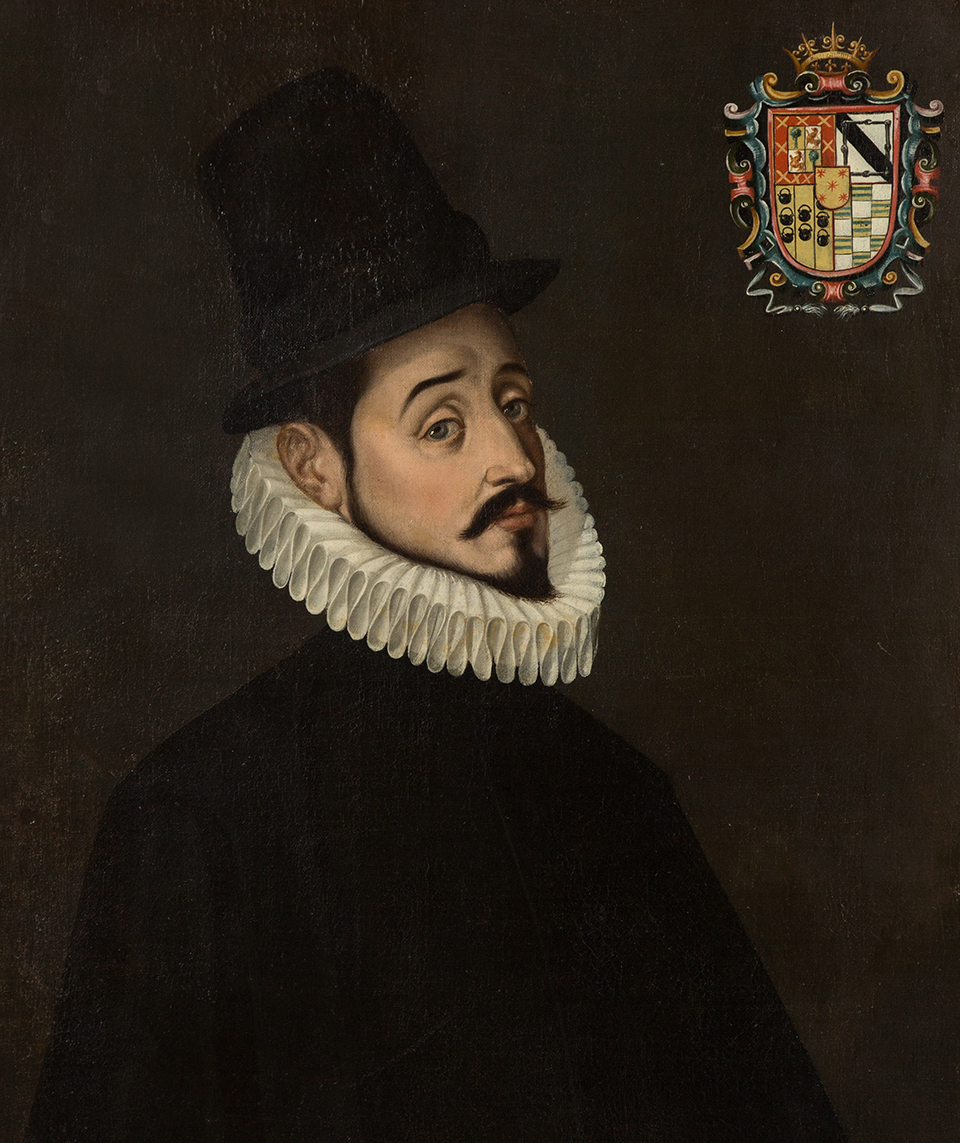
Gaspar de Zúñiga, 5th Count of Monterrey, namesake of Monterey Bay.

The first European to enter Monterey Bay was Juan Rodríguez Cabrillo on November 16, 1542, while sailing northward along the coast on an imperial Spanish naval expedition. He named the bay Bahía de los Pinos, probably because of the forest of pine trees first encountered while rounding the peninsula at the southern end of the bay. Cabrillo's name for the bay was lost, but the westernmost point of the peninsula is still known as Point Pinos.

On December 10, 1595, Sebastián Rodríguez Cermeño crossed the bay and bestowed the name Bahía de San Pedro in honor of Saint Peter Martyr.

The present name for the bay was given in 1602 by Sebastián Vizcaíno, who had been tasked by the Spanish government to complete a detailed chart of the coast. On December 16, 1602 he rounded a large peninsula and entered a bay that he named Puerto de Monterrey in honor of Don Gaspár de Zúñiga y Acevedo, 5th Count of Monterrey, who was the governor of New Spain and had dispatched the expedition. Monterrey is the Castilian spelling of Monterrei, a municipality in the Galicia region of Spain from which the viceroy and his father (the Fourth Count of Monterrei) originated.

All other place names in the vicinity containing Monterey were so named because of their proximity to the bay. This includes the Presidio of Monterey, City of Monterey, County of Monterey and Monterey Canyon.

== Geology ==
Bathymetry of Monterey Bay, showing Monterey Canyon.

The Monterey Canyon, one of the largest underwater canyons in the world, begins off the coast of Moss Landing, in the center of Monterey Bay. It is 249 miles (401 km) long, although its shape changes regularly because of currents and sediment being left in the area. The canyon is much like that of a continental slope; the biology of the canyon changes significantly in different parts of the canyon.

== Flora and fauna ==
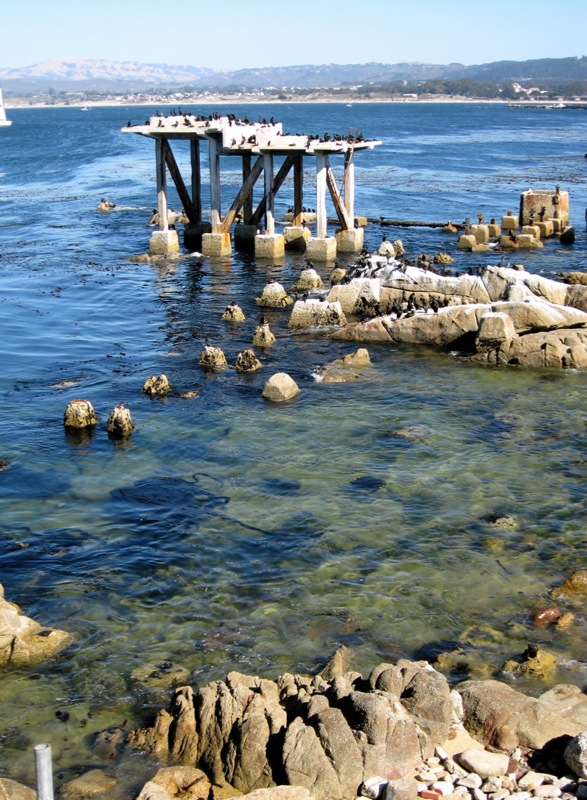
Cormorant "condo" in Monterey Bay

Monterey Bay is home to many species of marine mammals, including sea otters, harbor seals, and bottlenose dolphins; as well as being on the migratory path of gray and humpback whales and a breeding site for elephant seals. Killer whales are typically found along the coast, especially when gray whales migrate, as they hunt the whales during their migration north. Many species of fish, sharks, mollusks such as abalone and squid, birds, and sea turtles also live in the bay. Several varieties of kelp grow in the bay, some becoming as tall as trees, forming what is known as a kelp forest.

== Marine protected areas ==
Soquel Canyon State Marine Conservation Area, Portuguese Ledge State Marine Conservation Area, Pacific Grove Marine Gardens State Marine Conservation Area, Lovers Point State Marine Reserve, Edward F. Ricketts State Marine Conservation Area and Asilomar State Marine Reserve are marine protected areas in Monterey Bay. Like underwater parks, these marine protected areas help conserve ocean wildlife and marine ecosystems.

== Communities around Monterey Bay ==
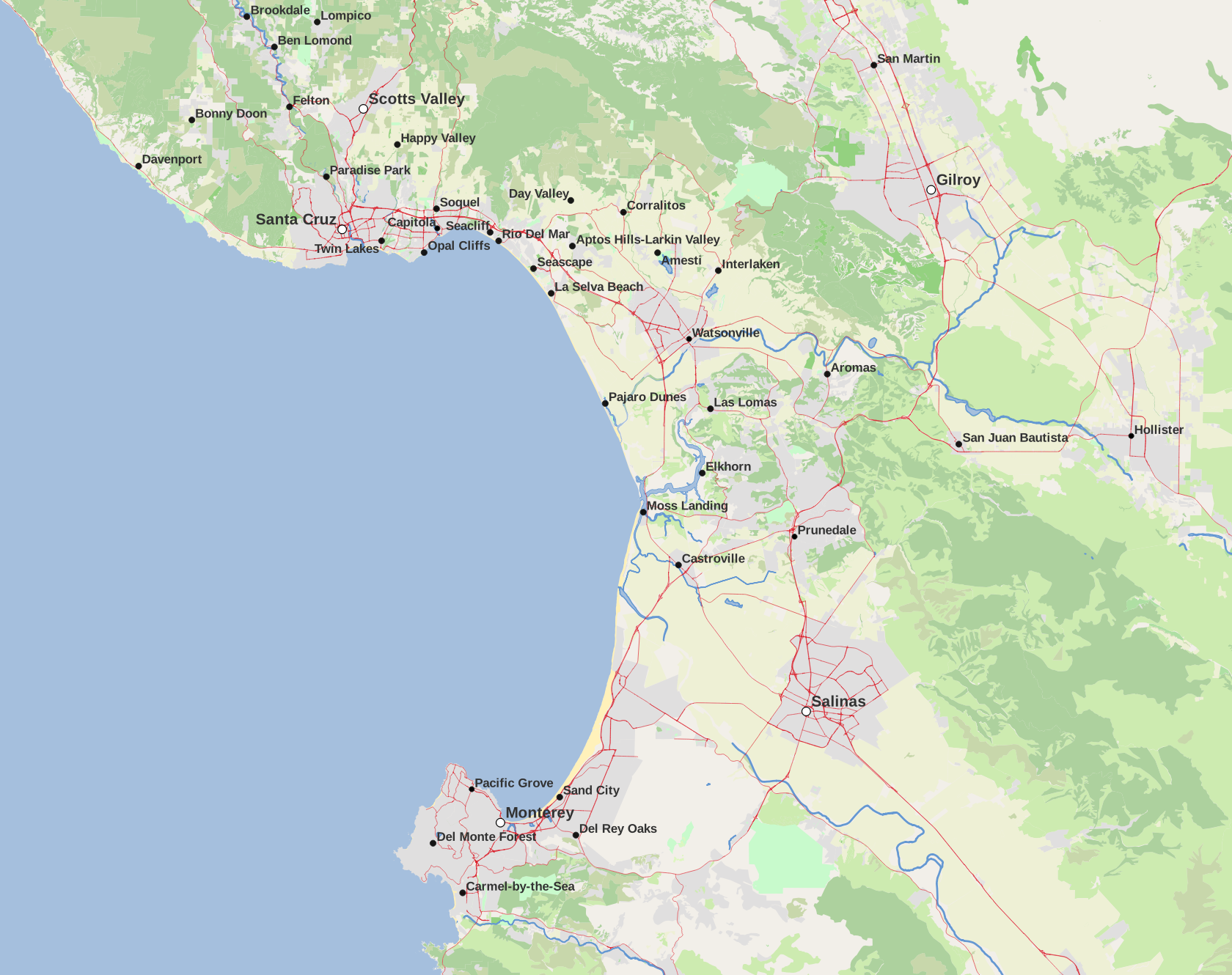
Map of the Monterey Bay Area, depicting roads, urban areas, major rivers, and forested and grassy areas

Communities are listed in clockwise order around the bay, generally from north to south. Inland communities are marked with an asterisk (*):

- Santa Cruz
- Live Oak
- Capitola
- Soquel*
- Aptos*
- Rio del Mar
- La Selva Beach
- Corralitos*
- Freedom*
- Watsonville*
- Pajaro*
- Las Lomas*
- Elkhorn*
- Moss Landing
- Castroville
- Salinas*
- Marina
- Fort Ord*
- Sand City
- Seaside
- Del Rey Oaks*
- Monterey
- New Monterey
- Pacific Grove

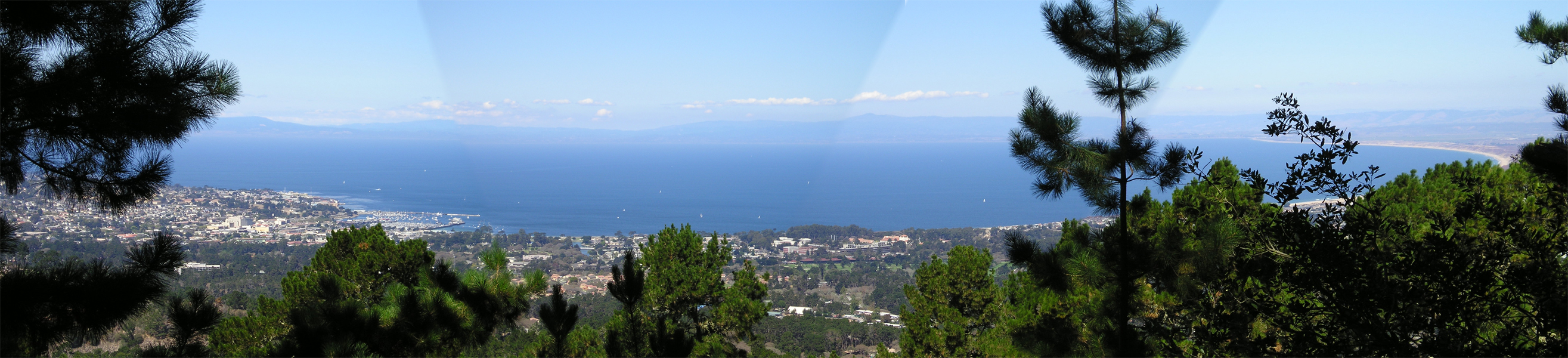
Panorama of Monterey Bay from Jacks Peak Park

== In popular culture ==
Apple's desktop operating system, macOS Monterey, is named after this region.

== Gallery ==
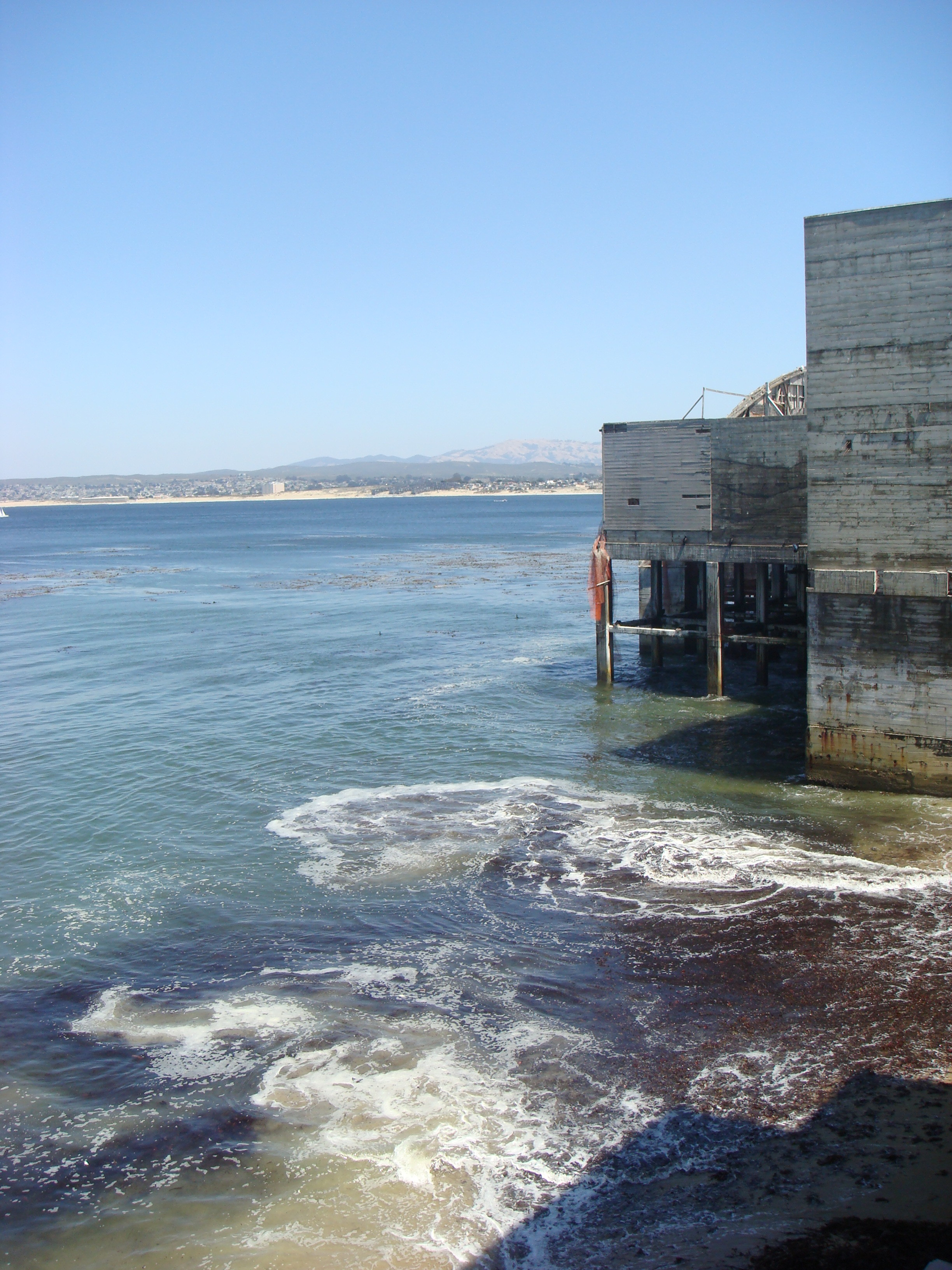
Monterey Bay seen with the old Cannery Foundations

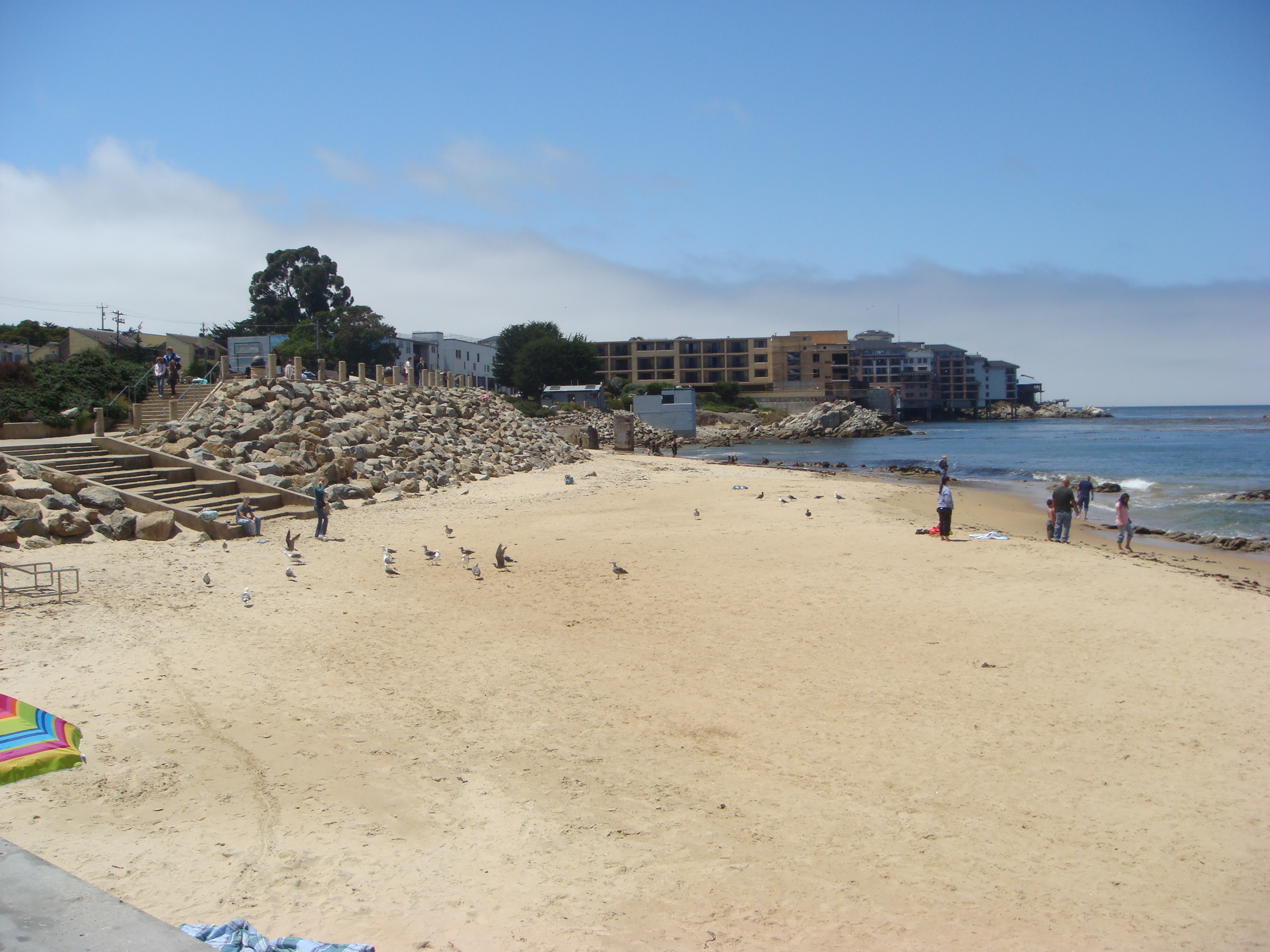
One of many beaches along the Monterey Bay coastline

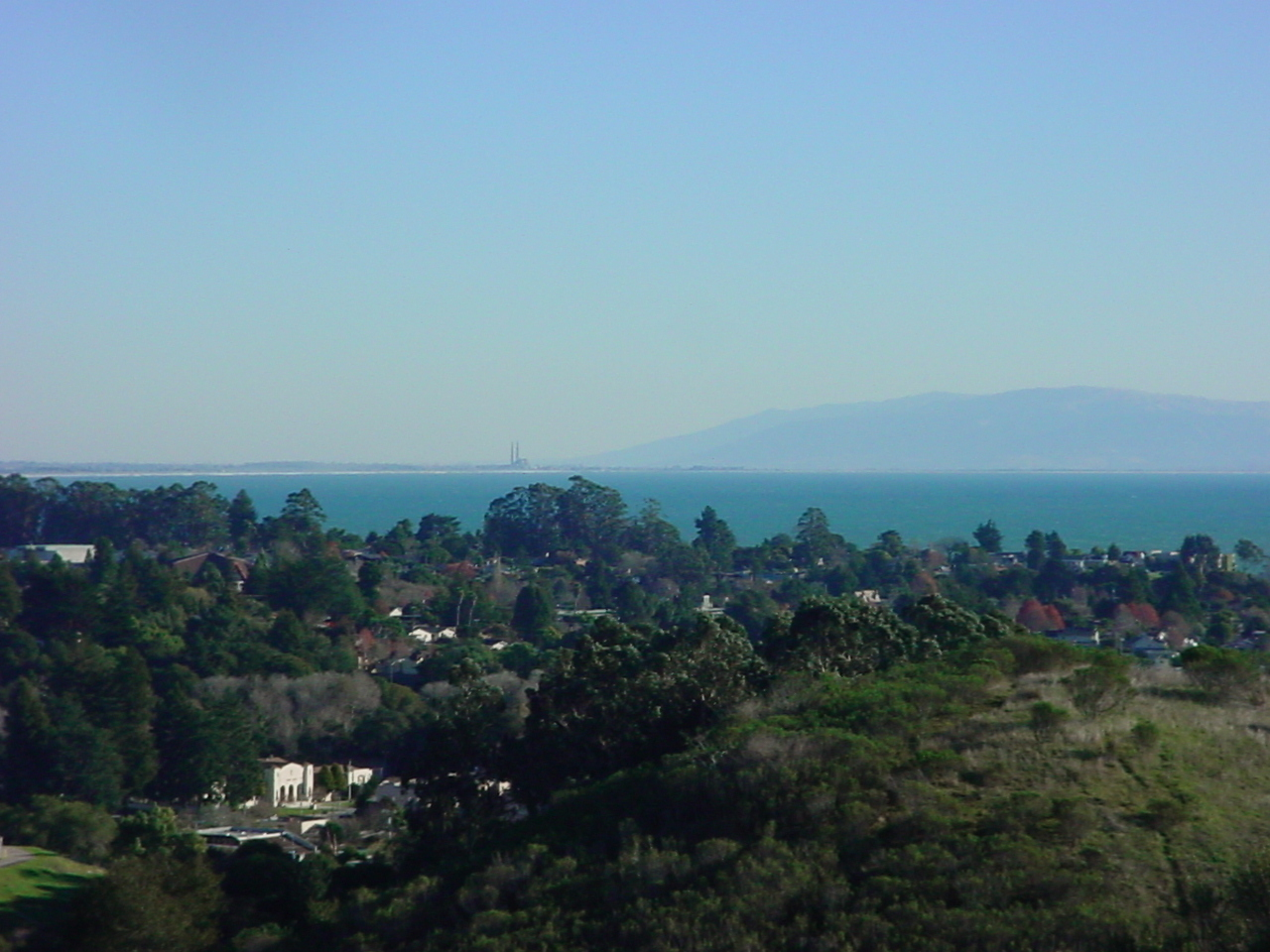
Monterey Bay as seen from Soquel, California. The Moss Landing power plant is visible in the distance.

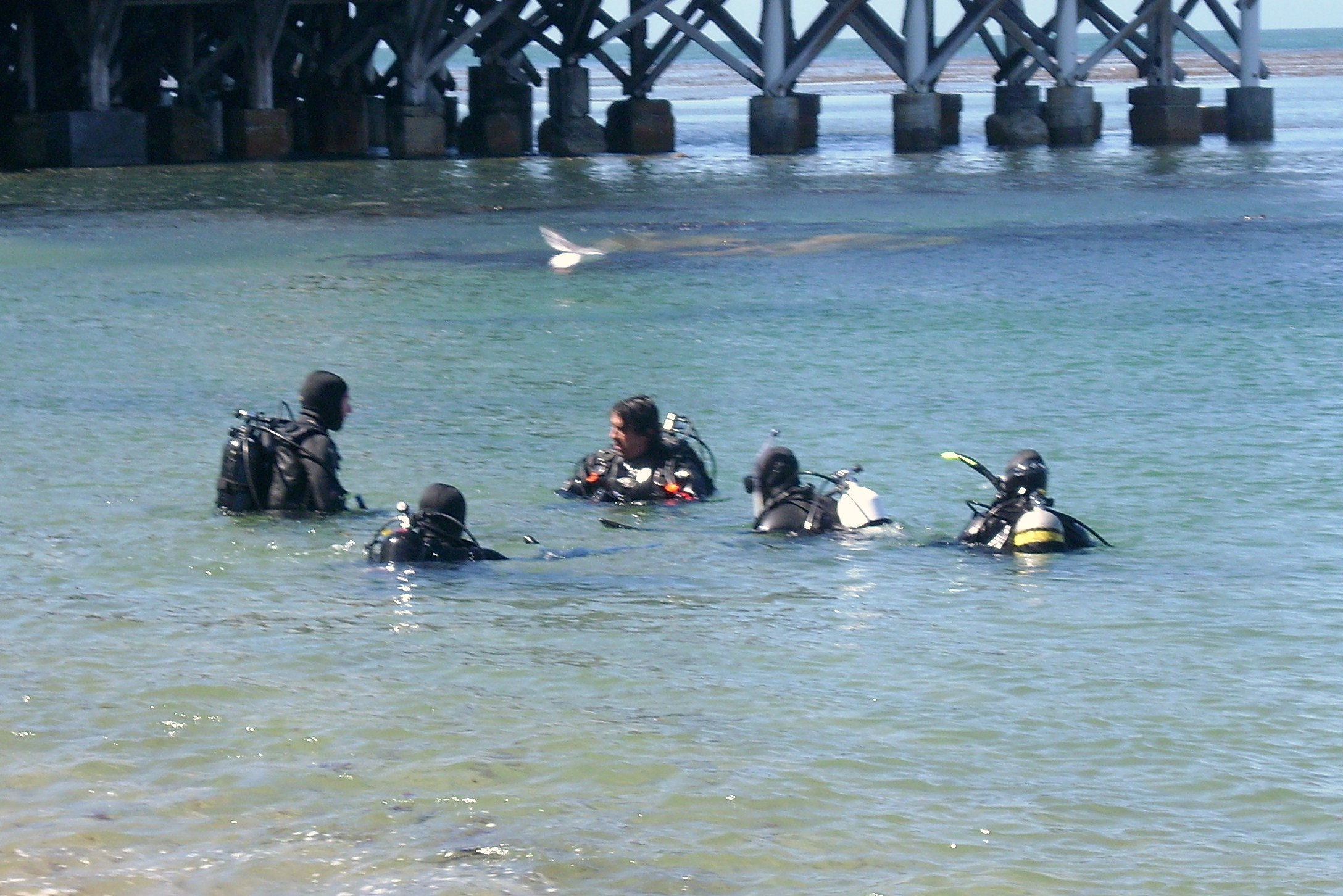
Scuba diving lessons in the bay, near Monterey, California

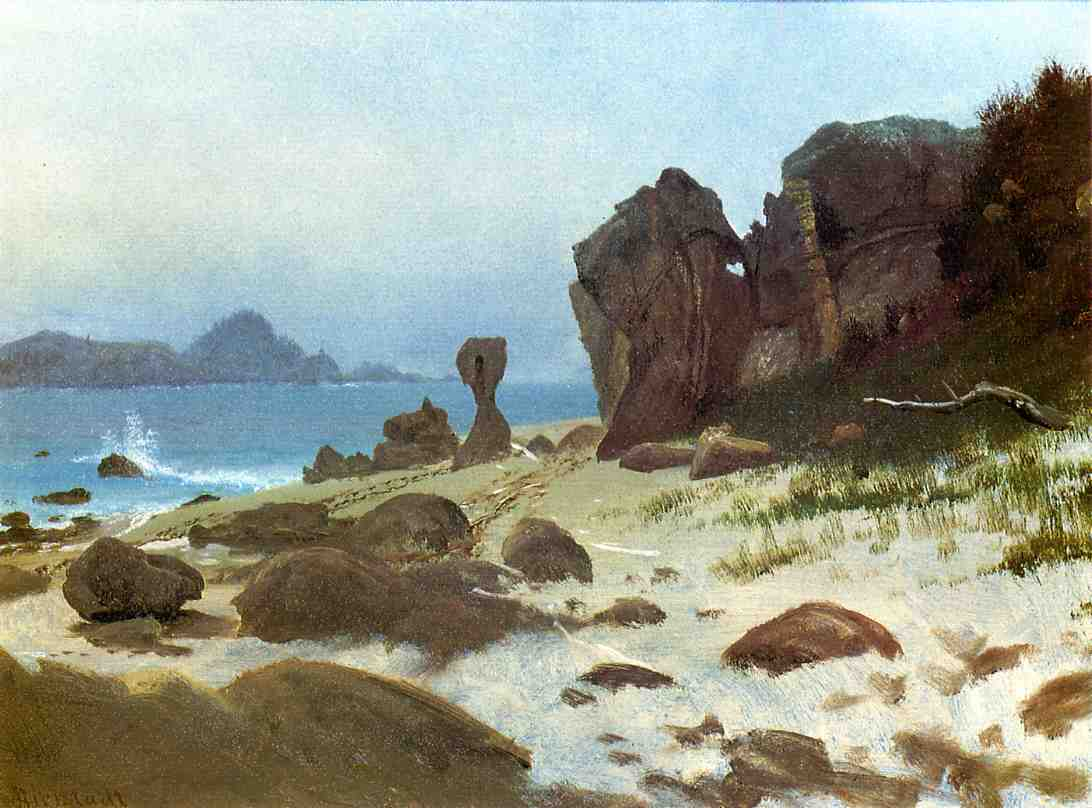
Albert Bierstadt, Bay of Monterey, oil on paper, undated

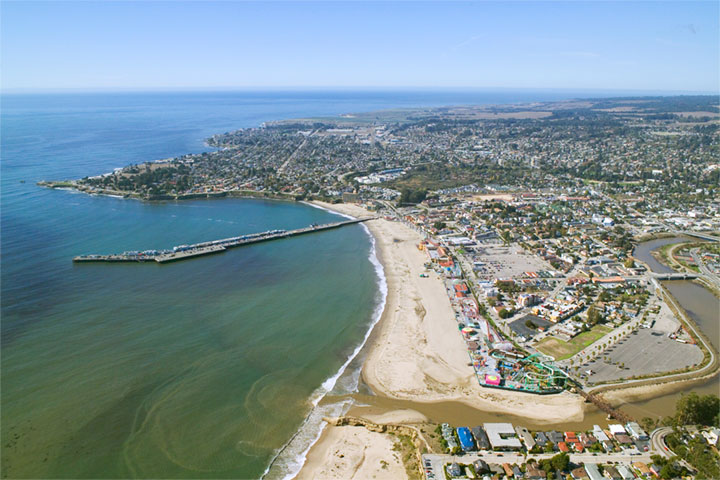
Aerial view of the north end of Monterey Bay at Santa Cruz

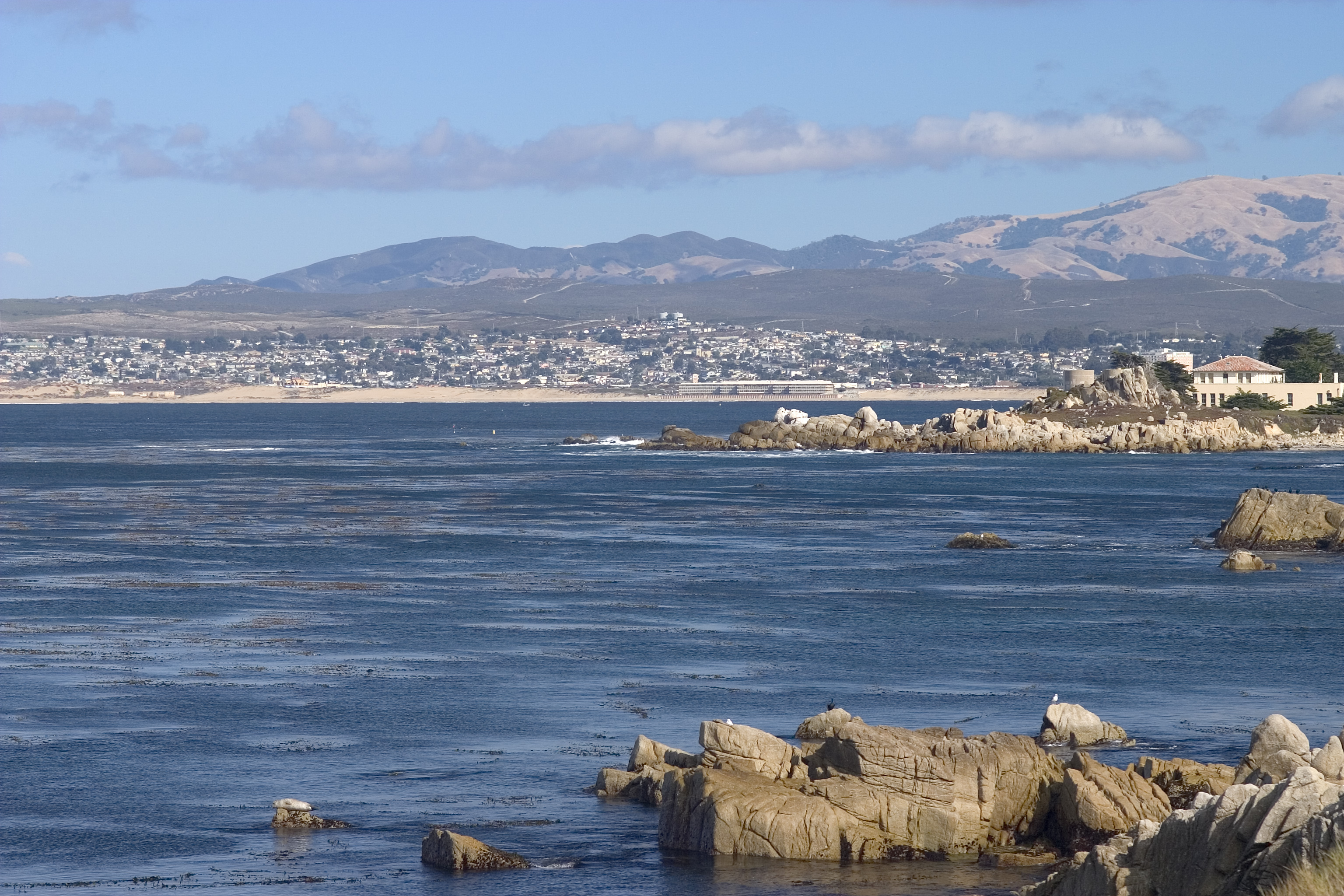

== See also ==
- California State University, Monterey Bay
- Monterey Bay Aquarium
