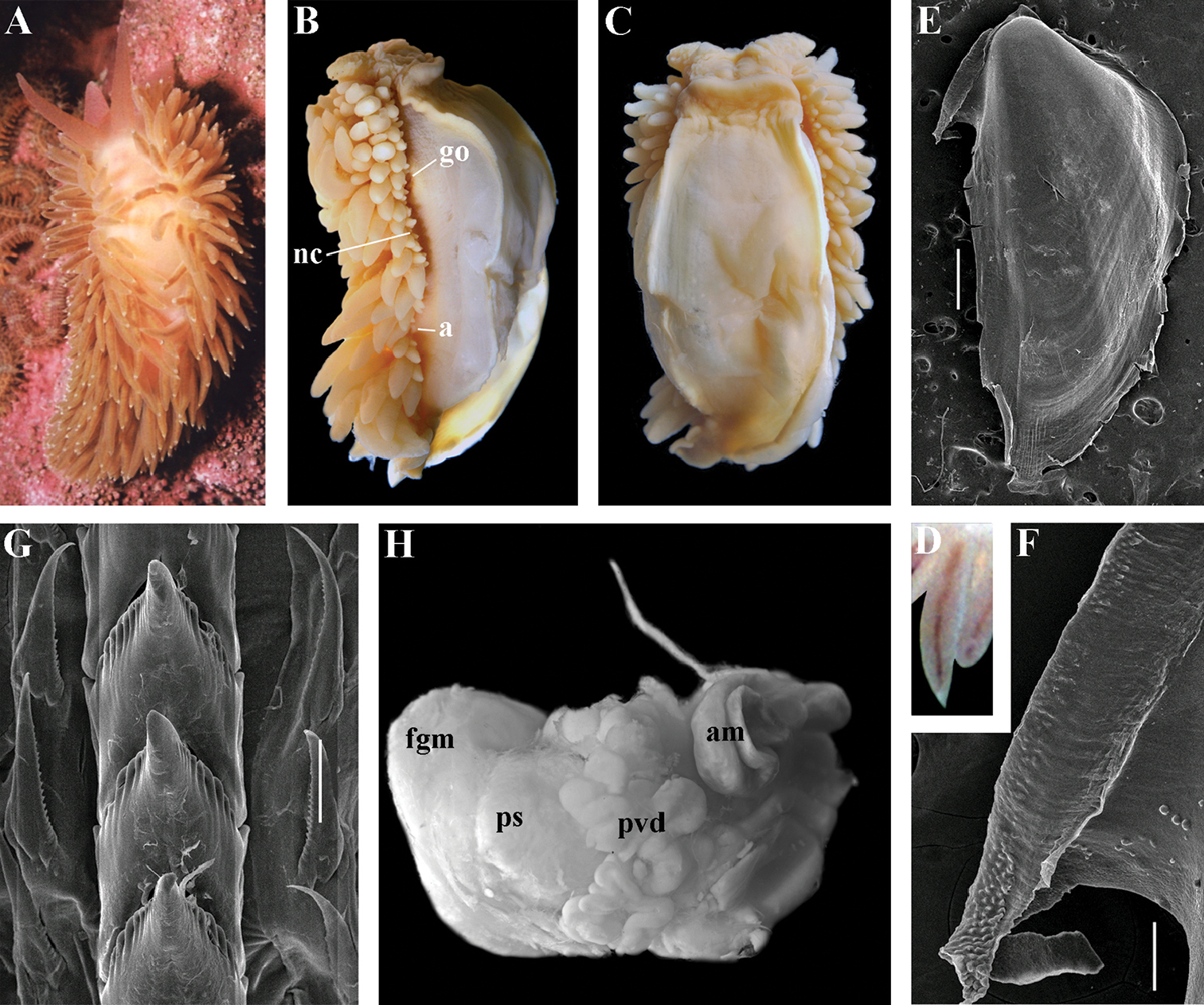
- Ziminella salmonacea

Scientific classification
- Kingdom: Animalia
- Phylum: Mollusca
- Class: Gastropoda
- Order: Nudibranchia
- Suborder: Aeolidacea
- Family: Flabellinidae
- Genus: Ziminella; Korshunova, Martynov, Bakken, Evertsen, Fletcher, Mudianta, Saito, Lundin, Schrödl & Picton, 2017

= Ziminella =

Genus of gastropods

Ziminella is a genus of sea slugs, specifically aeolid nudibranchs, marine gastropod molluscs in the family Flabellinidae.

== Species ==
Species within the genus Ziminella are as follows:

- Ziminella abyssa Korshunova, Martynov, Bakken, Evertsen, Fletcher, Mudianta, H. Saito, Lundin, Schrödl & Picton, 2017
- Ziminella circapolaris Korshunova, Martynov, Bakken, Evertsen, Fletcher, Mudianta, Saito, Lundin, Schrödl & Picton, 2017
- Ziminella japonica (Volodchenko, 1941)
- Ziminella salmonacea (Couthouy, 1838)
- Ziminella vrijenhoeki Valdés, Lundsten & N. G. Wilson, 2018
