= Monterey Canyon =

Submarine canyon in Monterey Bay, California

- Bathymetry of Monterey Bay, showing Monterey Canyon. Davidson Seamount is visible to the southwest on the abyssal plain.
- Interactive map of Monterey Canyon
- Coordinates: 36°36′N 122°20′W

Monterey Canyon, or Monterey Submarine Canyon, is a submarine canyon in Monterey Bay, California with steep canyon walls measuring a full 1 mile (1.6 km) in height from bottom to top, which rivals the depth of the Grand Canyon itself. It is the largest submarine canyon along the West coast of the North American continent, and was formed by the underwater erosion process known as turbidity current erosion. Many questions remain unresolved regarding the exact nature of its origins, and as such it is the subject of several ongoing geological and marine life studies being carried out by scientists stationed at the nearby Monterey Bay Aquarium Research Institute, the Moss Landing Marine Laboratories, and other oceanographic institutions.

Monterey Canyon begins at Moss Landing, California, which is situated along the middle of the coast of Monterey Bay, and extends horizontally 95 mi (153 km) under the Pacific Ocean, where it terminates at the Monterey Canyon submarine fan, reaching depths of up to 3,600 metres (11,800 ft) below surface level at its downstream mouth. It is a part of the greater Monterey Bay Canyon System, which consists of Monterey, Soquel, and Carmel Canyons. The canyon's depth and nutrient availability (due to the regular influx of nutrient-rich sediment) provide a habitat suitable for many marine life forms.

The Soquel Canyon State Marine Conservation Area protects a side-branch of the Monterey Submarine Canyon. Like an underwater park, this marine protected area helps conserve ocean wildlife and marine ecosystems.

== Geomorphology ==
While the erosion process of turbidity current erosion which once carved out the submarine Monterey Canyon is well known, the cause of the great depth and length of this canyon, carved out millions of years ago, and the unusually large size of the sedimentary deposit (fan) at its underwater mouth 95 mi (153 km) west of Monterey, have all been a cause for some speculation. Typically, submarine canyons of this depth and length which cut so far across a continental shelf, and with such large sedimentary fans attached, are only formed when aligned to receive the outflows of very major rivers, such as the Mississippi or the Amazon, and such canyons are not typically found in alignment with relatively low-flow rivers such as the Salinas River. The dominant theory is that it is the remnant outlet of a larger river that may have once drained the Central Valley, possibly even via the Los Angeles Basin (recalling that the canyon has steadily moved northwest due to fault action along the San Andreas fault). Research supports the latter due to the chemistry in iron-manganese deposits on seamounts near the Canyon indicating a sediment origin of southern Sierra Nevada or western Basin and Range. The Salinas River is thought to have been the outlet for prehistoric Lake Corcoran, which once occupied much of the Central Valley. The Upper Turbidite Unit of the Monterey submarine fan may have formed soon after Lake Corcoran found a new outlet and was catastrophically drained via what is now San Francisco Bay, when sediment from the former lake bed was carried out its new outlet and then down to Monterey Bay by longshore drift.

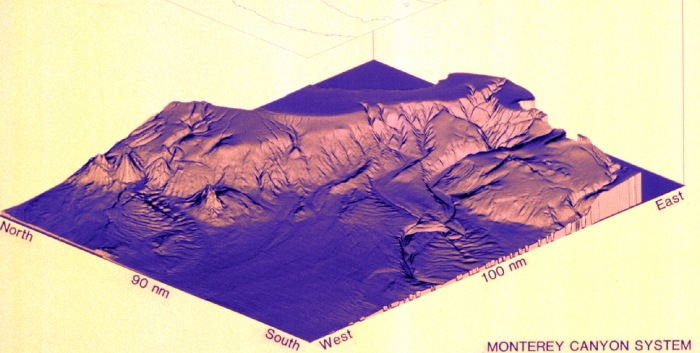
NOAA 3-D computer image depicting the Monterey Canyon system

Reconstructions of ancient land configurations via plate-tectonic theory indicate that the canyon has moved north to its current location via the horizontal slip-action of the San Andreas Fault and would have been approximately where Santa Barbara is located when both the San Andreas Fault and the Gulf of California came into being. Similar undersea canyons exist at the mouths of other large rivers around the world today, such as the Hudson Canyon. As no major river lies at the head of Monterey Canyon today, it is surmised that it may have come into being when such a river did so in the past.

The clues to the ancient origins of this canyon lie somewhere at the 2-mile-deep (3.2 km) downstream mouth of the canyon in a huge sedimentary bed called the Monterey Fan. This fan appears to be far too massive to have accumulated from the modern coastal streams. Research including core sampling is ongoing. Thus far, only "recent" sedimentary cores have been obtained. The oldest cores lie deeply buried, and remain to be probed. Once these deeper core samples have been properly analyzed and traced back to their original sedimentary sources, the answers to such speculations as to which river might have provided the high level of turbidity-current flows which are believed to have most probably been required to carve out such a deep and long canyon, with such a huge sedimentary deposit at its mouth, will all hopefully be finally resolved.
