= Paracoryphellidae =

- Salmon aeolis, Ziminella salmonacea

Scientific classification
- Kingdom: Animalia
- Phylum: Mollusca
- Class: Gastropoda
- Order: Nudibranchia
- Suborder: Aeolidacea
- Superfamily: Flabellinoidea
- Family: Paracoryphellidae; M. C. Miller, 1971

Type genus
- Paracoryphella

Genera
- See text

Family of gastropods

Paracoryphellidae is a taxonomic family of brightly coloured sea slugs, specifically nudibranchs, marine gastropod mollusks.

Ekimova et al. (2026) considers Paracoryphellidae to be a synonym of Flabellinidae.

== Genera ==
According to Korshunova et al. (2025), genera within the family Paracoryphellidae include:

- Chlamylla Bergh, 1886
- Mgueolia Korshunova et al., 2025
- Paracoryphella M. C. Miller, 1971
- Polaria Korshunova, Martynov, Bakken, Evertsen, Fletcher, Mudianta, Saito, Lundin, Schrödl & Picton, 2017
- Ziminella Korshunova, Martynov, Bakken, Evertsen, Fletcher, Mudianta, Saito, Lundin, Schrödl & Picton, 2017
