= Winter Nelis pear =

Edible fruit cultivar

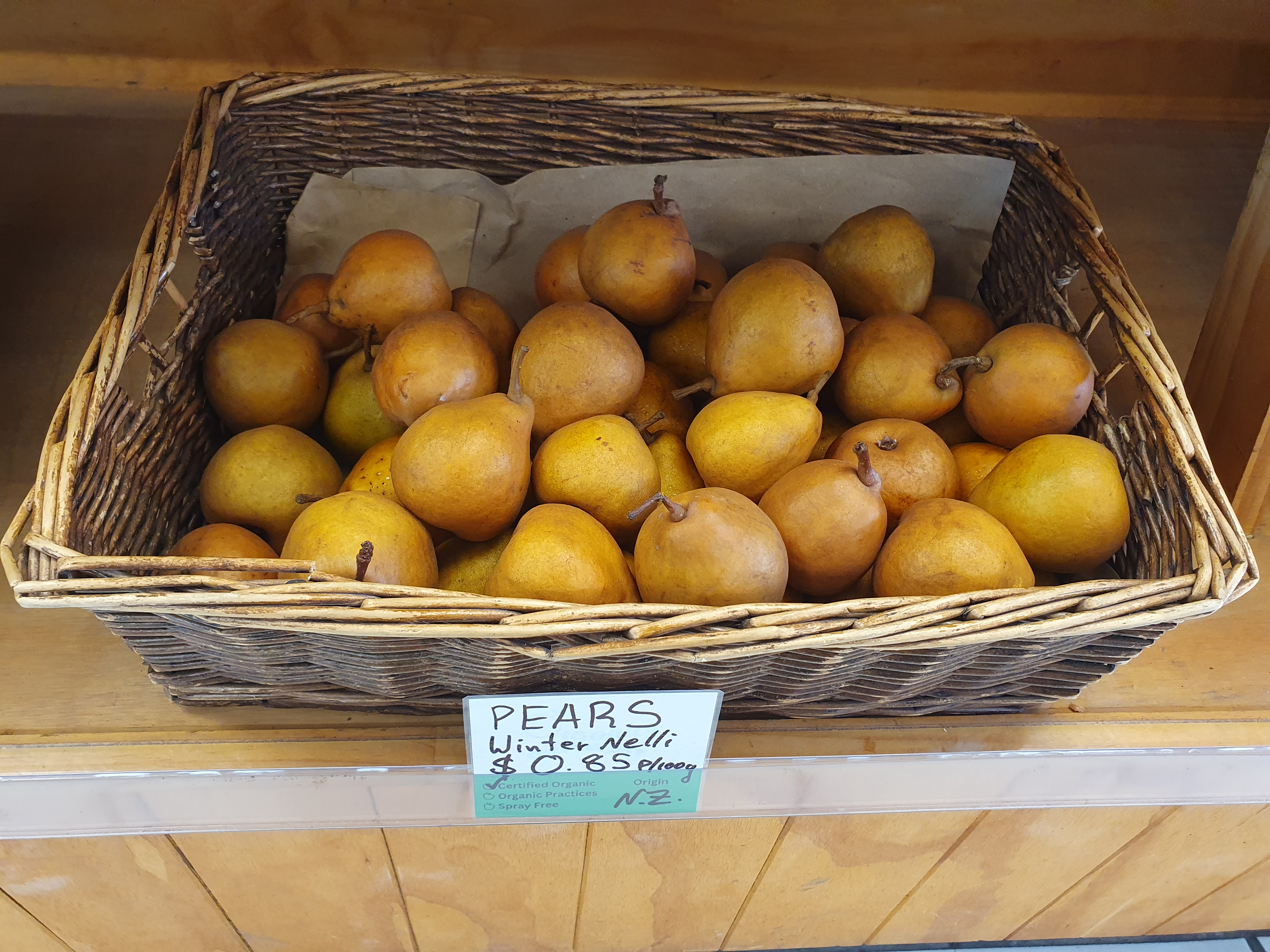
- Winter Nelis pears for sale in New Zealand
- Genus: Pyrus
- Species: Pyrus communis
- Cultivar: 'Winter Nelis'
- Breeder: Jean-Charles de Nelis
- Origin: Belgium, early 1800s

The Winter Nelis pear, also known as Bonne De Malines, is a deciduous pear tree growing to 8 m depending on rootstock, and is sparse and spreading in form. It is not frost tender. Its flowers are self-sterile and a pollinator tree is required that flowers at a similar time (its flowering group is D or 4). It is a late-season dessert pear picked in late autumn for use in early to mid-winter. The fruit are medium in size and have outstanding storage properties for a pear, easily keeping for a couple of months. Hoggs Fruit Manual (1880s) describes it as one of the richest flavoured pears, flesh being yellowish, fine-grained, buttery and melting, with a rich, sugary and vinous flavour and a fine aroma. The pear is suitable for both raw and cooked applications, alongside its impressive storage capacities this makes it an ideal pear for the home gardener. The pear is named after the Flemish nobleman Jean-Charles de Nelis (1748–1834), who raised it from seed in the early 1800s. It was introduced to England in 1818 and to the United States in 1823

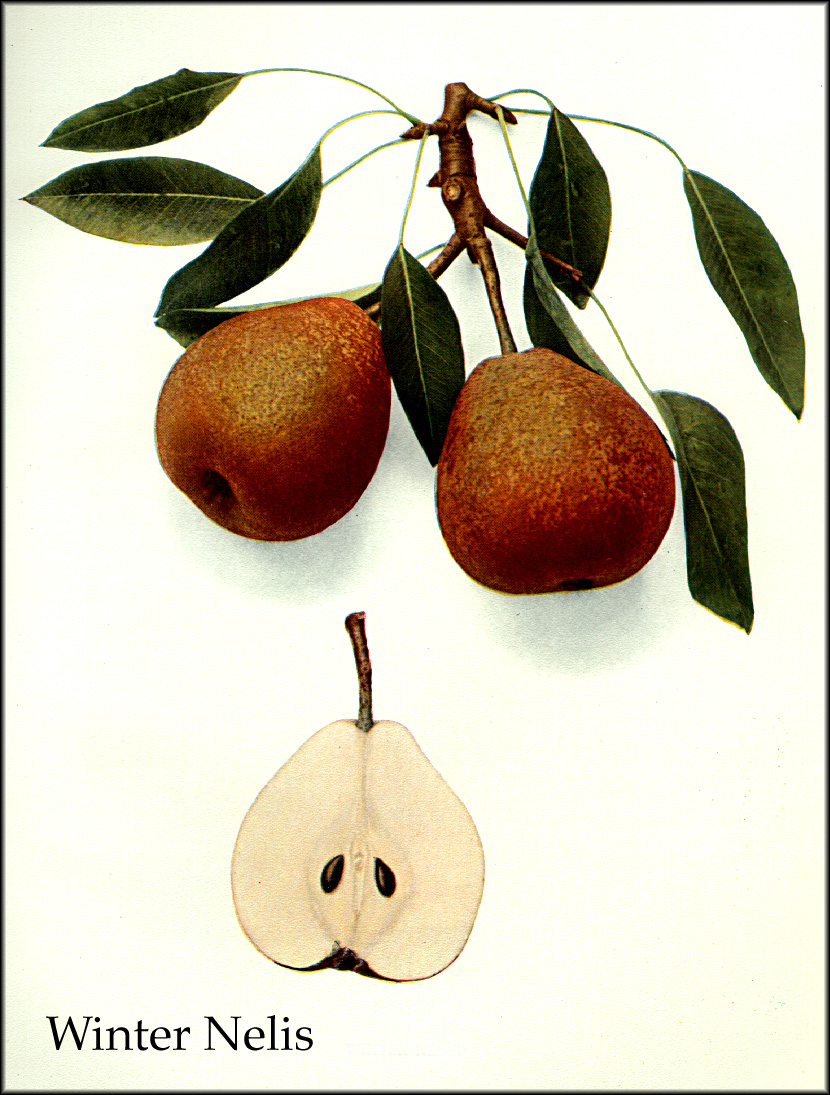
Winter Nelis pear, from The Pears of New York (1921) by Ulysses Prentiss Hedrick

In 1869, Edward Berwick planted the first commercial pear orchard on the Berwick Manor and Orchard in Carmel Valley, California, specializing in the Winter Nelis pear.
