= Windsor pear =

Cultivar of European pear

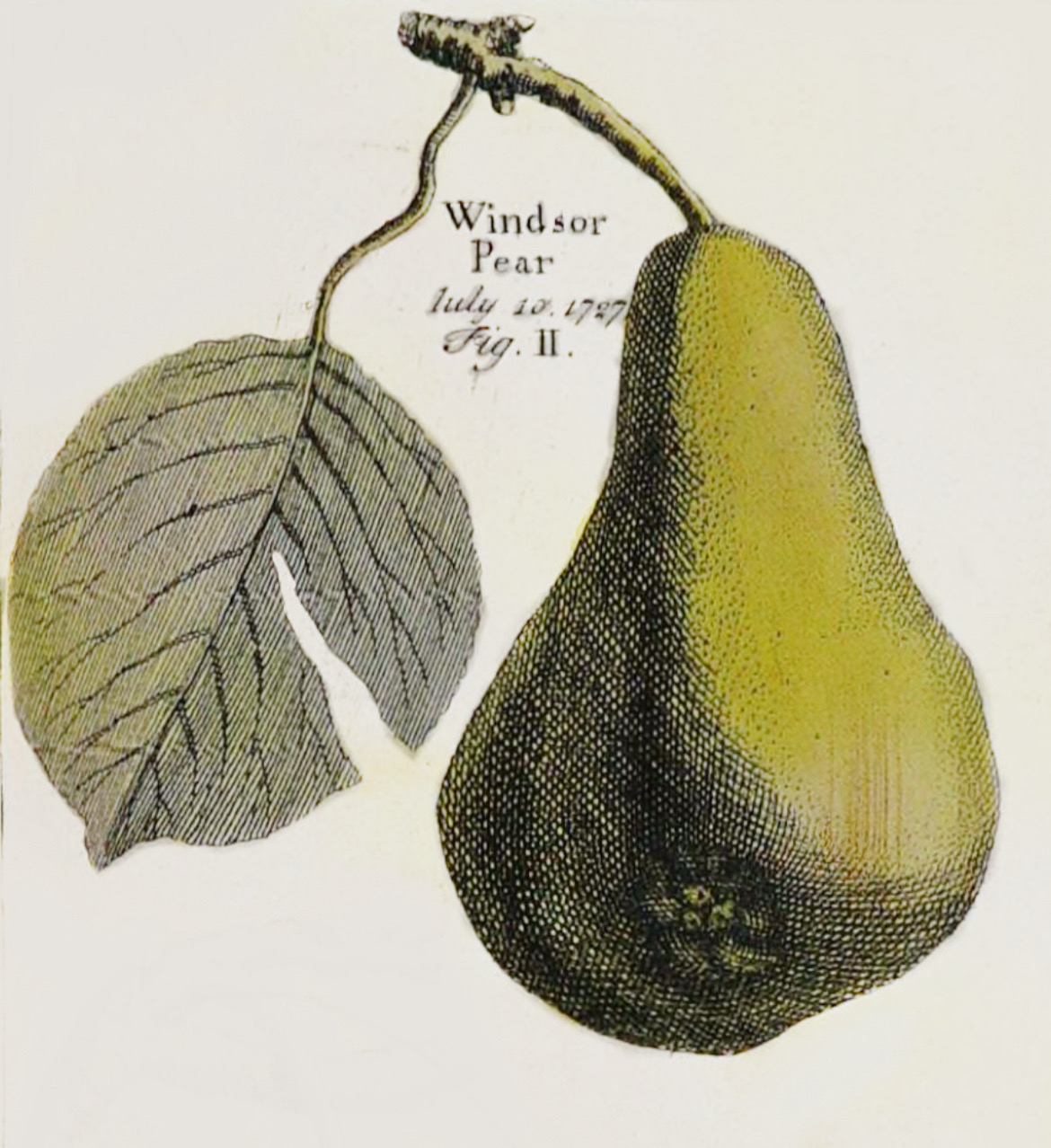
- Windsor pear in Batty Langley's Pomona (1729)
- Species: Pyrus communis
- Cultivar: 'Windsor'

The Windsor pear (Pyrus communis 'Windsor,' or Pyrum Windsorianum), also known as the Summer Bell, is an old cultivar of the European pear. Historically, the fruit has been known by various names, including Bell Tongue, Bellisime, Figue, Green Windsor, Grosse Jargonelle, Konge, Madame, Madame de France, and Suprême. During a second June bloom, the fruit, considered of little value at this stage, might also be called Poire Figue, Figue Musquée, and Deux fois l’an. The cultivar would come to be known in popular culture for its treatment in Georgian and Victorian satirical prints of royal couples.

== History ==
The Windsor is thought to have first been cultivated in England around 1563 and, according to Giambattista della Porta, was being grown in Naples by 1592 under the name Pero due volte l’anno ('pear twice a year'). In Floraes Paradise (1608), one of the earliest English references to the fruit, agricultural author Sir Hugh Plat describes how early- and frequent-bearing trees, such as the "pear trees upon Windsor-Hill, which bear three times in a year," when transplanted to richer soil, failed to remain equally abundant unless "the soil be of the same hot nature, and have the like advantages of situation, and other circumstances with those of Windsor." It is from these Windsor hills that the cultivar derives its common name.

The Windsor later appears in John Parkinson’s Paradisi in Sole Paradisus Terrestris (1629), where it is described as "an excellent good peare, well knowne to most persons," and one that will bear fruit "sometimes twice in a yeare, and (as it is said) three times in some places."

Under Charles II’s reign, (1660–1685) two Royal Windsor pear trees were planted in his orchard at a cost of twenty pence.

During the nineteenth century, competing narratives emerged regarding the fruit’s origin. According to André Leroy, the variety originated in Holland and was first published in 1771 by Johann Hermann Knoop under the name Hallemine Bonne. Robert Hogg, however, maintained that the only account of this ancient variety he had encountered was by an English writer, who described the Windsor as having been raised from the seed of the Cuisse Madame by "a person of the name of Williamson," described as a relation of Williamson, "whom Grimwood succeeded in the Kensington nursery." This likely refers to John Williamson, who is recorded as acquiring Kensington Nursery in 1756, followed by Bernard Williamson and later Daniel Grimwood in 1783.

As part of his series The Gardener's Assistant (1901), Robert Thompson puts forward a different chronology, suggesting that the "stately old Windsor Pear" originated in the warmer climate of France several centuries earlier.

== Characteristics ==
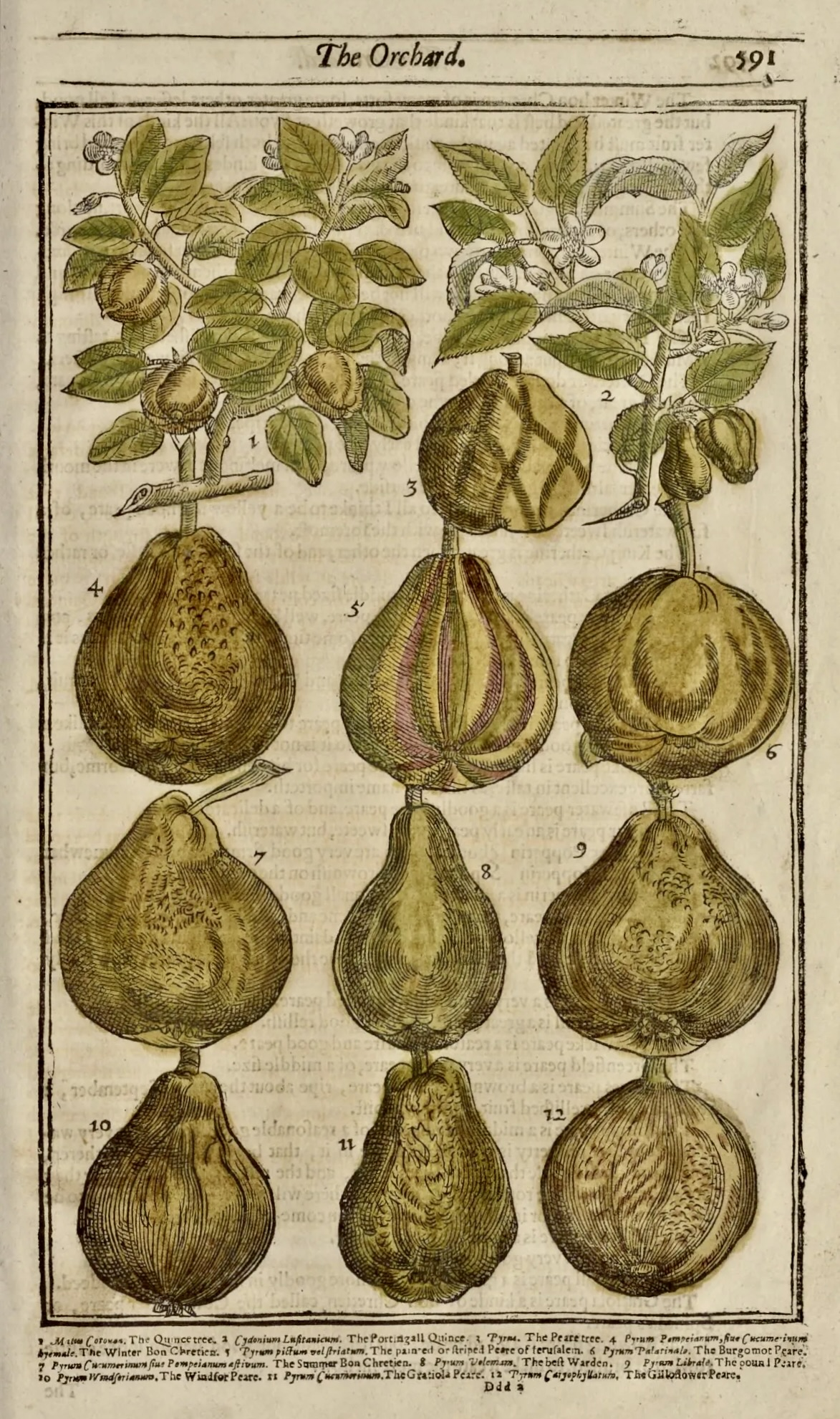
Fig 10. Pyrum Windsorianum, The Windsor Peare (1629)

Windsor pear trees are consistently described as stout and vigorous, with strong roots and white blossoms. The fruit, according to Hogg, is "large and handsome; pyriform, rounded at the eye," with smooth green skin that ripens to yellow, often streaked with orange and sometimes developing a red cheek. The stalk sits at around 1.5 inches and the calyx is small, revealing little to no indentation. The flesh is described as "white, tender, buttery, and melting, with a fine, brisk, vinous flavour, and nice perfume."

This is contradicted by reports that suggest that the pear can be coarse-grained and astringent to the point of inedibility unless cooked. During an 1862 proceedings meeting of The Farmer’s Club, committee members discussed the removal of the then-unpopular variant, noting that despite its classification as "second rate" in quality and its rejection by pomological standards, it was still regarded as "a good pear" by the public and worthy of cultivation.

Tilton’s Journal of Horticulture (1869) was more critical still, proposing that there was "not another pear half so poor as this which is so generally cultivated." The editor attributed its continued popularity to its high yields, and, for all its bounty, confessed to "a feeling of shame and disgust at our fellow-men when we see them buying and eating such trash."

== Cultivation and disease ==
The Windsor is best grown in alluvial or sandy-loam soils with a cool sub-soil. It is self-sterile and, as such, requires a compatible pollinator to produce a crop. The fruit ripens quickly from late July to August and is best gathered before it turns yellow and begins to rot at the core. It is typically eaten within a few days of harvesting, as it has a tendency to become mealy once fully mature. The tree's fruit stems are weak, and the pears are often picked before ripening to prevent them from falling and being spoiled.

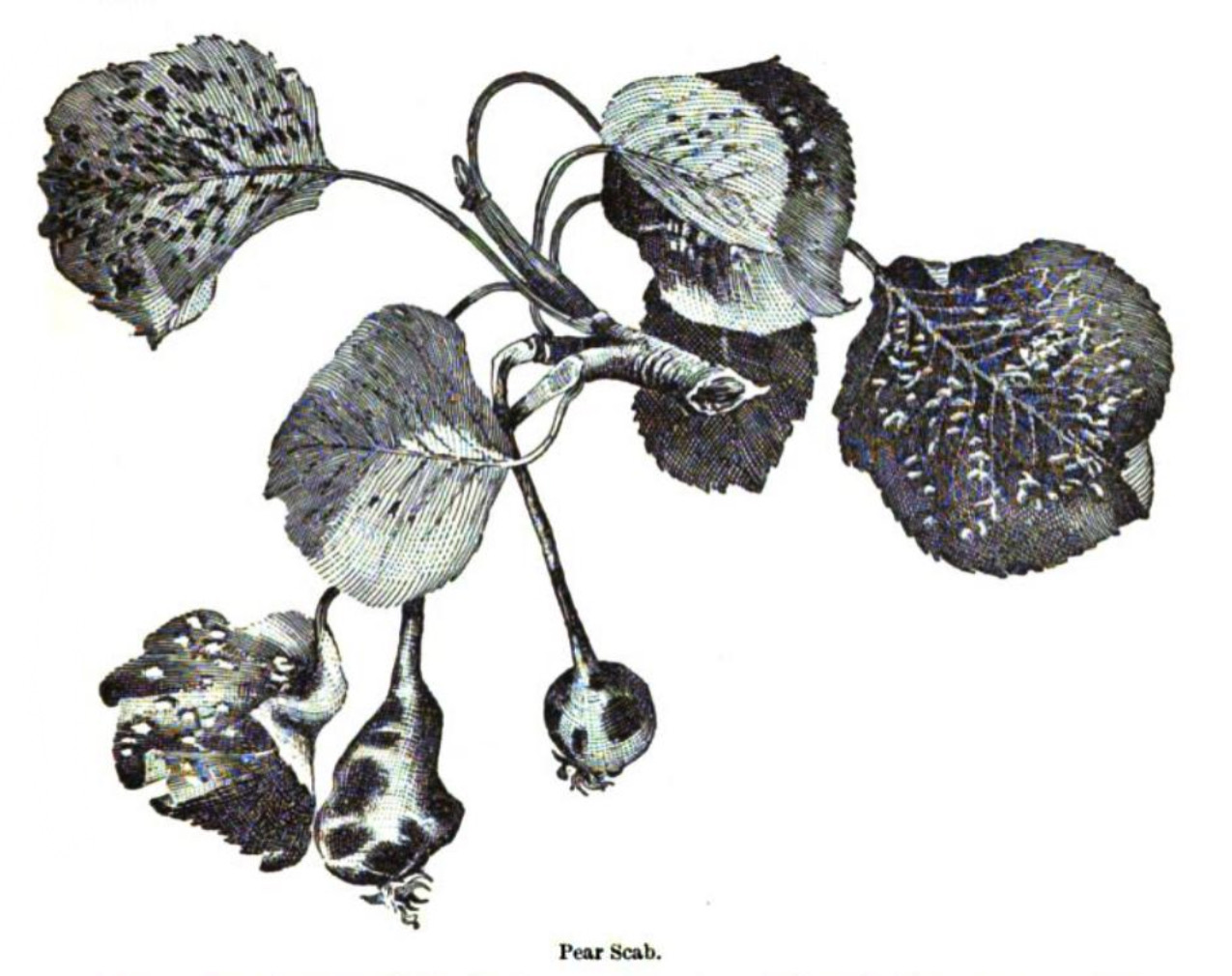
Pear scab (1898)

During the 1890s Windsor pear trees in parts of New South Wales Australia, beginning in Cootamundra, became severely affected by a fungal blight referred to colloquially as pear scab or pear blight. The cause was identified as Fusicladium pyrinum (now Venturia pyrina) and Fusicladium dendriticum (now Venturia inaequalis). The fungus first appears in dark patches upon leaves and fruit, which then scab over and cause the resulting spotted fruit to fall.

The Agricultural Gazette described Windsor pears as harbouring "a thousandfold more of this particular disease" than any other tree, calling it "the most serious disease of the pear that we know in this part of the world." It was reported that 10,000 acres of orchards were left abandoned and rotting due to the outbreak, costing thousands to the county of Cumberland alone.

A copper pesticide treatment was proposed, consisting of a solution of copper sulphate, sodium carbonate, and ammonia, diluted with water, to be applied every few days. But by 1940 demand for the Windsor had declined significantly and the sweeter Bartlett pear had taken its place as the leading commercial variety.

== The Windsor 'Pair' ==
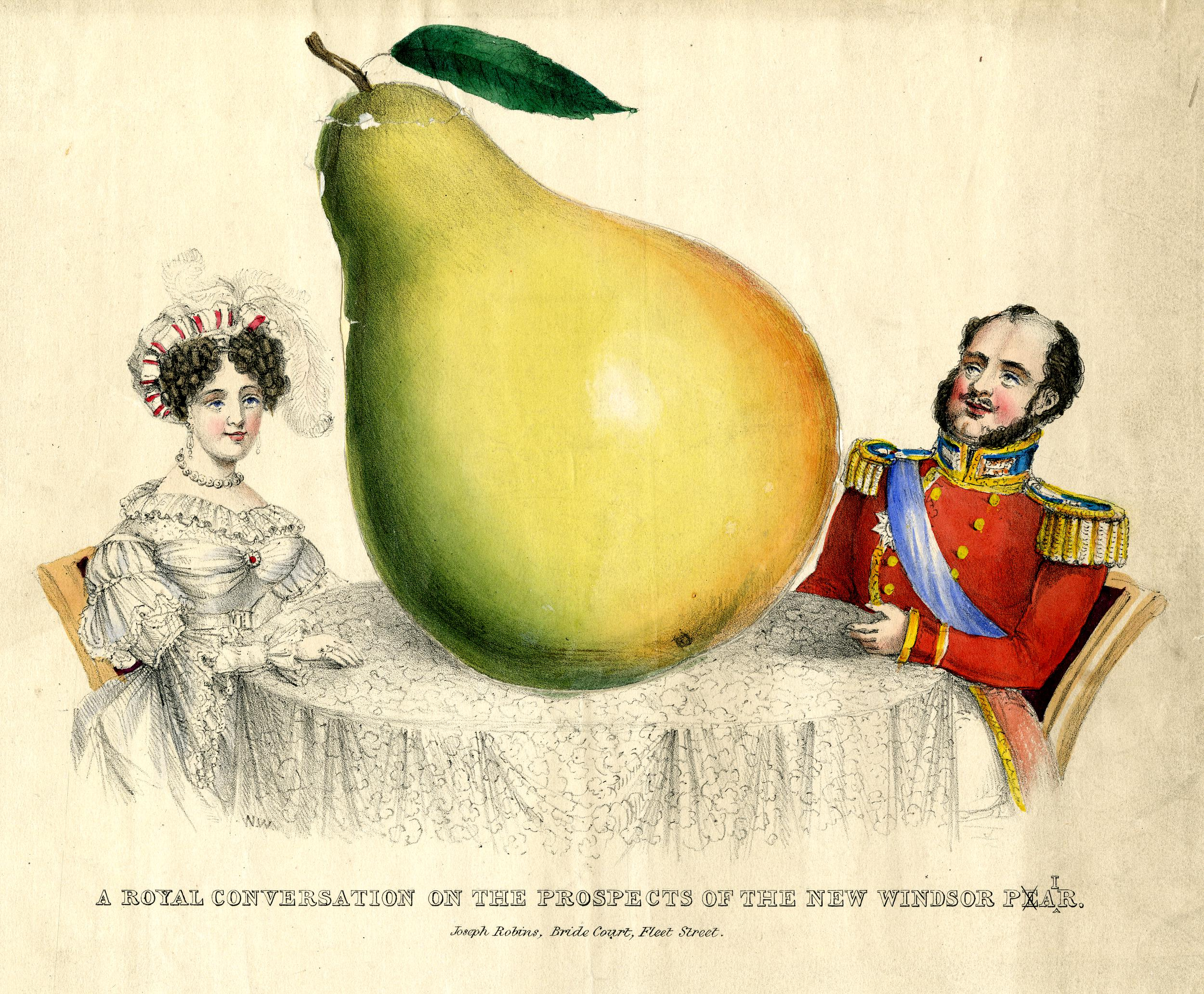
A royal conversation on the prospects of the new Windsor ~~Pear~~ Pair (c. 1818-19)

Throughout the nineteenth century, satirical prints of royal couples that played upon the phonetic homonym of pear and pair became popular within Britain’s print trade. Among the earliest of these was an 1819 lithograph depicting the Duke and Duchess of Kent seated at a table upon which rests a large Windsor pear, symbolic of the Duchess’s pregnancy. The ripe pear soon to be born would become Queen Victoria.

In 1828 Thomas Howell Jones produced a print mocking King George IV and his alleged mistress, the actress Eliza Chester, at Windsor. Above the 'Windsor Pair' dangles the forbidden fruit, here refigured as an oversized pear. Dressed in a wide-brimmed gardening hat, the King serenades Chester, reciting lines from Ben Jonson’s Drink to Me Only with Thine Eyes, encouraging her to leave him a kiss within her cup and declaring that, if she would, he would need not seek the divine "Jove’s nectar."

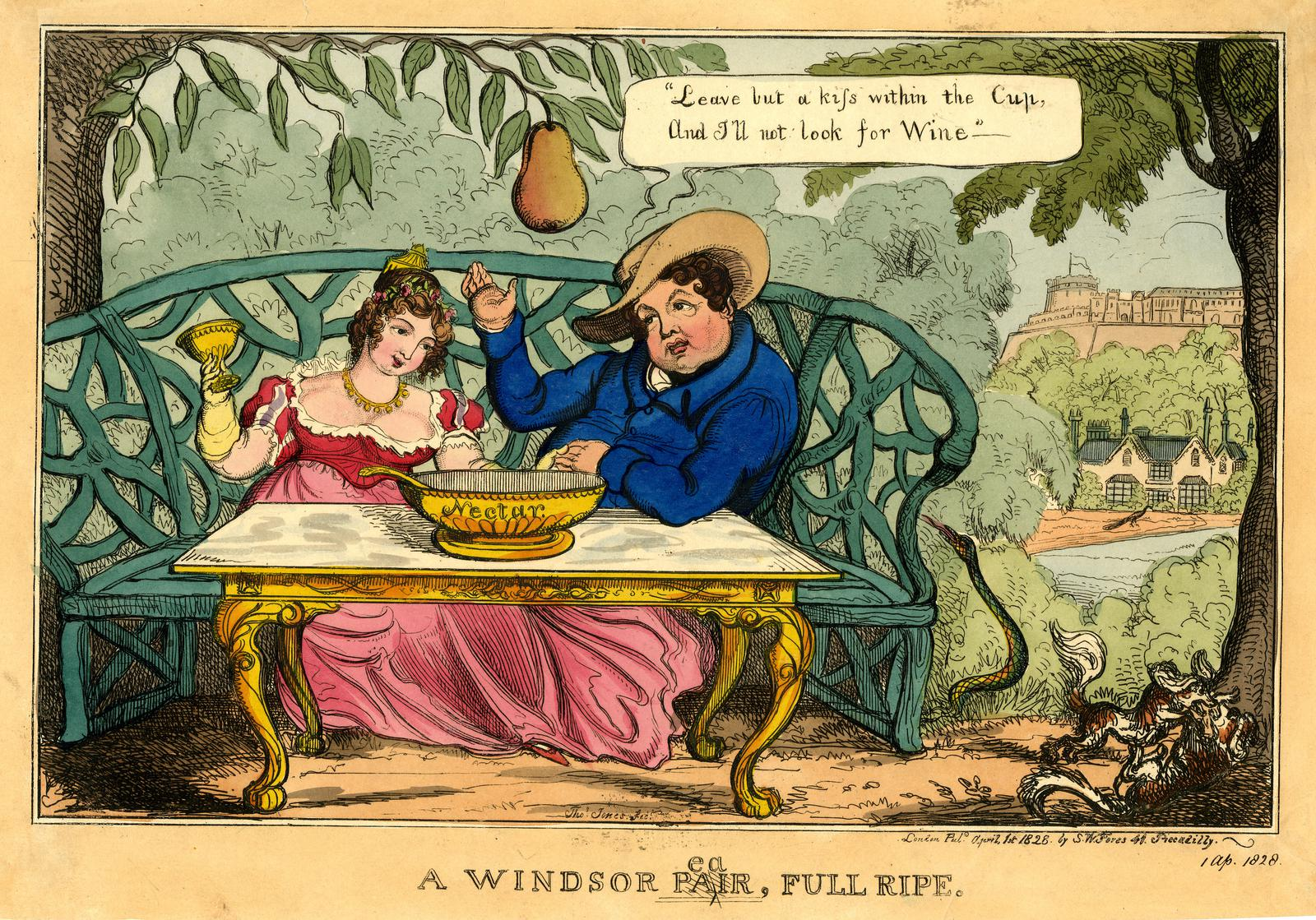
A Windsor ~~Pair~~ Pear, Full Ripe (1828)

In 1830, William IV and his wife Adelaide ascended the English throne.

During the early years of his reign, as the new king sought to secure public approval, the popularity of novelty prints with moving parts also surged. In 1833, Thomas Jones produced an etching of the Windsor pair concealed beneath the Windsor pear, "Daily seen at the Royal Table."

Following the wedding of Queen Victoria and Prince Albert in 1840, shops sold thousands of Windsor pear cards at a penny a piece to commemorate the union, often hand-coloured and featuring a pear-shaped flap that, when lifted, revealed portraits of the royal couple. As Edmund Yates later recalled in his autobiography, the windows of stationers' shops were filled with "a mild pictorial joke, 'The Windsor Pear' – a representation of a fine specimen of the fruit, with what theatrical people would call a 'practical' rind, which, being lifted, discovered portraits of the Queen and Prince inside."

During this period colour prints of the royal family were immensely popular and increasingly inventive. In one such lithograph by T. Lawson, the royal portrait was revealed not by a hinged flap, but through light shining through the translucent paper.

In 1863, Edward VII and Alexandra of Denmark likewise received the 'royal pair' treatment, their marital portrait rendered in a gold-embossed lithograph commemorating their wedding at Windsor Castle that same year.

Royal Windsor 'Pairs'

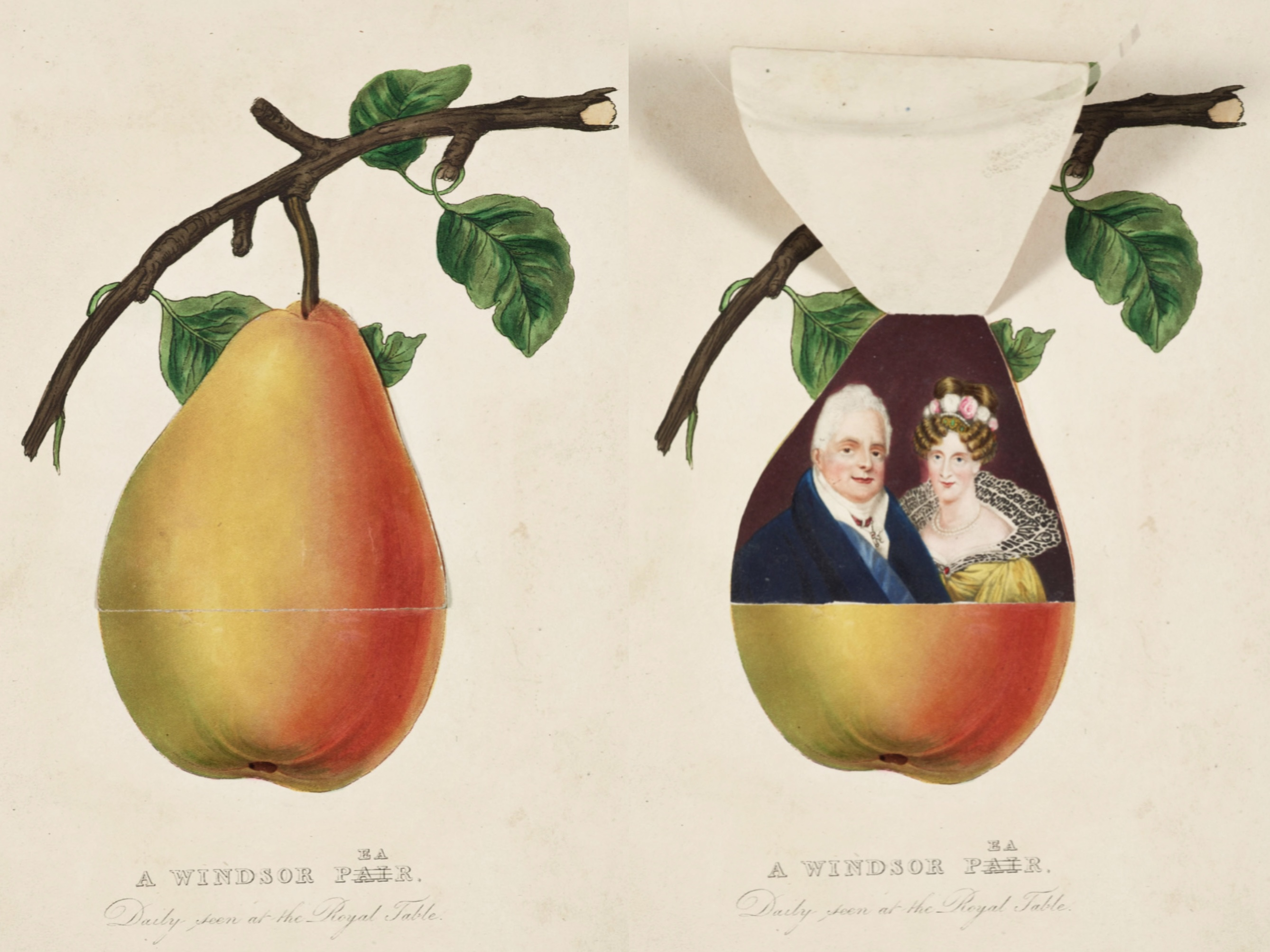
King William IV and Queen Adelaide (1833)

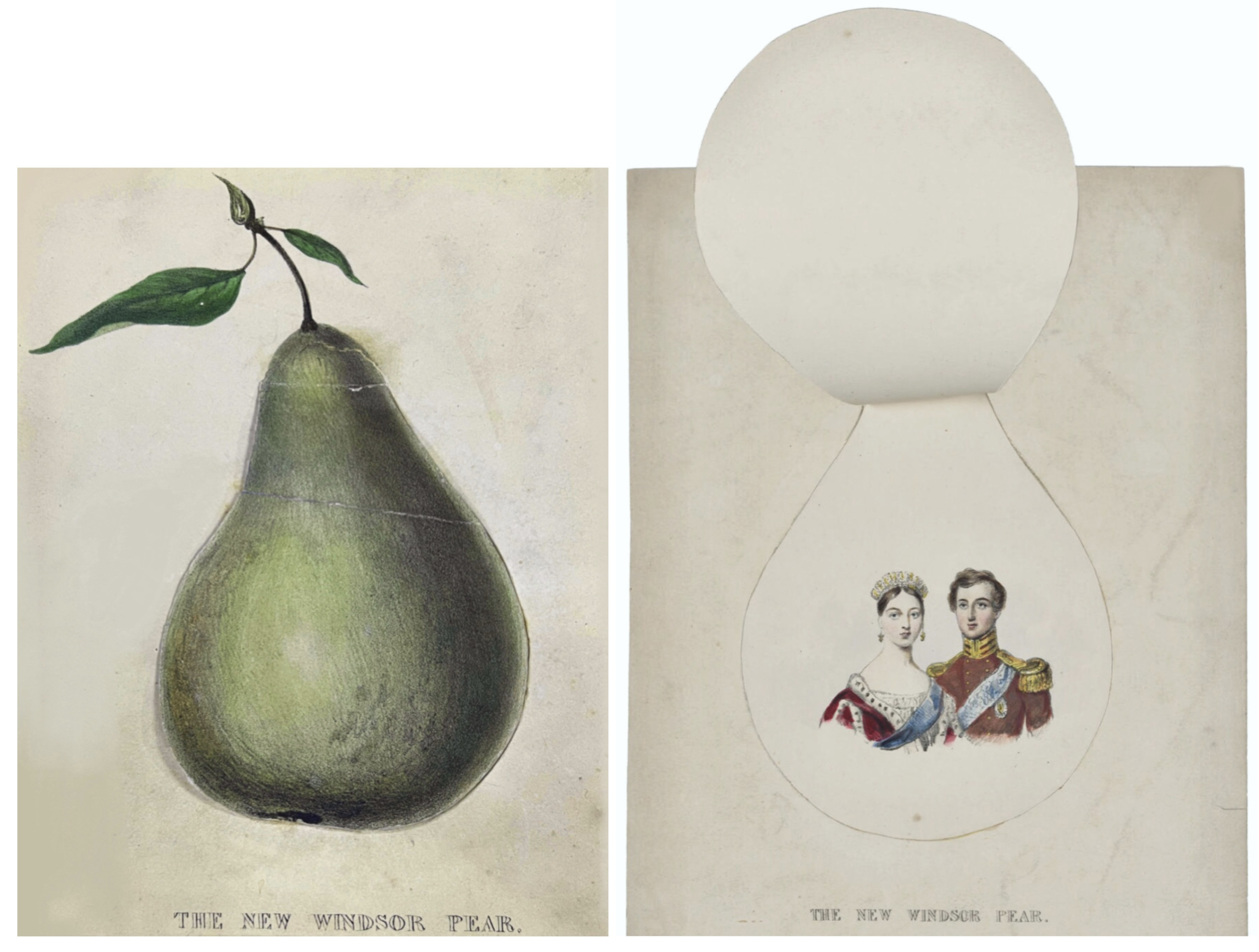
Queen Victoria and Prince Albert (c. 1840)

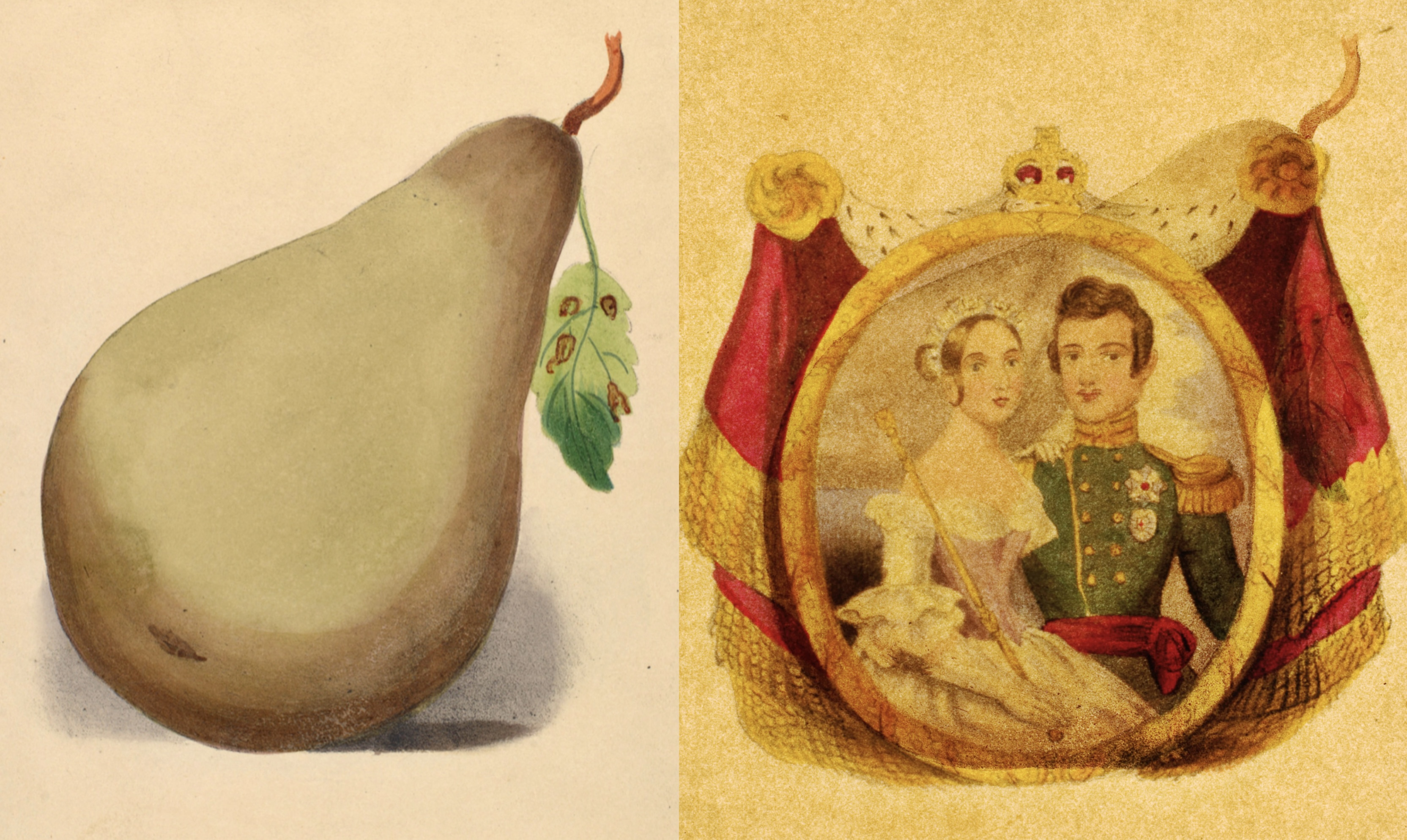
Queen Victoria and Prince Albert (c. 1837-40)

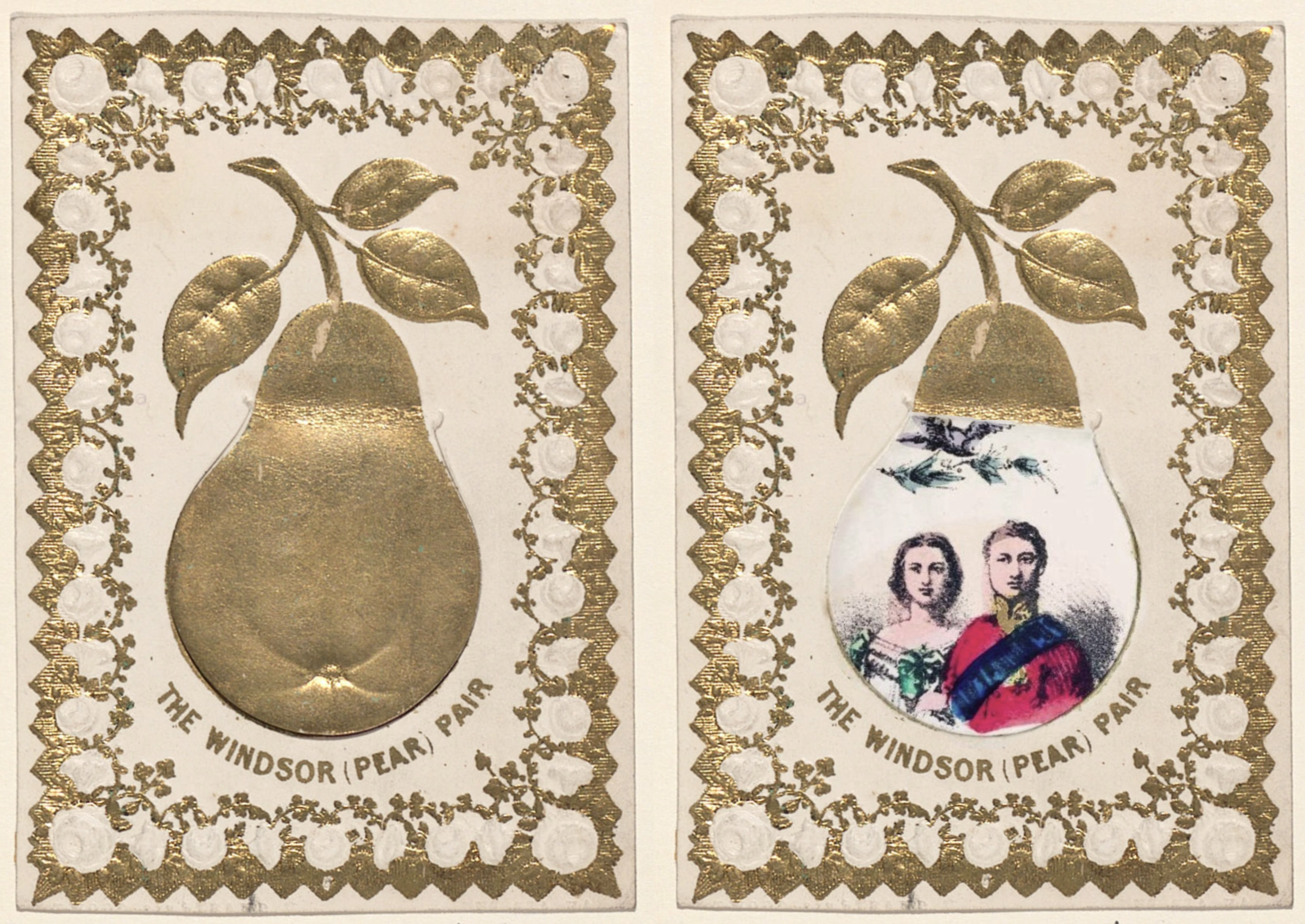
King Edward VII and Queen Alexandra (1863)

== Literary References ==
=== Mary Botham Howitt, 'The Hornet' (1838) ===
Poet Mary Botham Howitt, best known for The Spider and the Fly, references the Windsor pear in her poem 'The Hornet,' published in Birds and Flowers and Other Country Things (1838). The poem takes the form of a soliloquy in which a schoolboy comes upon a hornet's net and fantasises watching the "great wasp-King" grow faint with the intoxicating sweetness of the pear's juice.

You’re not so very spiritual, but soon some sunny morning

I may find you in a green-gage, and give you little warning;

Or feeding in a Windsor pear; or at the juicy stalk

Of my negro-boy, grand dahlia, — too heavy much to walk;

Ay, very much too heavy, — that juicy stem deceives, —

“Makes faint with too much sweet such heavy-winged thieves.”

Too heavy much to walk, — then, pray, how can you fly?

No, there you’ll drop upon the ground, and there you're doomed to die!

=== Charles Dickens, All the Year Round (1868) ===
Charles Dickens’s periodical All the Year Round celebrates the Windsor pear in a reflective passage on the pome, praising the "primitive simplicity" of fruit as a natural food source and suggesting that within it lies "essences never discovered, and wines as yet undreamed of."

"But after all what can equal a good pear, for a real meal of fruit? How it dissolves on being touched by the teeth! What a flavour it has! What a vast difference between a melting Swan's egg, and a Beurre, or a Marie Louise, yet how impossible to describe the difference in words, however subtle. How richly mellow a Windsor pear is, yet how unlike a Bergamot, and still there is to both flavours a common generic character."

=== Amy Walton, The Hawthorns (1886) ===
Children's author Amy Catherine Walton, best known as Mrs O. F. Walton, opens her novel The Hawthorns (1886) with a description of the nearby vicarage pear tree and its characteristic early-ripening fruit.

"It was so old that the ivy had had time to hug its trunk with strong rough arms, and even to stretch them out nearly to the top, and hang dark green wreaths on every bough. Some day, the children had been told, this would choke the life out of the tree and kill it; that would be a pity, but there seemed no danger of it yet, for every spring the pear-tree still showed its head crowned with white blossoms, and every summer the pears grew yellow and juicy, and fell with a soft "splosh!" on the gravel path beneath. It was interesting to watch that, and it happened so often, that it was hard to imagine a windsor pear without a great gash where the sharp stones had cut into it; it was also natural to expect when you picked it up that there would be a cunning yellow wasp hidden somewhere about it"
