= Eliza Chester =

English actress (1799–1859)

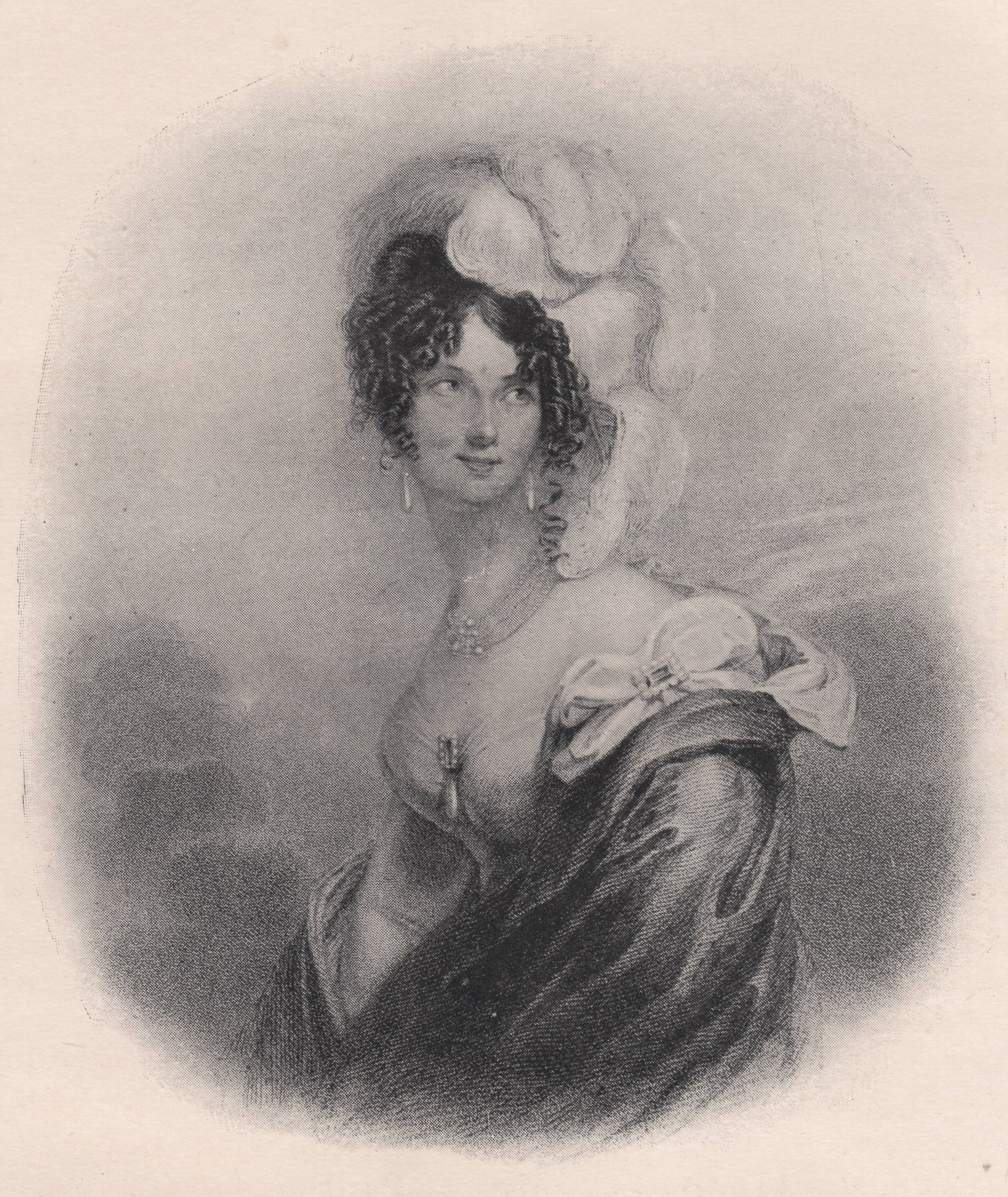
Eliza Chester portraying Miss Teazle

Eliza Jane Chester (1799–1859) was an English actress known for playing roles in the plays of Shakespeare and Richard Brinsley Sheridan.

Chester was also a sitter for some of the artists of the day. Her image in art was created by three artists, all of whom took her role as Beatrice in Much Ado About Nothing as their inspiration; they were Alfred Edward Chalon in 1823, Thomas Woolnoth in 1823, and John Cochran in 1825.

Chester became so well known to contemporary society that in 1828 satirist Thomas Jones made an engraving of King George IV sitting beneath a pear tree with "the beautiful actress-mistress, Eliza Chester". A huge pear hangs over the heads of the couple, a possible reference to marital infidelity, and the monarch is singing lyrics from Ben Jonson's Song to Celia, "Leave but a Kiss within the Cup, and I'll look not for Wine". The title of the caricature piece is 'A Windsor ~~PAIR~~'/ PEAR, Full Ripe,' one of several royal satirical prints that played upon the phonetic homonym of the Windsor Pear cultivar.

In 1838, Chester bought Wentworth Place; the poet John Keats had lived there in 1819–1820. Chester had the two villas made into one larger dwelling, adding a drawing room and stables.
