= Edward Berwick (farmer) =

American farmer (1843-1934)

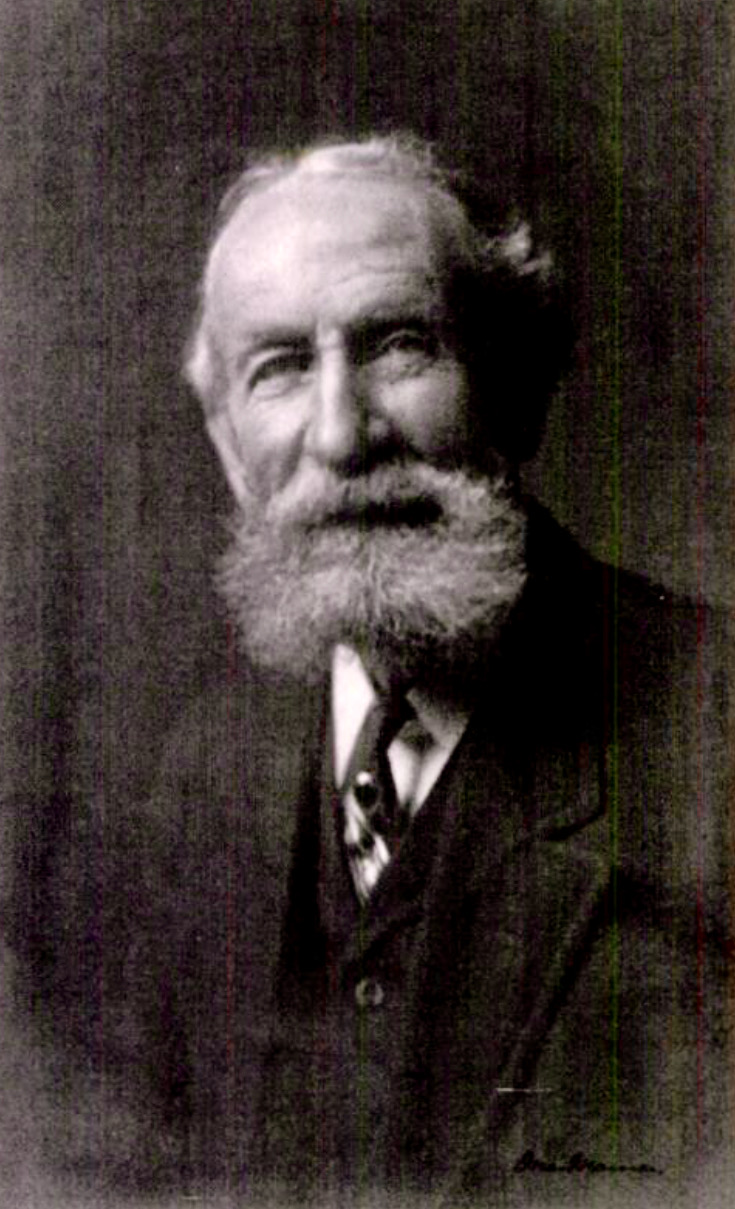
- Edward Berwick
- Born: January 25, 1843; St George Hanover Square, London, England
- Died: January 28, 1934 (aged 91); Monterey, California, US
- Occupations: Farmer, Writer, Speaker
- Spouse: Isabella Richardson
- Children: 3

Edward Berwick (January 25, 1843 – January 28, 1934) was an American farmer who raised crops, orchards, and livestock. He settled in Carmel Valley, California in 1869 and developed the Berwick Manor and Orchard. He planted the first commercial pear orchard, specializing in the Winter Nelis pear. He was nationally known for his work for peace and the parcel post.

== Early life ==
Berwick was born in London, England on January 25, 1843. He was the son of James Berwick and Nacy Mary Handley.

Berwick and his wife had three children. Their son, Edward Berwick Jr., died on February 5, 1909, at age 34, when he was engaged to Edith Jordan, daughter of Stanford University President David Starr Jordan.

== Career ==
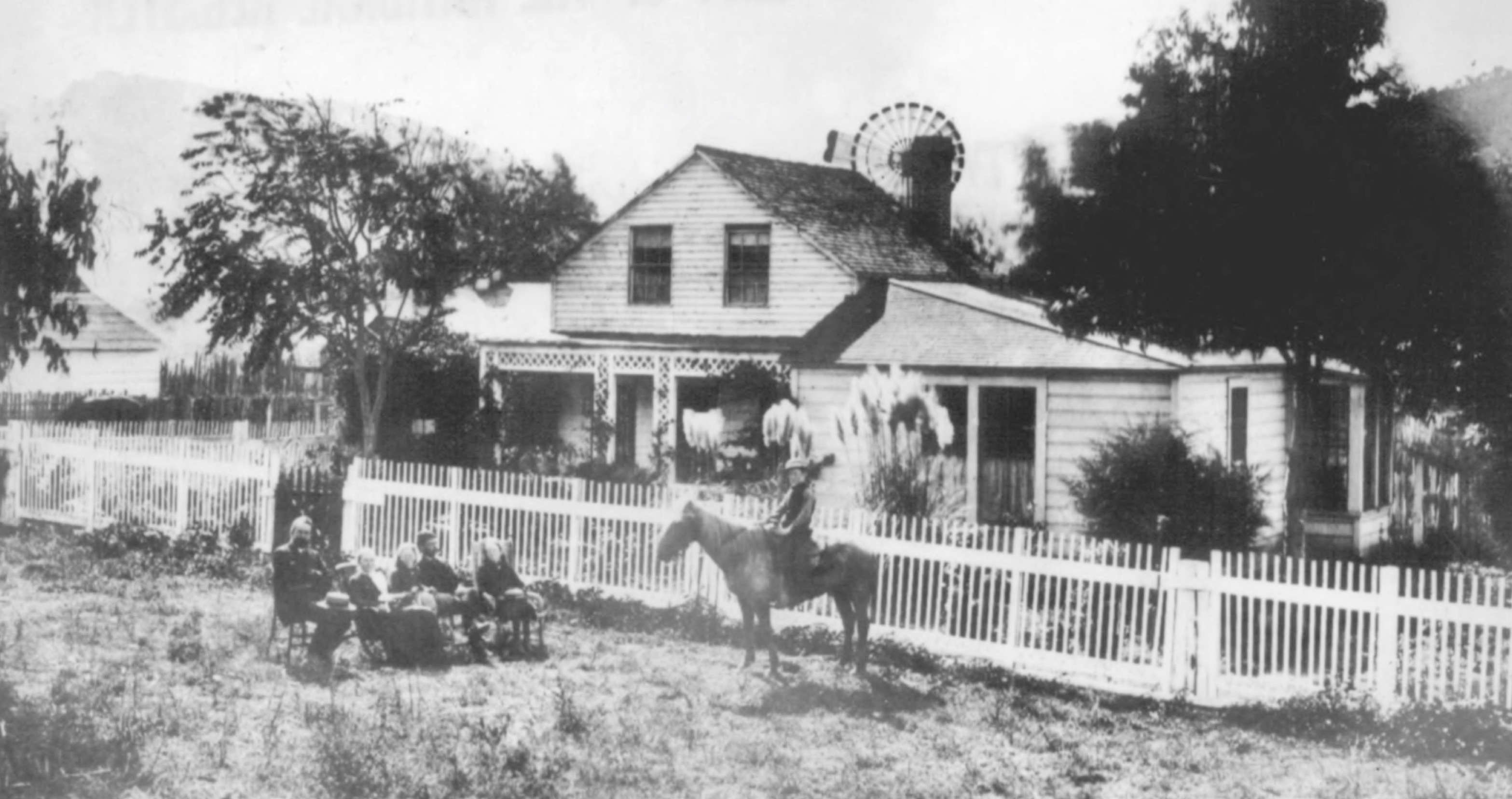
Berwick Manor and Orchard.

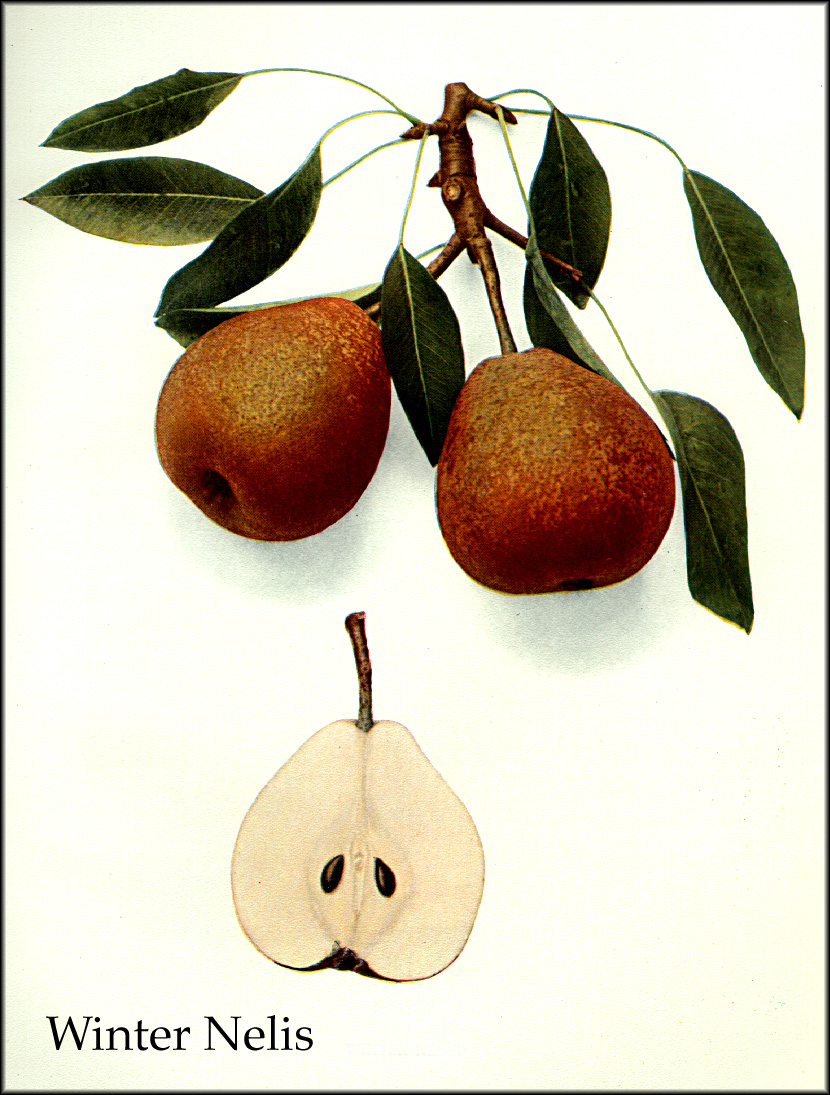
Winter Nelis pear.

Berwick sponsored the growing delivery business, United Parcel Service, and became the first president of the Postal Post League of California, fighting for parcel post and Postal Svings-Banks. He was a scholar who taught at the Carmelo School, which was Carmel Valley's first schoolhouse. He was a writer, speaker and advocate of local sanitation and world peace.

== Death ==
Berwick of Pacific Grove, died on January 28, 1934, in Monterey, California. He was 91 years old.

== See also ==
- Berwick Manor and Orchard
