= Berwick Manor and Orchard =

Historic place in Carmel Valley, California, USA

- U.S. National Register of Historic Places
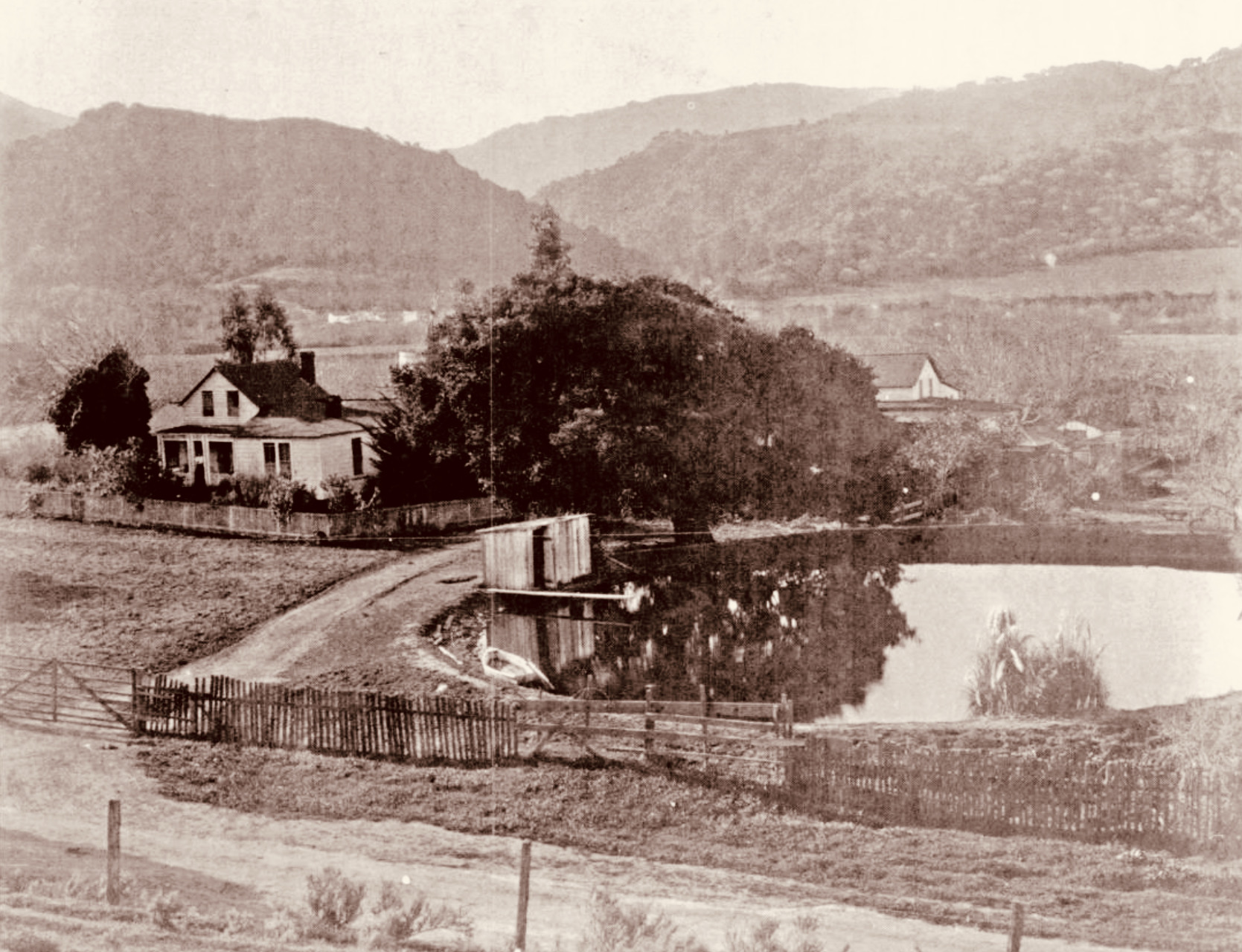
- Berwick Manor and Orchard in Carmel Valley.

- Location within California Location within the United States
- Location: NW Carmel Valley Road, Carmel Valley, California
- Coordinates: 36°31′24.37″N 121°48′44.08″W
- Area: 120 acres (49 ha)
- NRHP reference No.: 77000309
- Added to NRHP: November 17, 1977

Berwick Manor and Orchard, is located on Boronda Road off Carmel Valley Road in Carmel Valley, California. The farmstead was acquired in 1869 by Edward Berwick, a prolific writer and educator as well as a scientific farmer. The manor and orchard was listed on the National Register of Historic Places on November 17, 1977.

== History ==
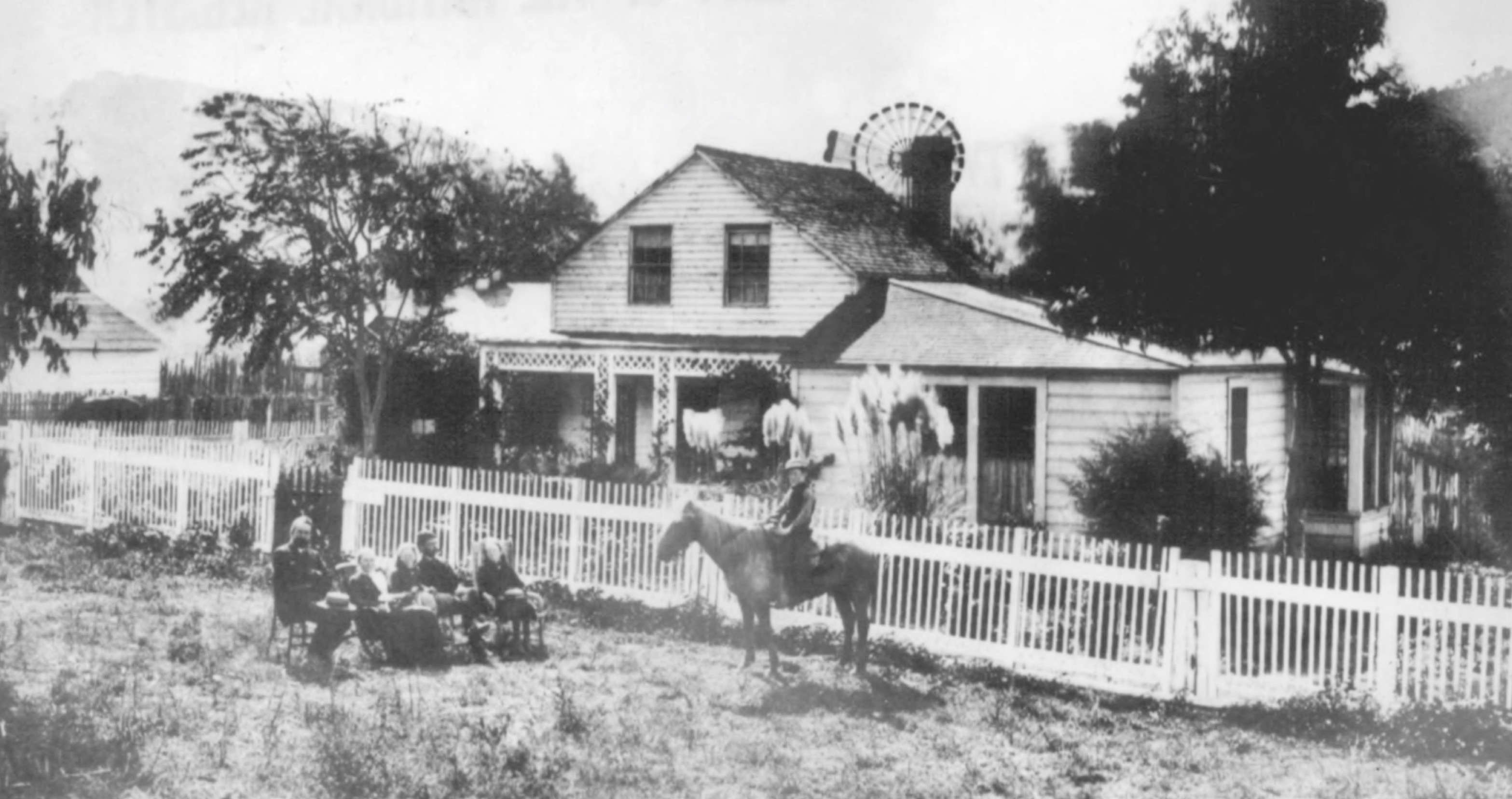
Berwick Manor and Orchard.

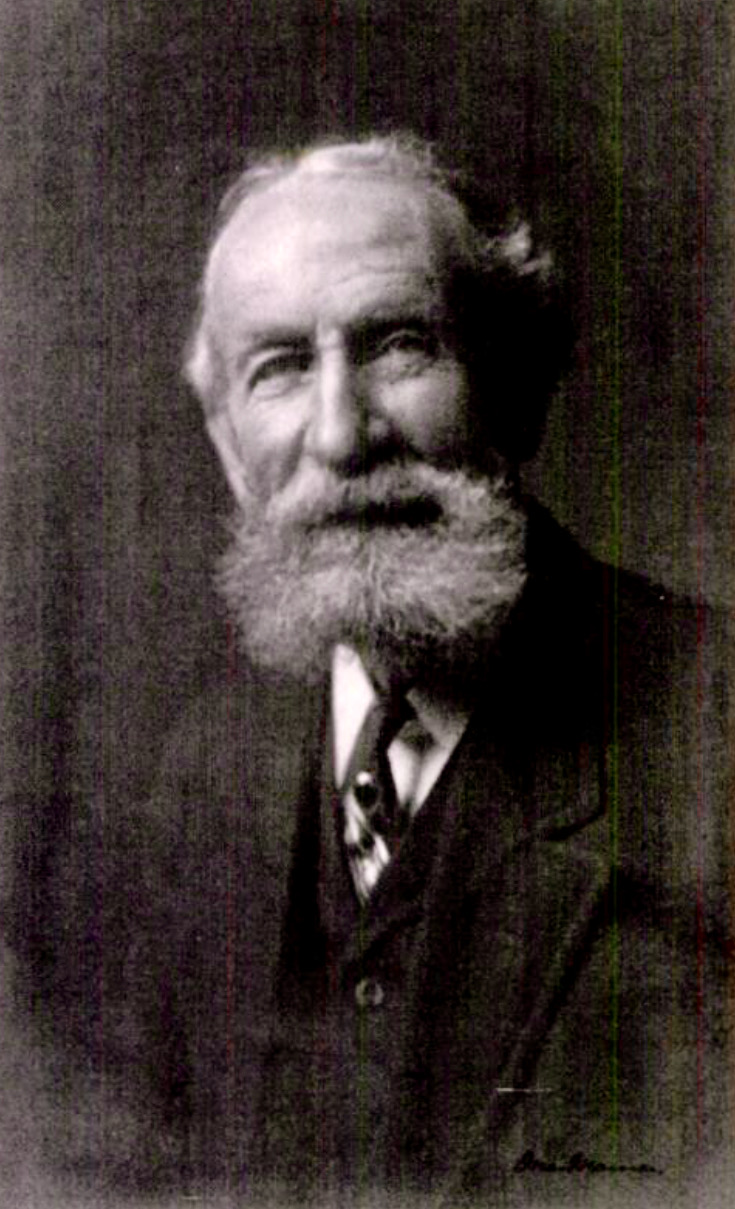
Edward Berwick (1843-1934).

The farm has been in continual ownership and operation by the Berwick family since 1869 and is the only intact farmstead of this period left in Carmel Valley.

The property has been held by four families, since its initial parceling in the Mexican land grant in present-day Monterey County, California, given on January 27, 1840, to Antonio Romero by Governor Juan Alvarado. It was used during the Great Depression by the federal government to teach local ranchers more scientific farming methods.

Edward Berwick died on January 28, 1934, in Monterey, California. He was 91 years old. After his death, the Berwick Orchards were put for rent. An 89.82 acre parcel of land at the Berwick Manor and Orchard was sold in 1961 and later subdivided into what is known today as the Berwick Manor Subdivision.

== See also ==
- National Register of Historic Places listings in Monterey County, California
