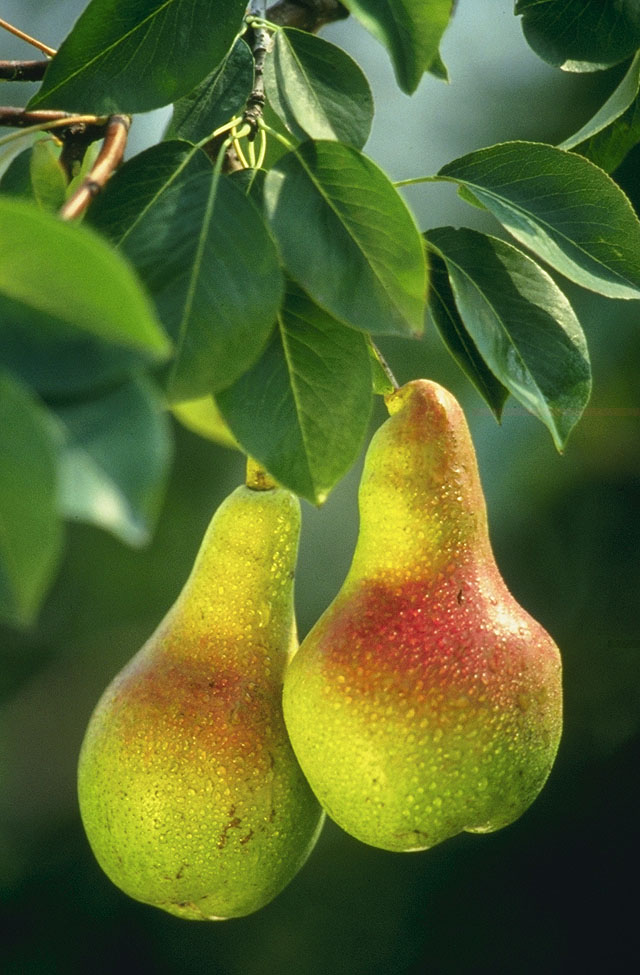
- Common pear branch with fruit

Conservation status
- Least Concern (IUCN 3.1)

Scientific classification
- Kingdom: Plantae
- Clade: Tracheophytes
- Clade: Angiosperms
- Clade: Eudicots
- Clade: Rosids
- Order: Rosales
- Family: Rosaceae
- Genus: Pyrus
- Species: P. communis

Binomial name
- Pyrus communis L.

Synonyms
- List: Crataegus excelsa Salisb.; Malus communis (L.) Poir.; Pyrenia pyrus Clairv.; Pyrus achras Gaertn.; Pyrus ambrosiaca Poit. & Turpin; Pyrus amphigenea Domin ex Dostalek; Pyrus anglica Druce; Pyrus anglica Poit. & Turpin; Pyrus balansae Decne.; Pyrus caucasica Fed.; Pyrus caucasica var. schuntukensis Tuz; Pyrus communis subsp. australeuropaea Tuz; Pyrus communis subsp. medioasiatica Tuz; Pyrus communis subsp. orientaleuropaea Tuz; Pyrus communis subsp. transcaucasica Tuz; Pyrus communis var. pompejana L.; Pyrus communis var. pyraster L.; Pyrus communis var. sativa DC.; Pyrus communis var. sylvestris DC.; Pyrus communis var. volema L.; Pyrus domestica (Borkh.) Medik.; Pyrus karpatiana Terpó; Pyrus magyarica Terpó; Pyrus moschata Poit. & Turpin; Pyrus papulata Poit. & Turpin; Pyrus pyraster (L.) Burgsd.; Pyrus pyraster subsp. achras (Gaertn.) Stohr; Pyrus pyraster var. achras (Gaertn.) Cinovskis; Pyrus pyraster var. relicta Dostálek; Pyrus pyraster var. rossica (A.D.Danilov) Tuz; Pyrus pyraster var. tomentosa (W.D.J.Koch) Dostálek; Pyrus rossica A.D.Danilov; Pyrus salviati Poit. & Turpin; Sorbus pyrus Crantz

= Pyrus communis =

Species of pear tree

Pyrus communis, the common pear, is a species of pear native to central and eastern Europe, and western Asia.

It is one of the most important fruits of temperate regions, being the species from which most orchard pear cultivars grown in Europe, North America, and Australia have been developed. Two other species of pear, the Japanese pear (Pyrus pyrifolia) and the hybrid Chinese white or duck pear (Pyrus × bretschneideri, Chinese: 白梨; pinyin: báilí) are more widely grown in East Asia.

== Subspecies ==
The following subspecies are currently accepted:

- Pyrus communis subsp. caucasica (Fed.) Browicz – Turkey, Caucasus
- Pyrus communis subsp. communis – Entire range except Caucasus

== Origin ==
The cultivated common pear (P. communis subsp. communis) is thought to be descended from two subspecies of wild pears, categorized as P. communis subsp. pyraster (syn. P. pyraster) and P. communis subsp. caucasica (syn. P. caucasica), which are interfertile with domesticated pears. Archeological evidence shows these pears "were collected from the wild long before their introduction into cultivation", according to Zohary and Hopf. Although they point to finds of pears in sites in Neolithic and Bronze Age European sites, "reliable information on pear cultivation first appears in the works of the Greek and the Roman writers." Theophrastus, Cato the Elder, and Pliny the Elder all present information about the cultivation and grafting of pears.

== Cultivation ==
Common pear trees are not quite as hardy as apples, but nearly so. However, they do require some winter chilling to produce fruit. A number of Lepidoptera caterpillars feed on pear tree leaves.

For best and most consistent quality, common pears are picked when the fruit matures, but before they are ripe. Fruit allowed to ripen on the tree often drops before it can be picked, and in any event will be hard to pick without bruising. Pears store (and ship) well in their mature but unripe state if kept cold, and can be ripened later, a process called bletting. Some varieties, such as Beurre d'Anjou, ripen only with exposure to cold. Fermented pear juice is called perry.

Relatively few cultivars of European or Asian pears are widely grown worldwide. Only about 20–25 European and 10–20 Asian cultivars represent virtually all the pears of commerce. Almost all European cultivars were chance seedlings or selections originating in western Europe, mostly France. The Asian cultivars all originated in Japan and China. 'Bartlett' (Williams) is the most common pear cultivar in the world, representing about 75% of US pear production.

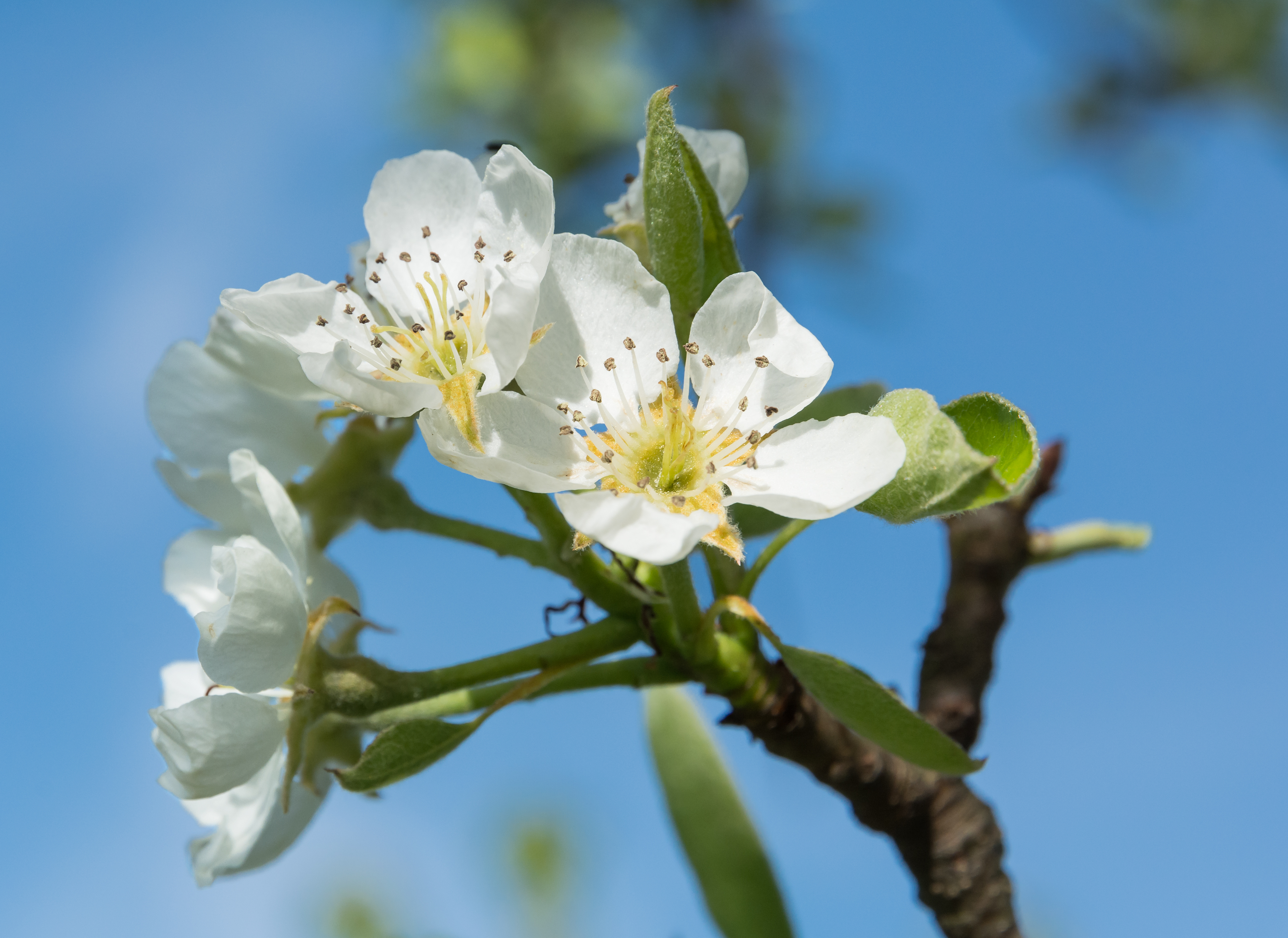
Pear tree in flower

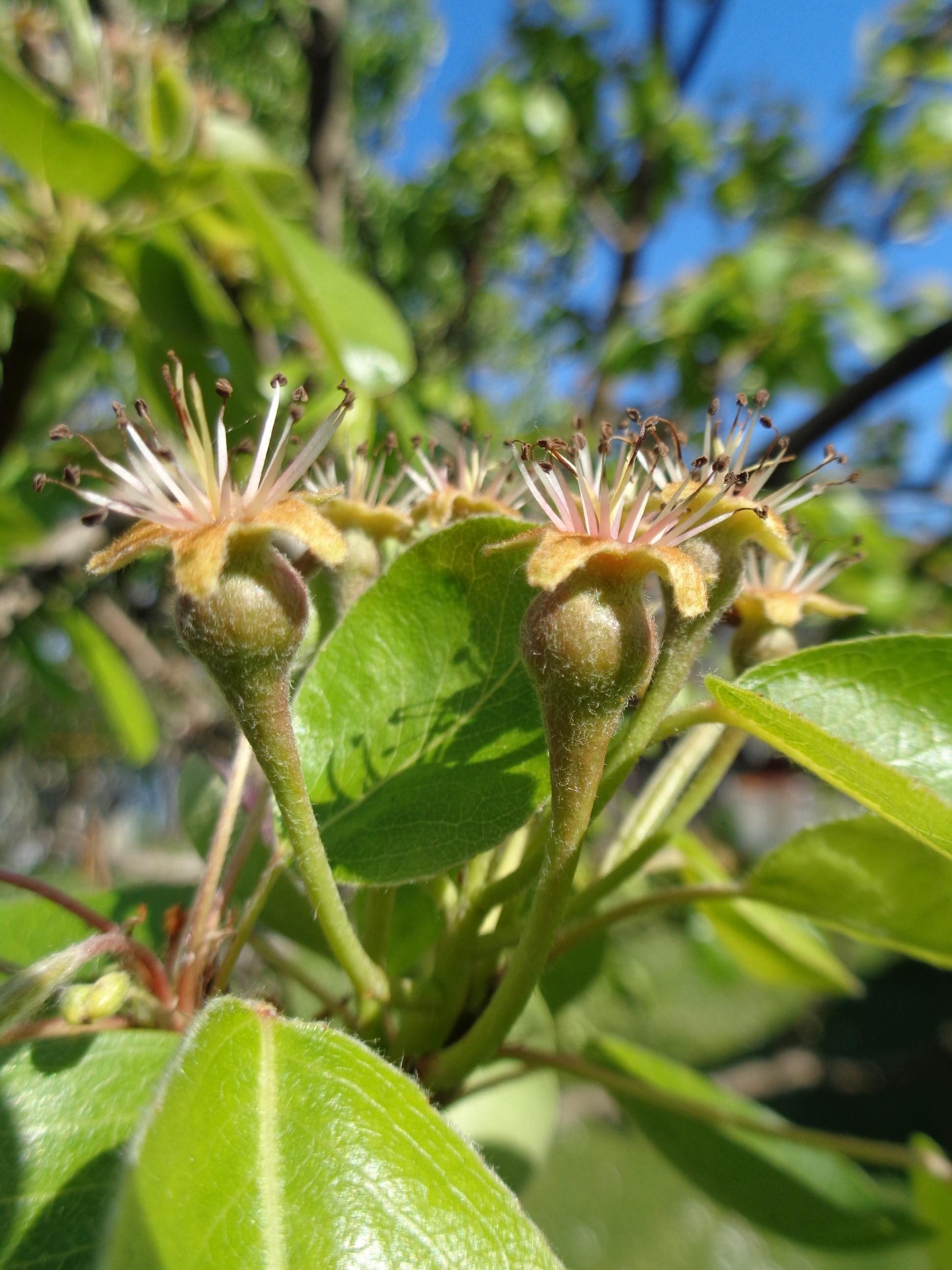
Tiny unripe pears

=== Cultivars ===
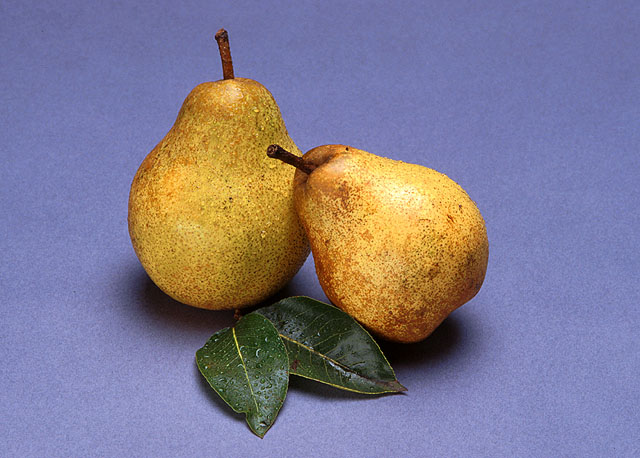
Blake's Pride pear

Packham's Triumph pear, or just Packham's pear

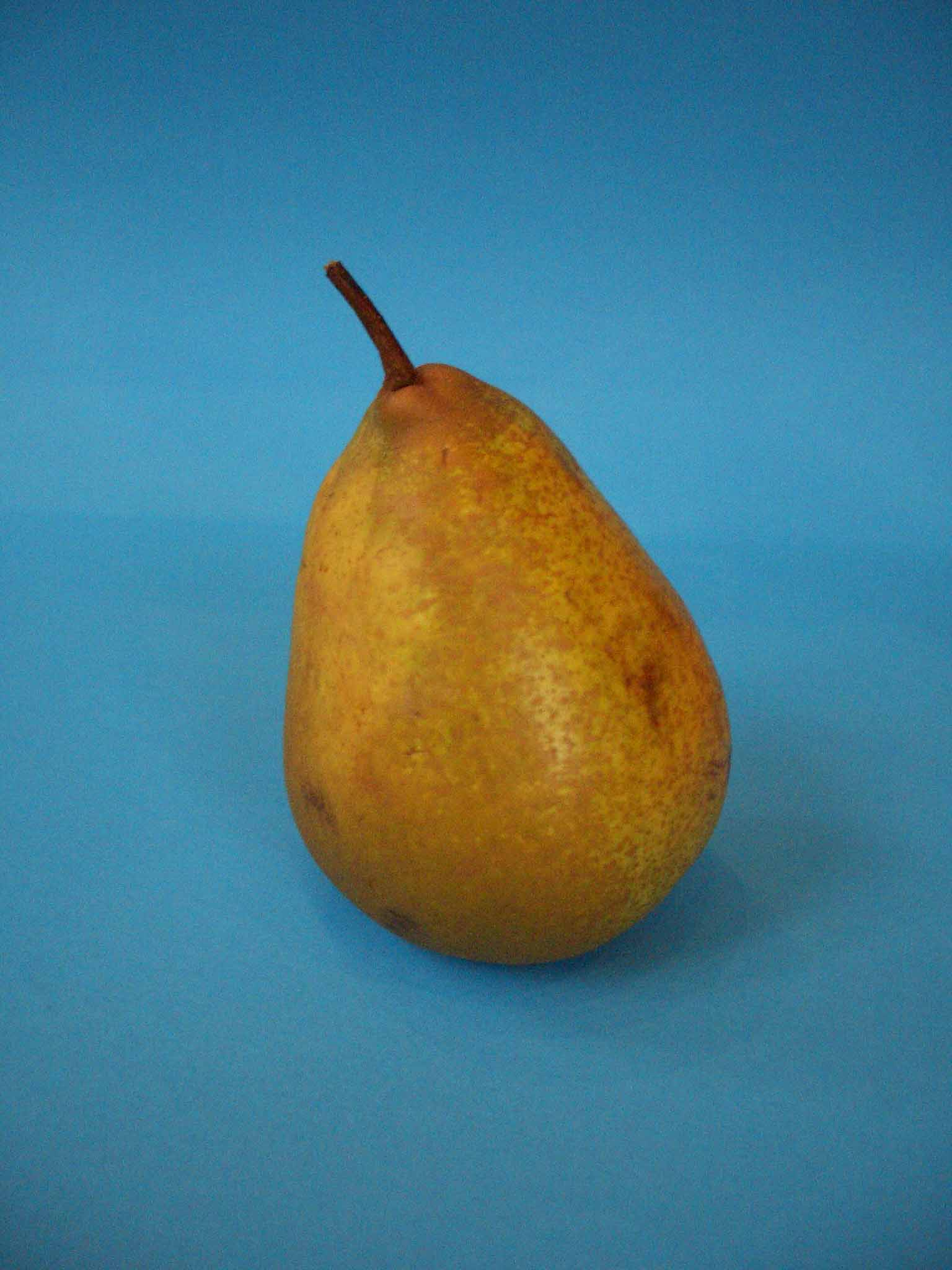
Beurré Clairgeau, or Clairgeau pear, an early 19th-century French variety

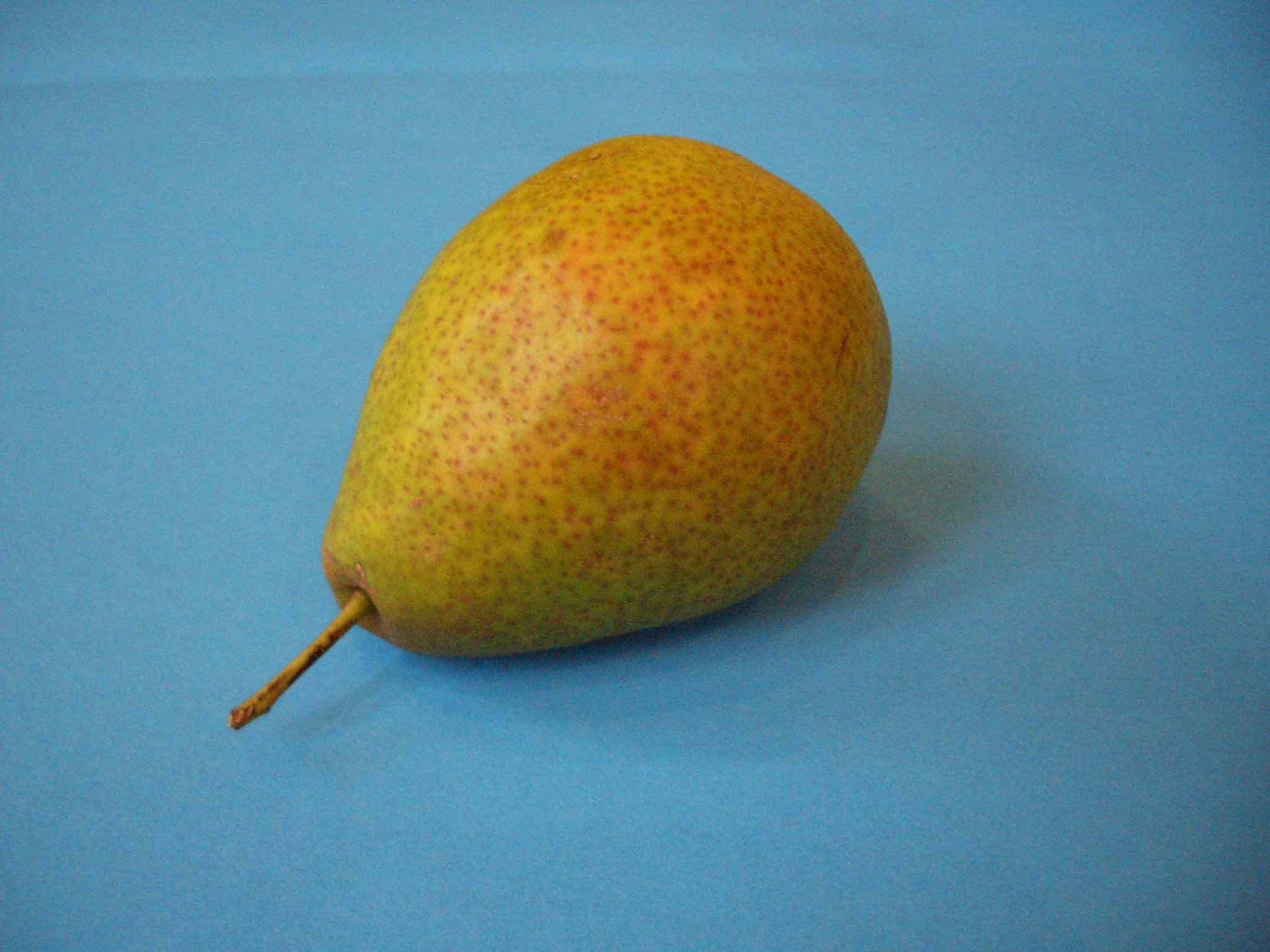
Louise Bonne of Jersey pear, a late 18th-century French pear

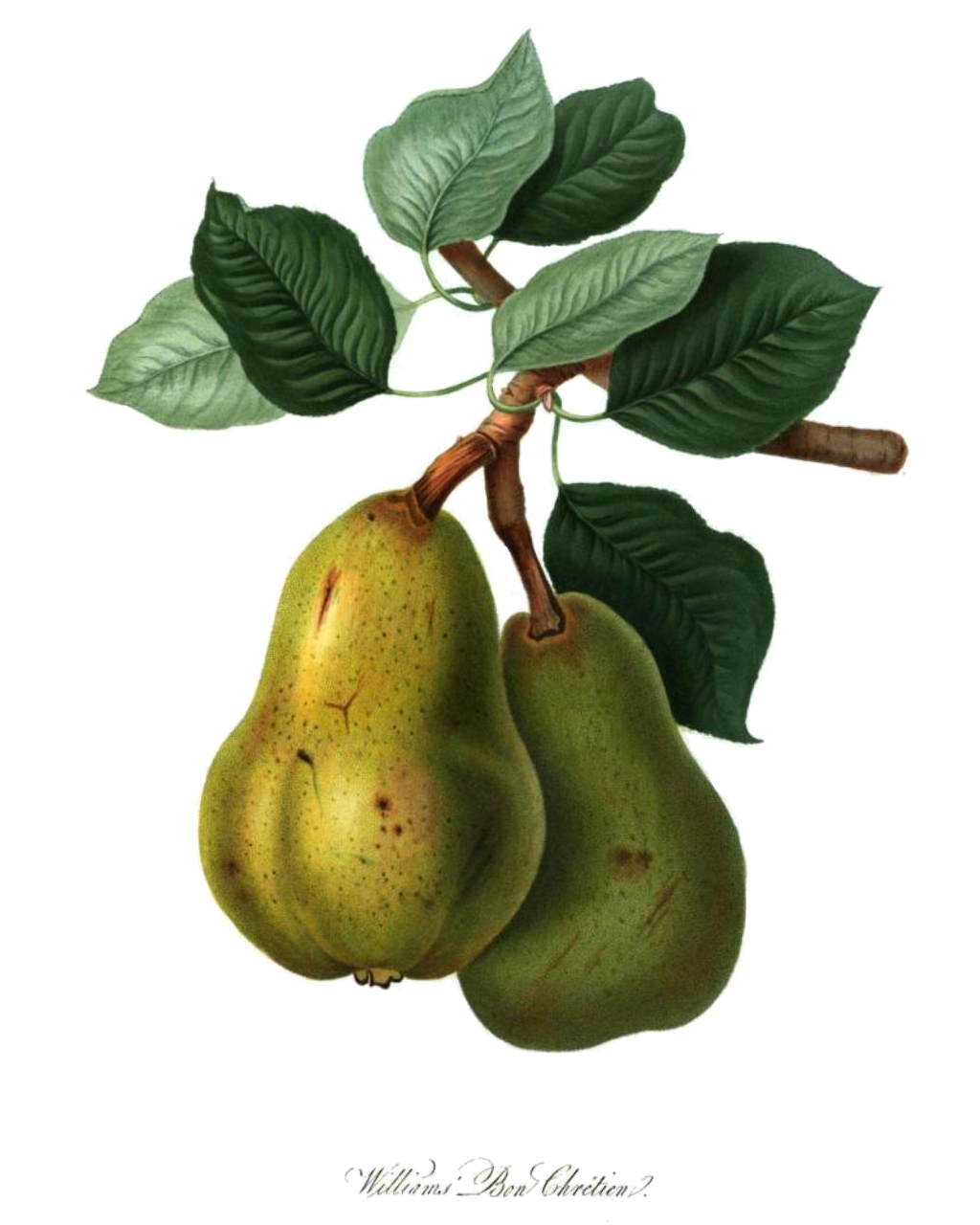
Williams' Bon Chrétien (commonly Williams or Bartlett) pear, 1822 print

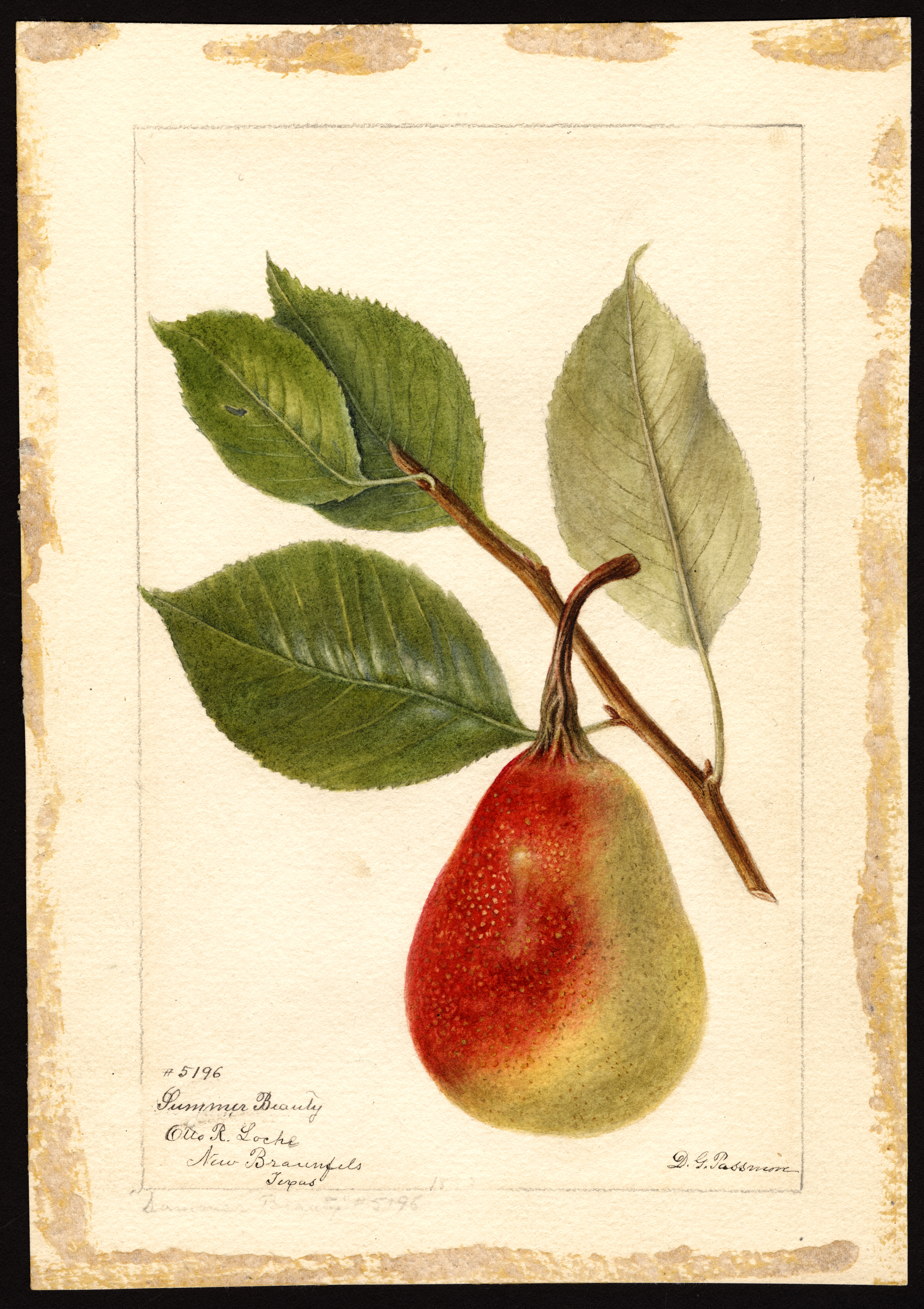
Summer Beauty pear - watercolor 1893

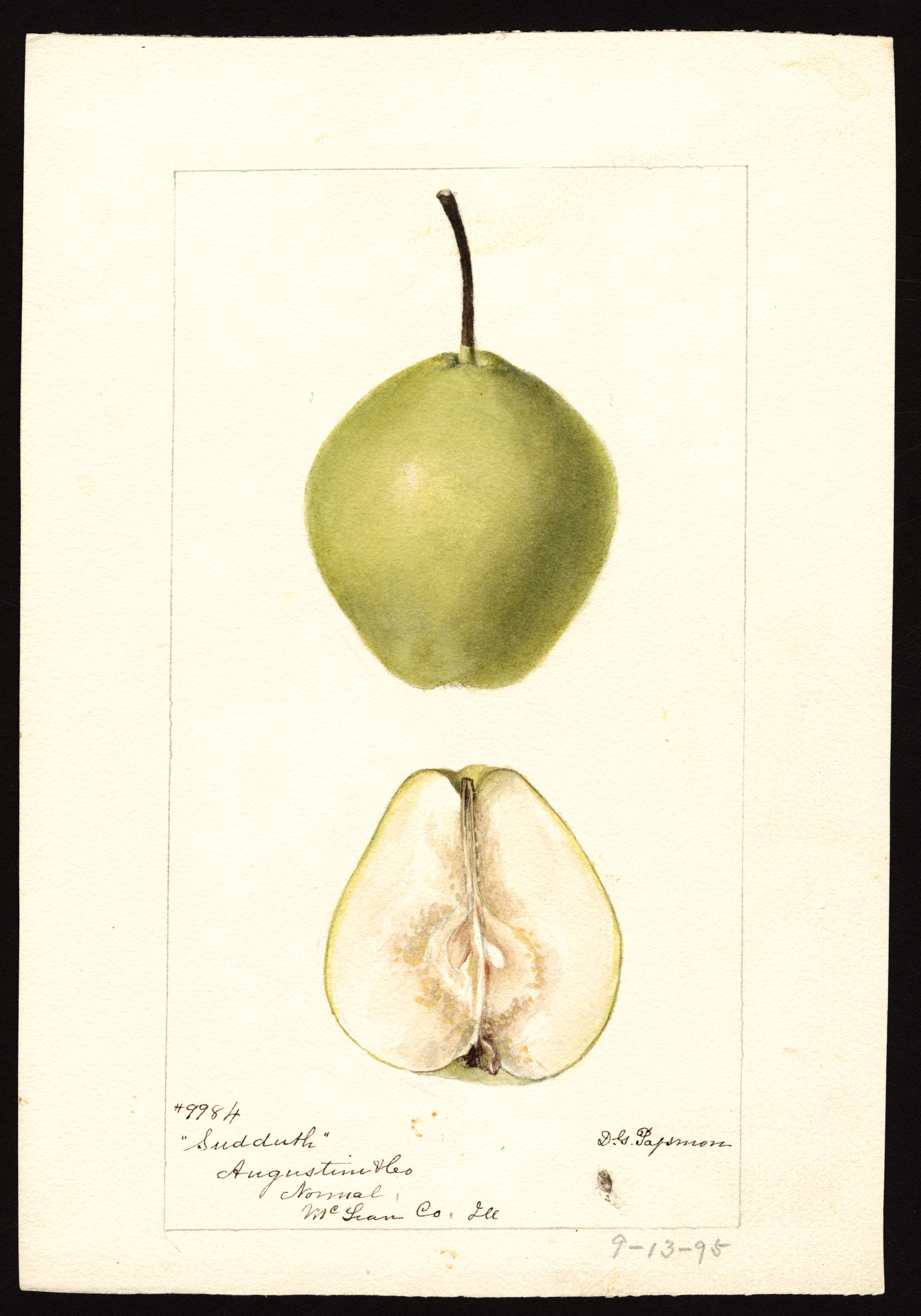
Sudduth pear - watercolor 1895

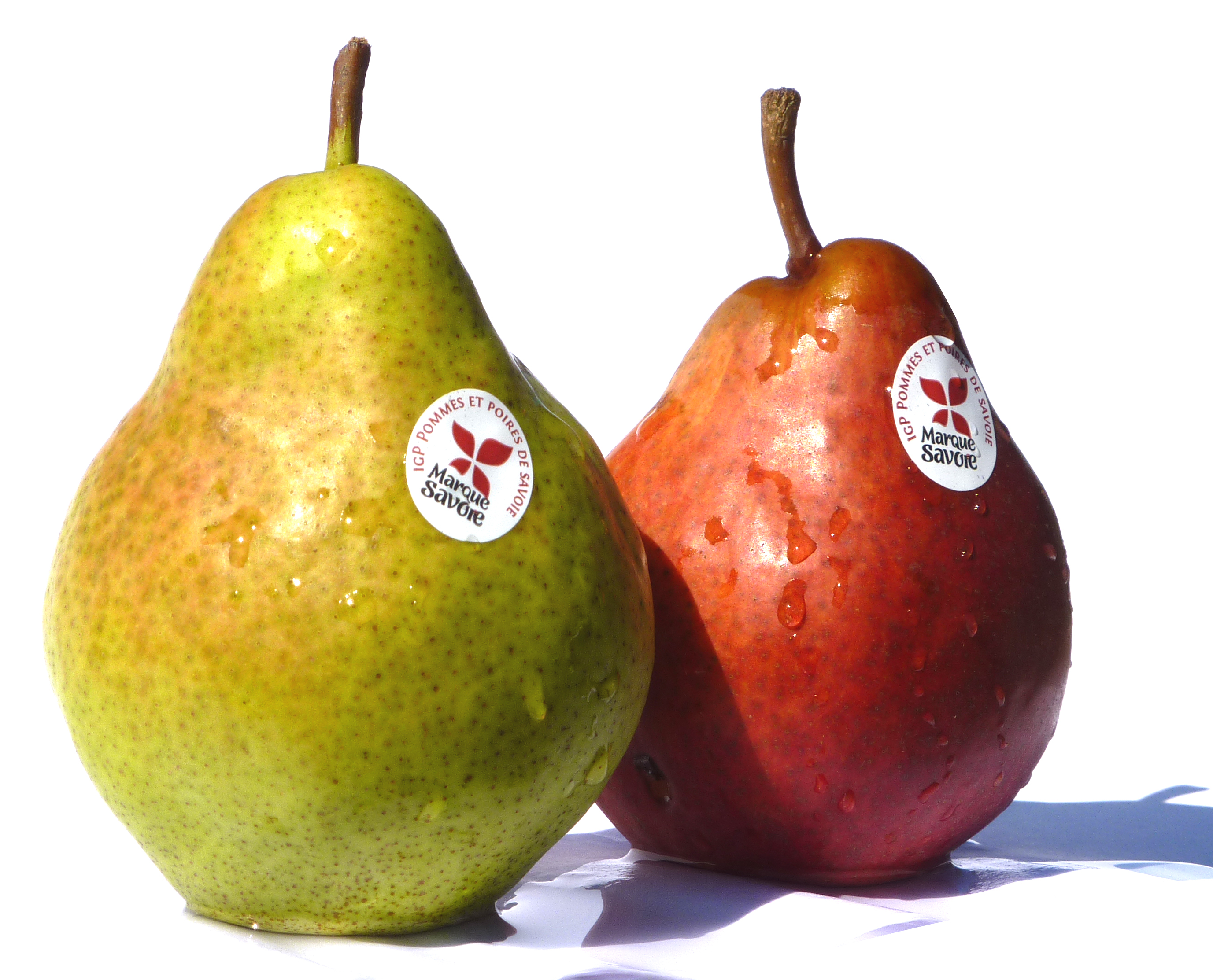
Williams pear red and green

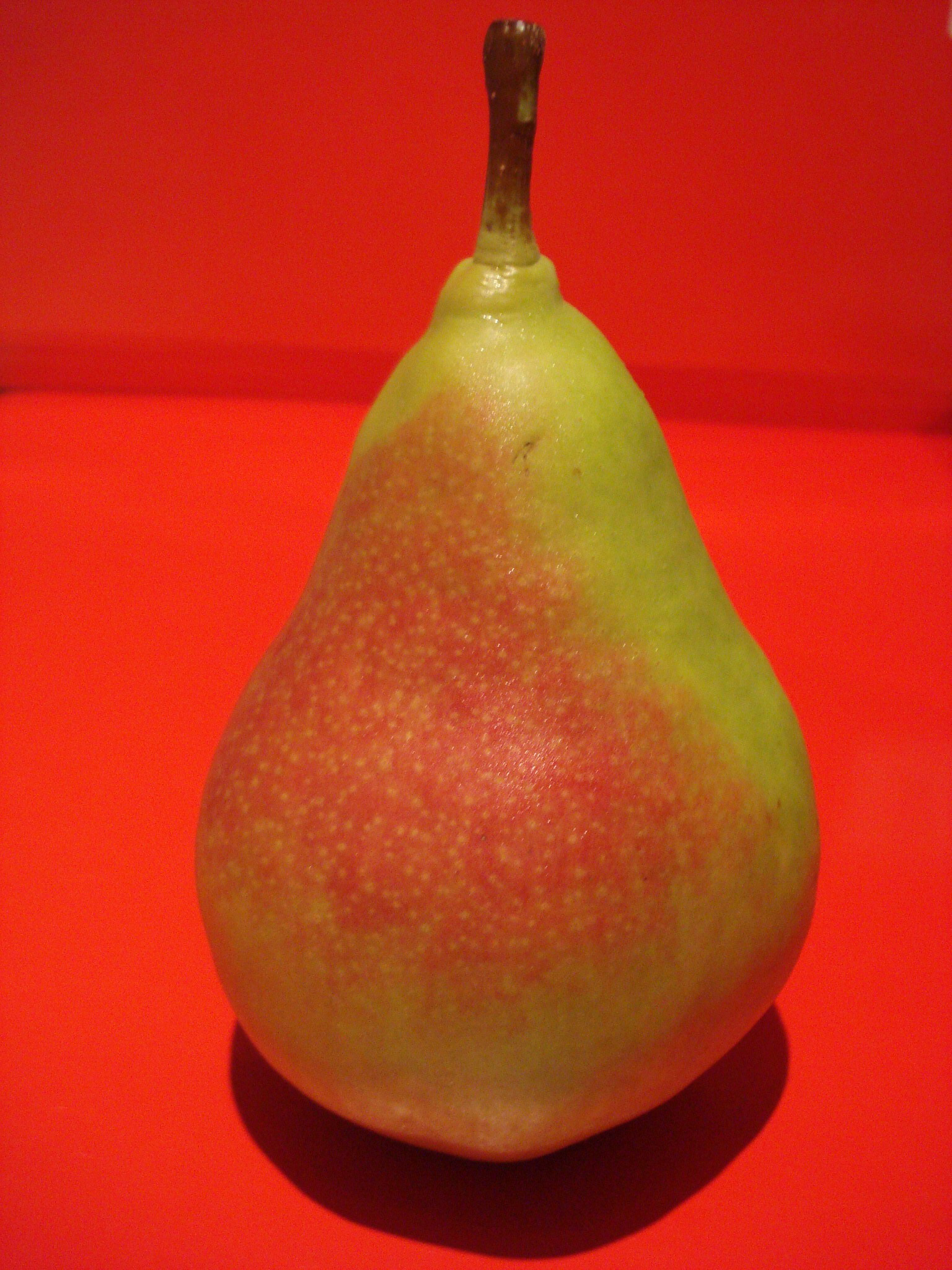
'Butirra Precoce Morettini' variety

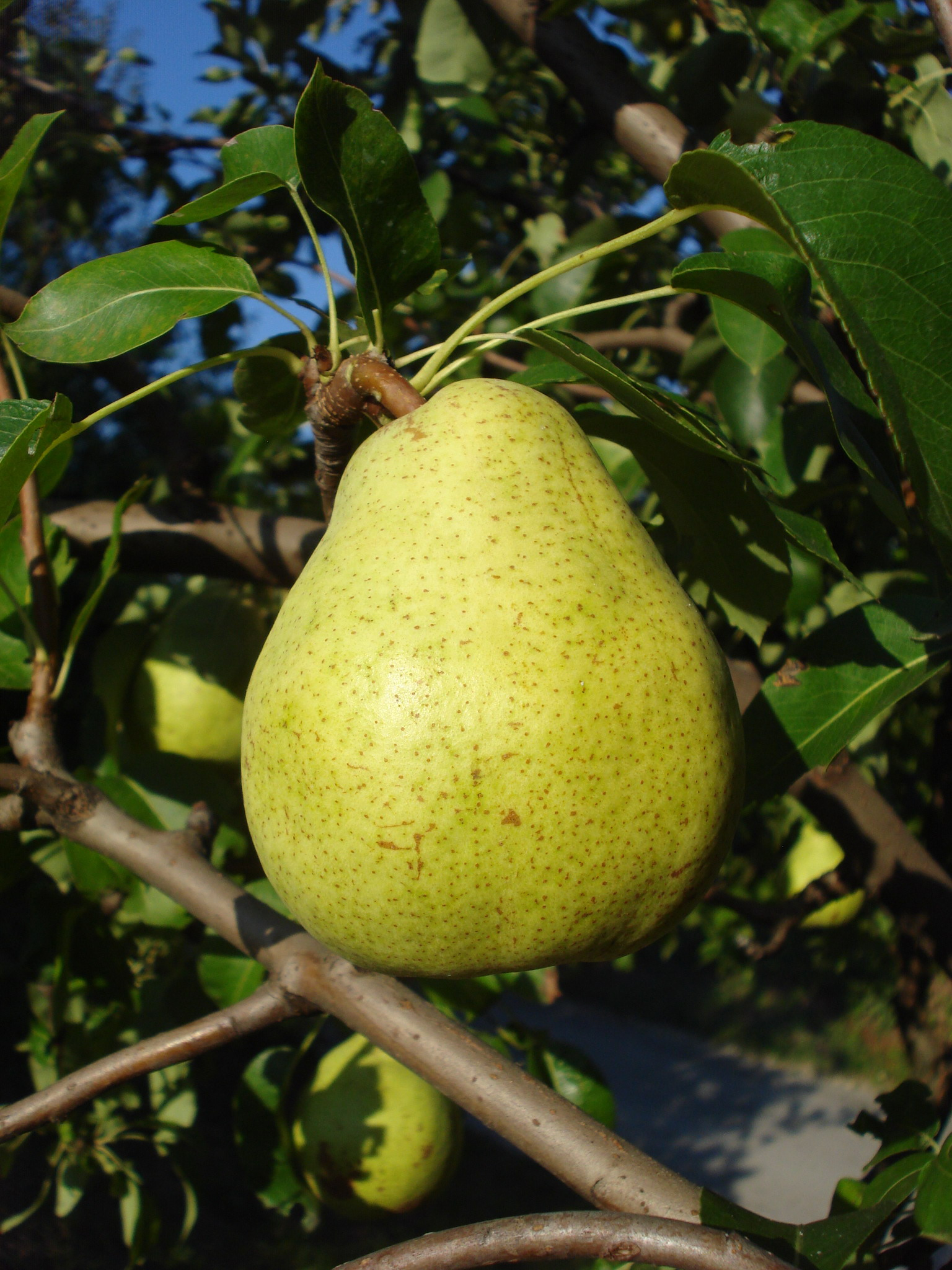
'Doyenné du Comice' variety

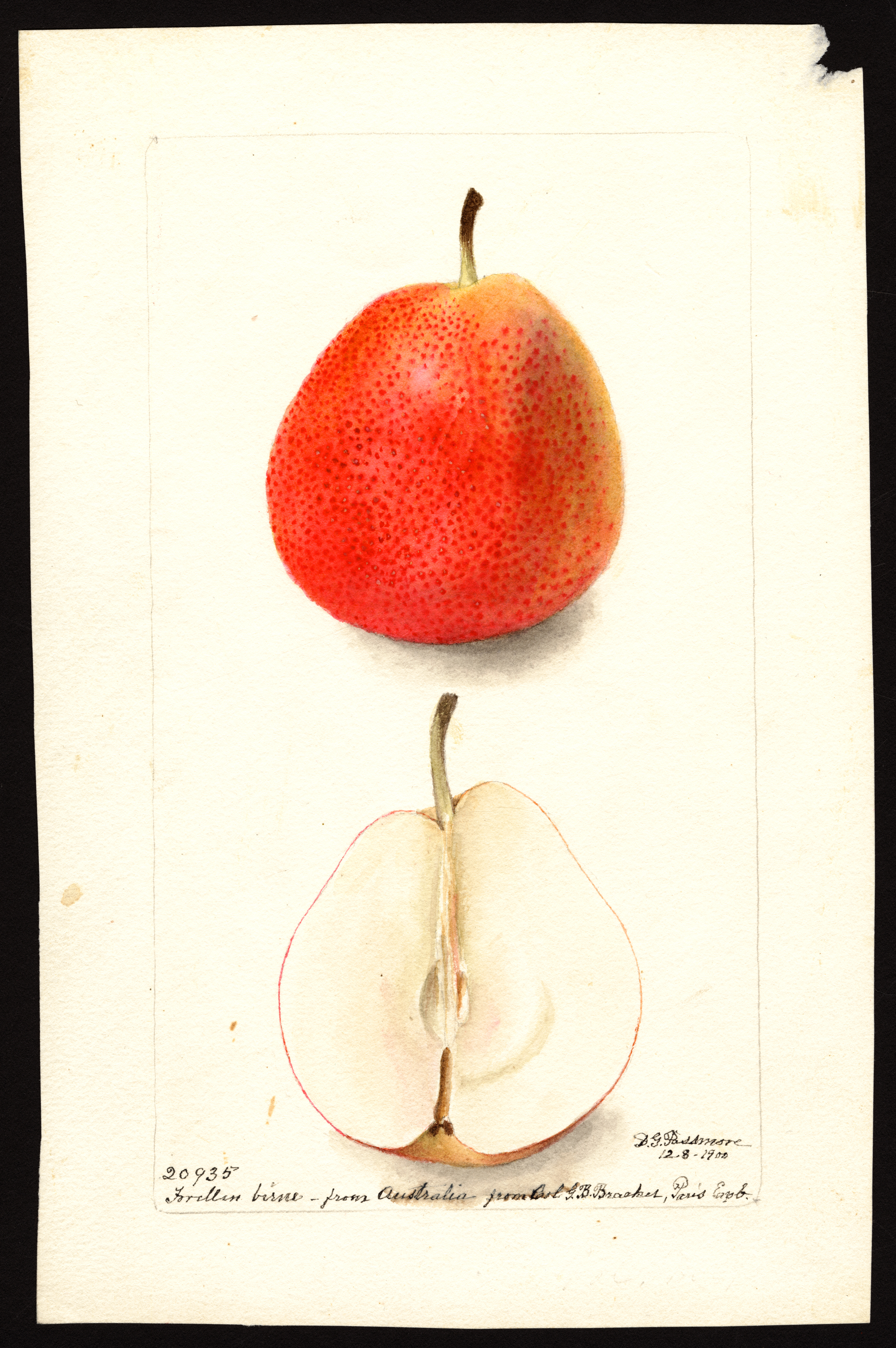
Watercolor of Forelle (Common pear) painted in 1900 by Deborah Griscom Passmore (USDA)

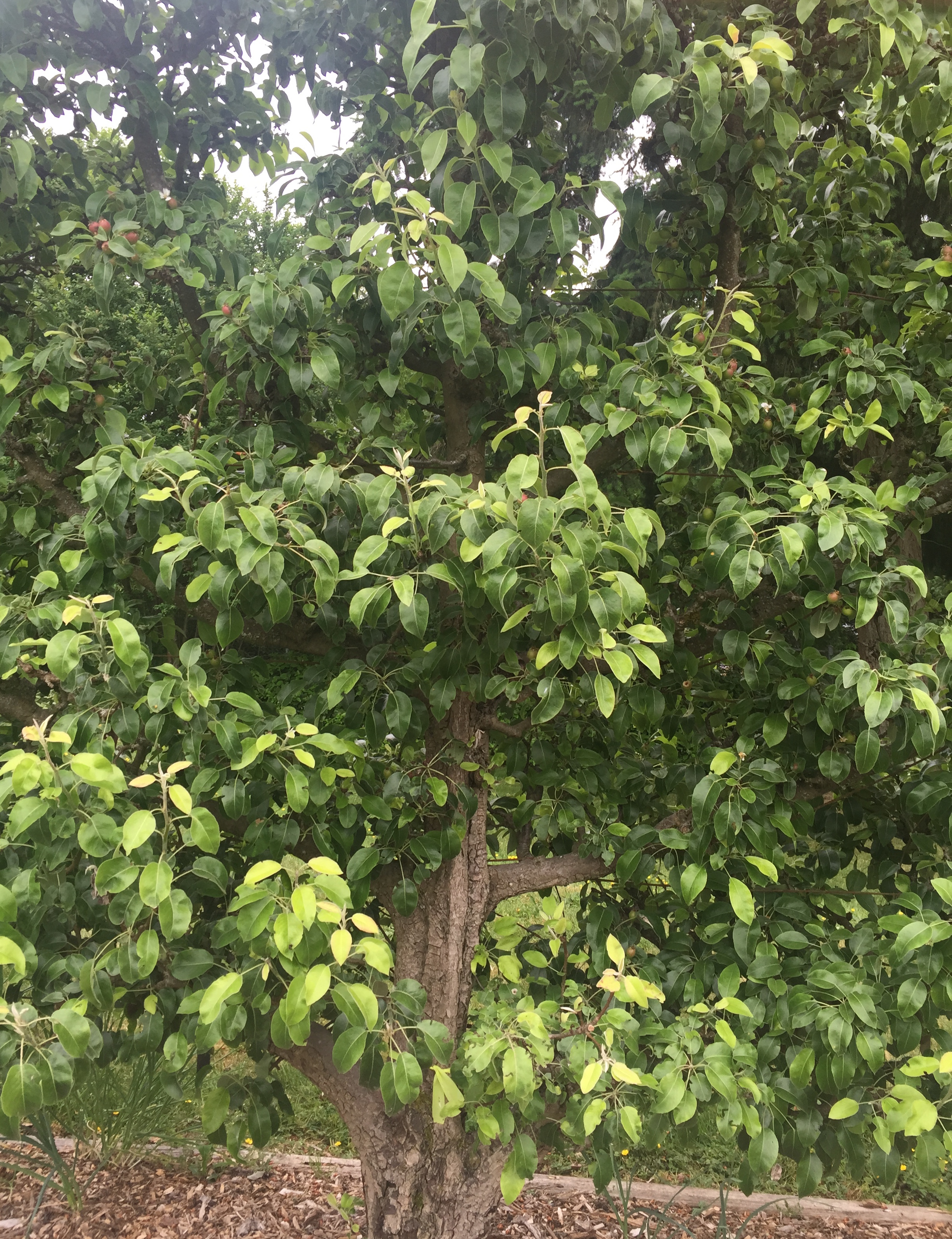
Pyrus Communis in the UBC Botanical Garden

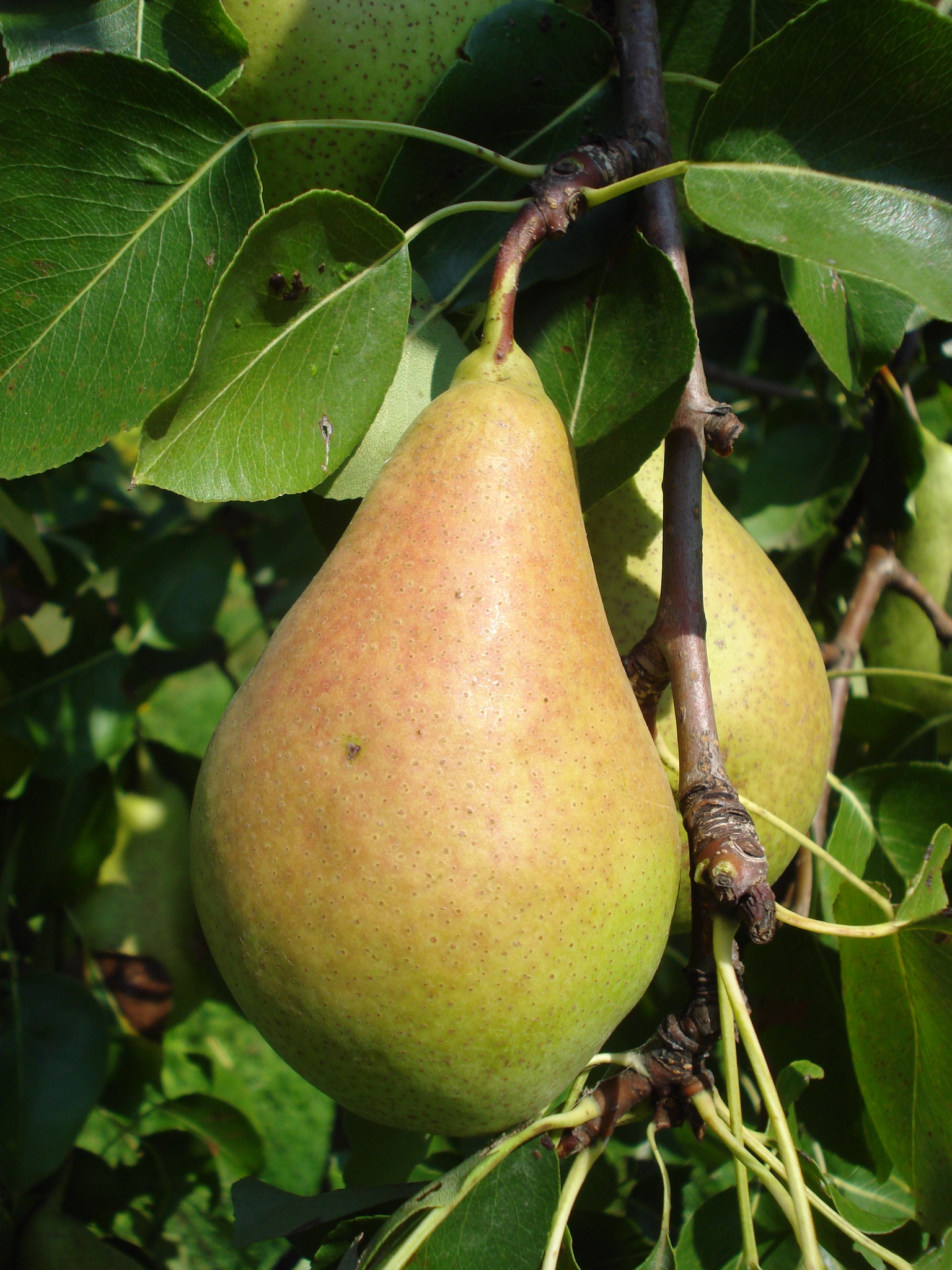
'Vicar of Winkfield' variety

Windsor pear - watercolour 1924

== Uses ==
Pears are eaten fresh or cooked as a dessert, and may be served in pies. They are sometimes used to accompany meat. Pears are fermented to make perry; this can be distilled to make a pear brandy.

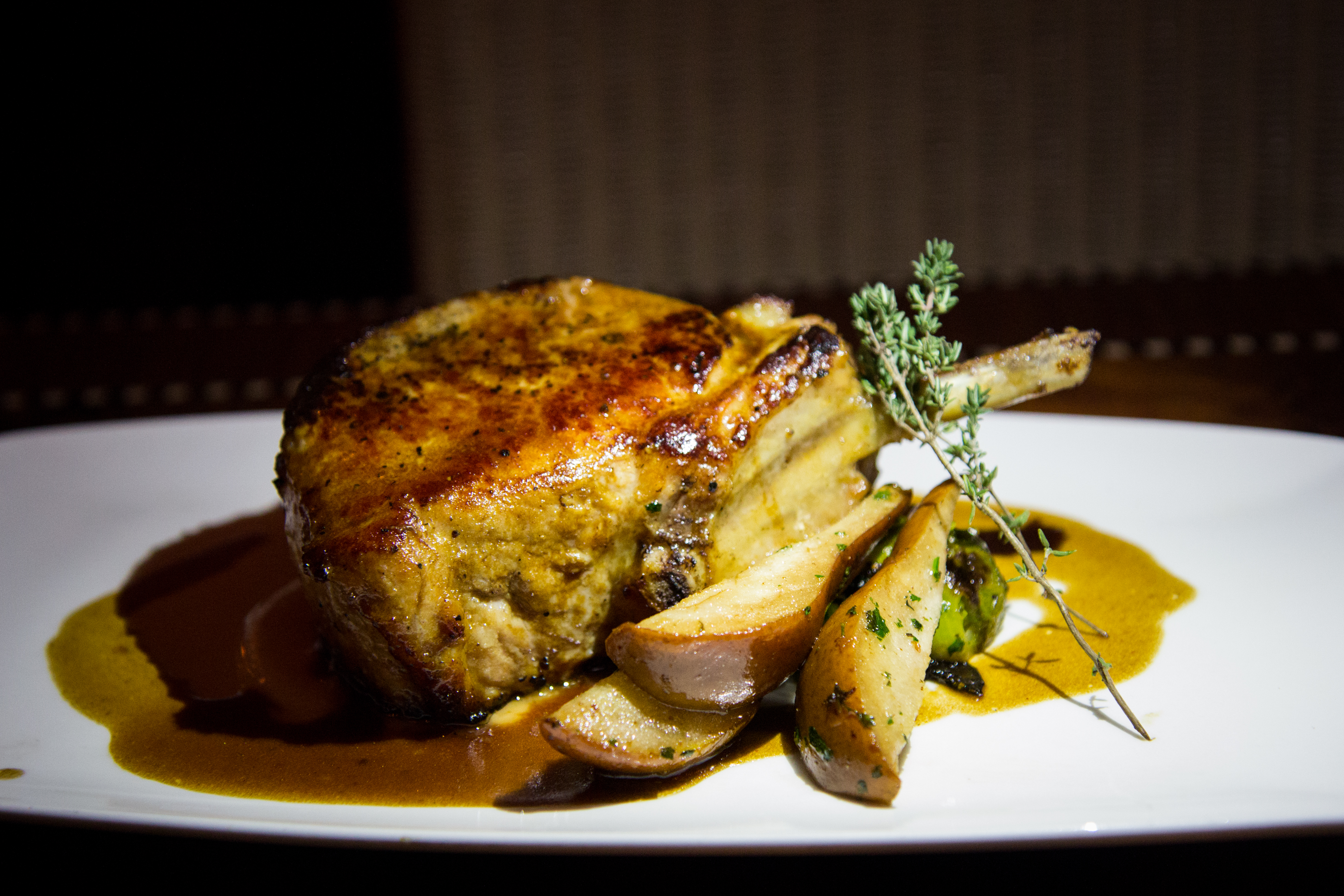
Pork chop with roasted pears

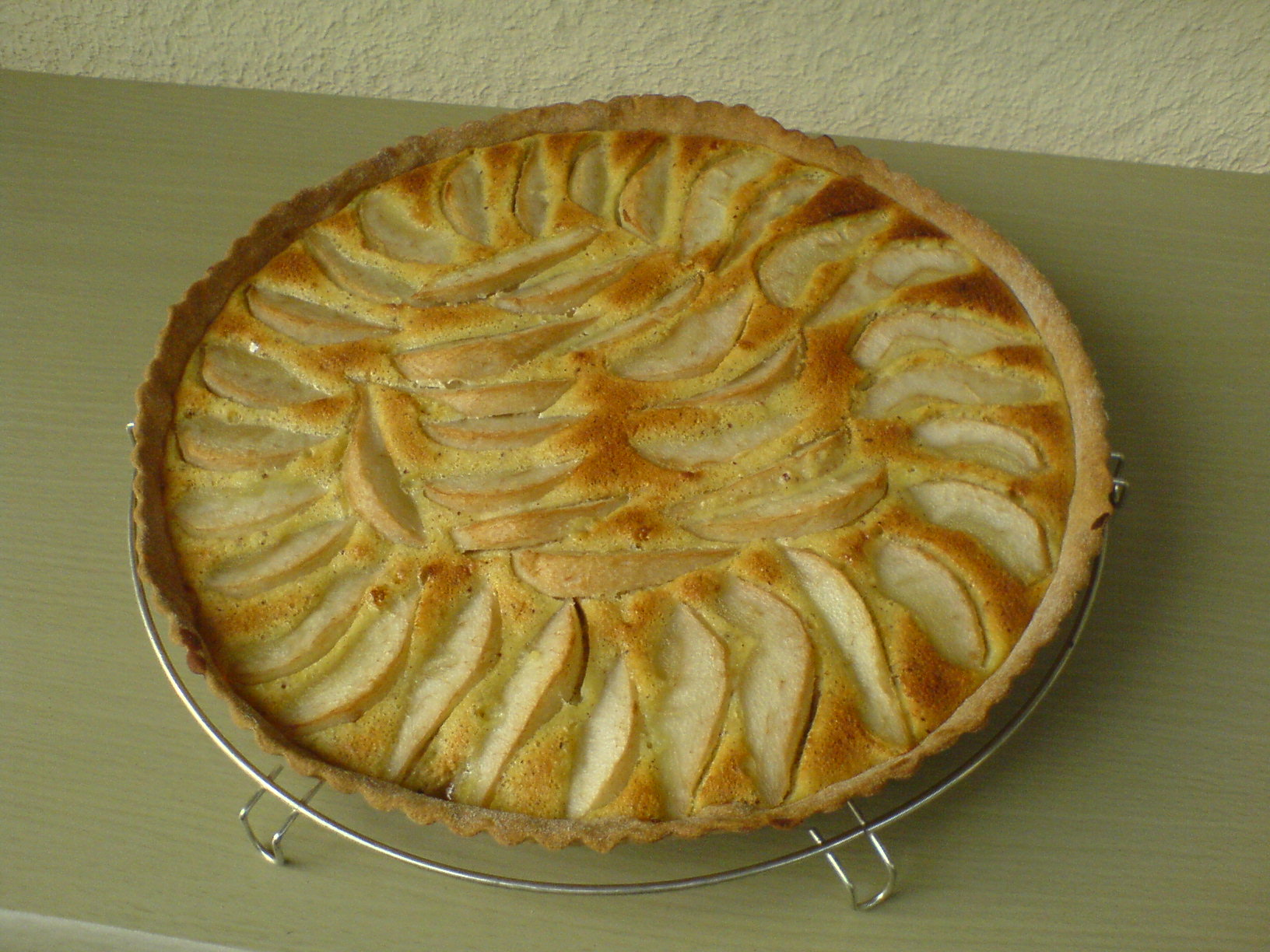
A pear pie

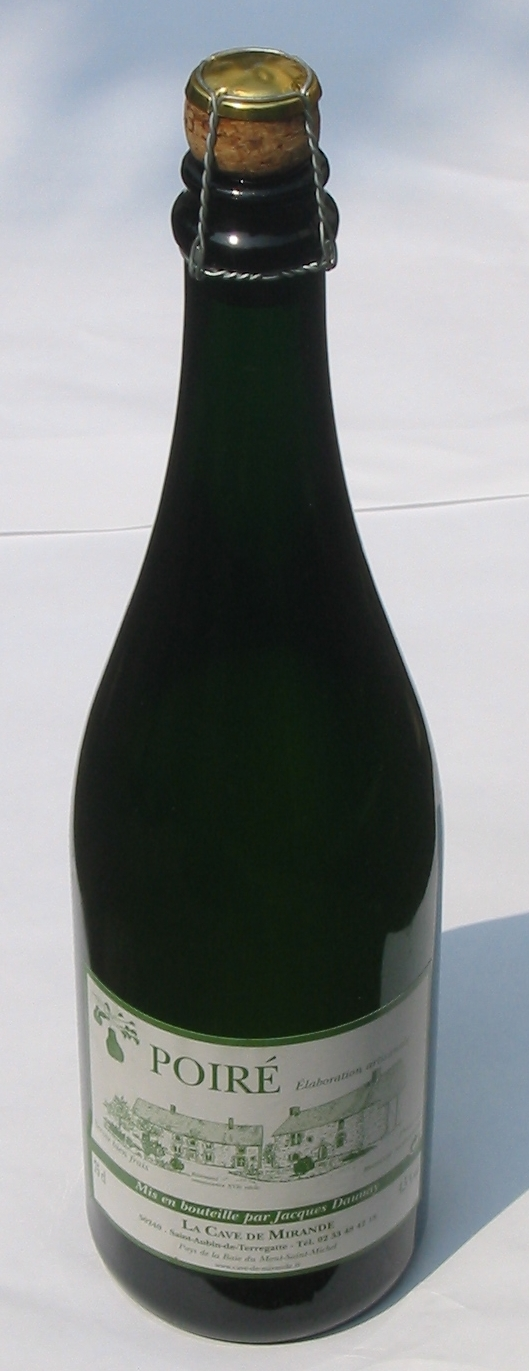
A French perry from Normandy

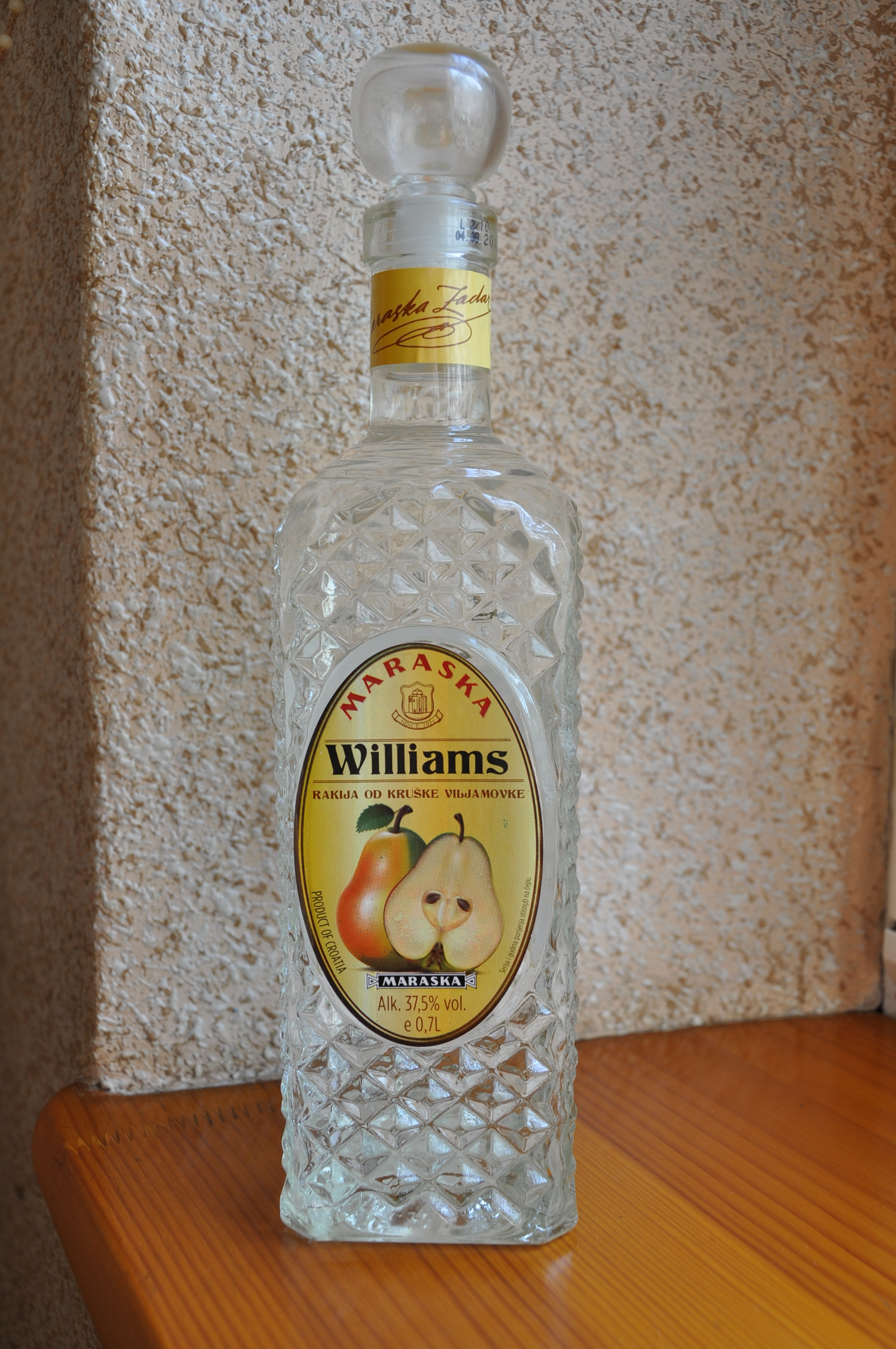
Williams pear brandy
