= Holman Ranch =

Winery in California

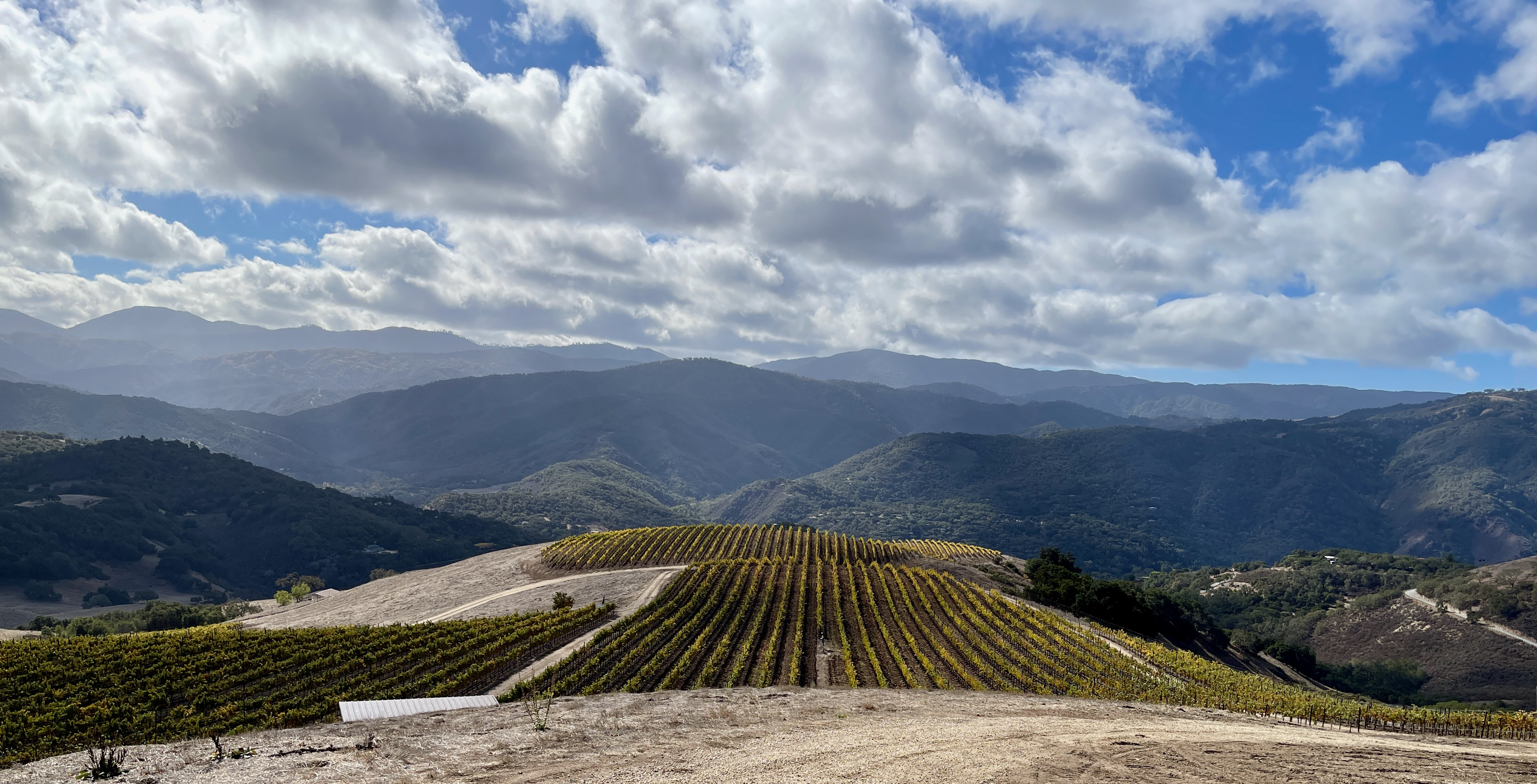
- Holman Ranch Vineyard
- Location: 60 Holman Road, Carmel Valley Village, California, United States
- Coordinates: 36°28′49″N 121°43′15″W
- Wine region: Monterey County, California
- Appellation: Carmel Valley AVA
- Founded: 1928
- Key people: Tom & Susan Lowder (proprietors); Greg Vita and Chris Vita (winemakers); Kirstie Dyer (CEO); Rubi Ramirez (ranch manager)
- Area cultivated: 18 acres (7.3 ha)
- Varietals: Pinot noir, Chardonnay, Pinot gris
- Other attractions: Vineyard tours, weddings, special events
- Distribution: Wine club
- Tasting: Open to public by appointment
- Website: www.holmanranch.com

Holman Ranch was originally part of the Rancho Los Laureles, a 6,625-acre (26.81 km^{2}) Mexican land grant in present-day Monterey County, California. The ranch passed through many hands until 1928, when San Francisco businessman, Gordon Armsby, purchased 400 acres (160 ha) in Carmel Valley, California, that would become the Holman Ranch. Today, the Holman Ranch continues as a privately owned winery.

== History ==
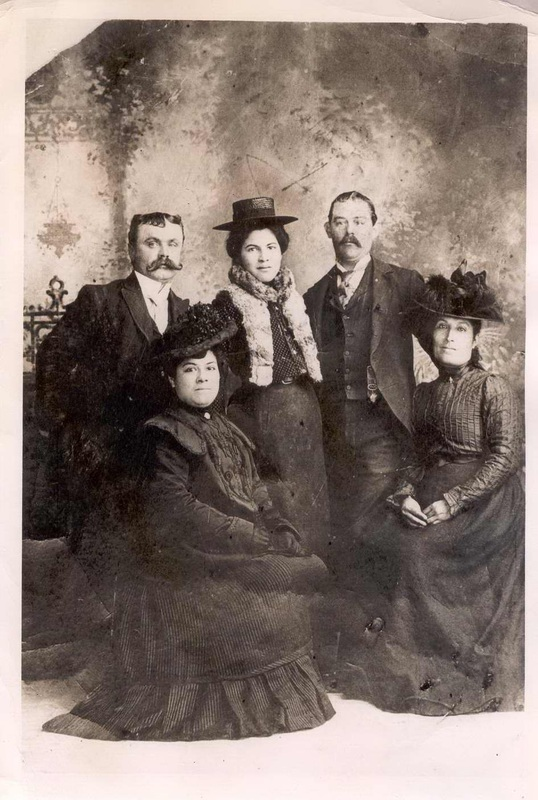
Boronda family of Monterey County

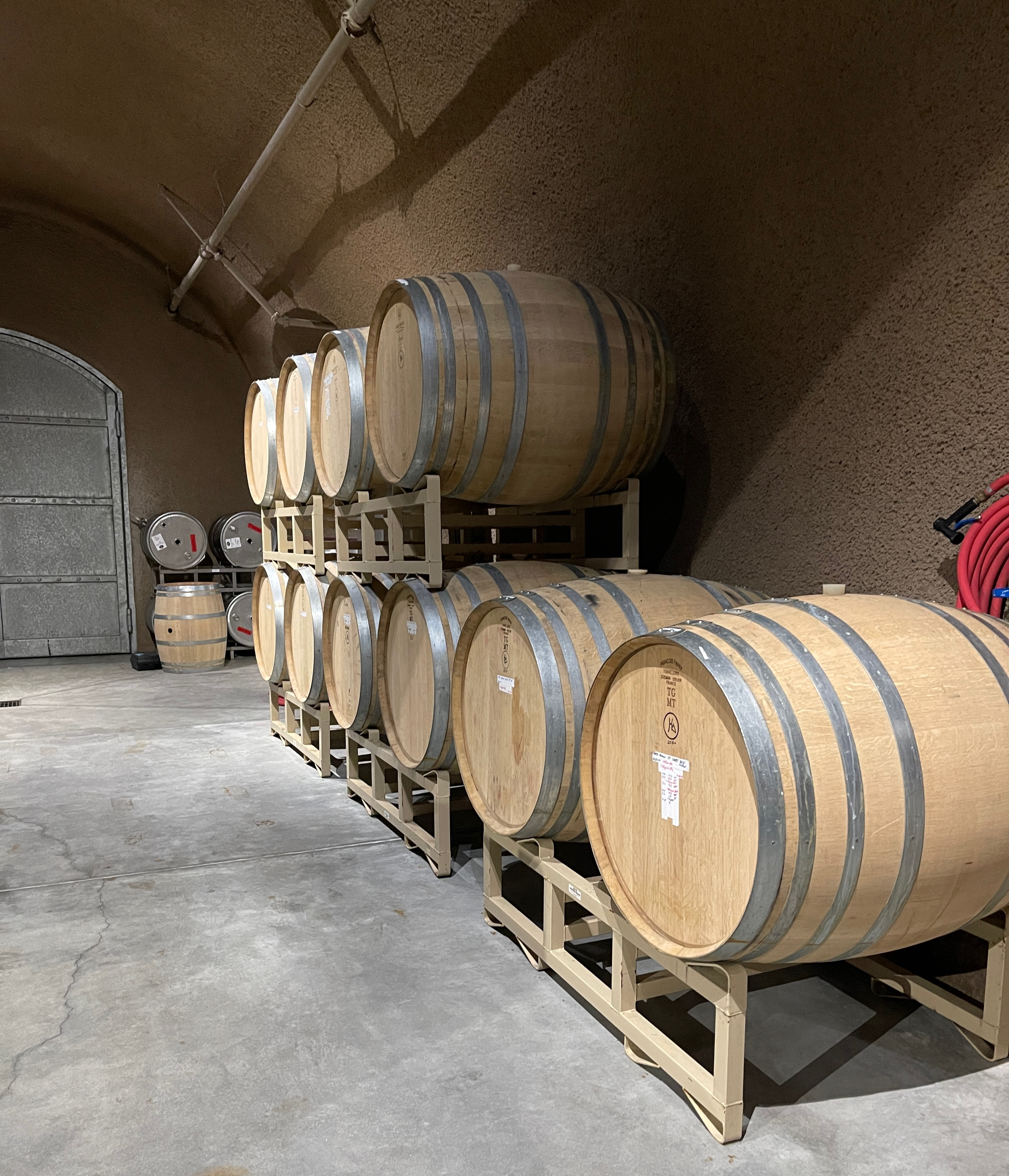
Holman Ranch Wine Barrels

Holman Ranch was originally part of the Rancho Los Laureles, a 6,625-acre (26.81 km^{2}) Mexican land grant was made to Vicente Blas Martinez and José Manuel Boronda (1803-1878), along with Boronda's son, Juan de Mata Boronda by Manuel Jimena on September 19, 1839. In 1868, the Boronda's son, Juan de Mata Boronda, sold the Rancho Los Laureles to Elihu Avery, who sold it to Ezekiel Tripp in 1874. Nathan W. Spaulding, later Oakland 's fifteenth Mayor, purchased a half interest on April 27, 1874. Abner Doble bought a half interest in 1875; Frederick Getchell and David Ayers in 1881; and Frank Hinkley a half interest in 1881.

In 1882, the Pacific Improvement Company purchased Rancho Los Laureles. In the 1900s the Pacific Improvement Company liquidated their holdings (10,000-acre (40 km^{2})) and the Del Monte Properties headed by Samuel FB Morse, acquired the land. William Hatton was manager. In 1923, they divided the land into 11 parcels, at $60 (equivalent to $1,107 in 2024) an acre. Golf champion Marion Hollins bought 2,000-acre (8.1 km^{2}). In 1926, Frank and Jet Porter, of Salinas bought 600-acre (2.4 km^{2}) of the southeast corner of Rancho Los Laureles, calling it Robles del Rio, California. The Porters later acquired a portion of the Marion Hollins ranch and sold the northeast corner of Rancho Los Laureles for an airpark.

In August 1928, Hollins sold a 400-acre (1.6 km^{2}) ranch to San Francisco broker Gordon Armsby. She commissioned architect Clarence A. Tantau, who helped design the Hotel Del Monte, to build a Spanish-style hacienda out of Carmel stone with terracotta roofing, and oak-beamed ceilings. It became a Hollywood retreat for Charlie Chaplin, Theda Bara, Marlon Brando, and Clark Gable. It was once called Casa Escondido (Hidden House).

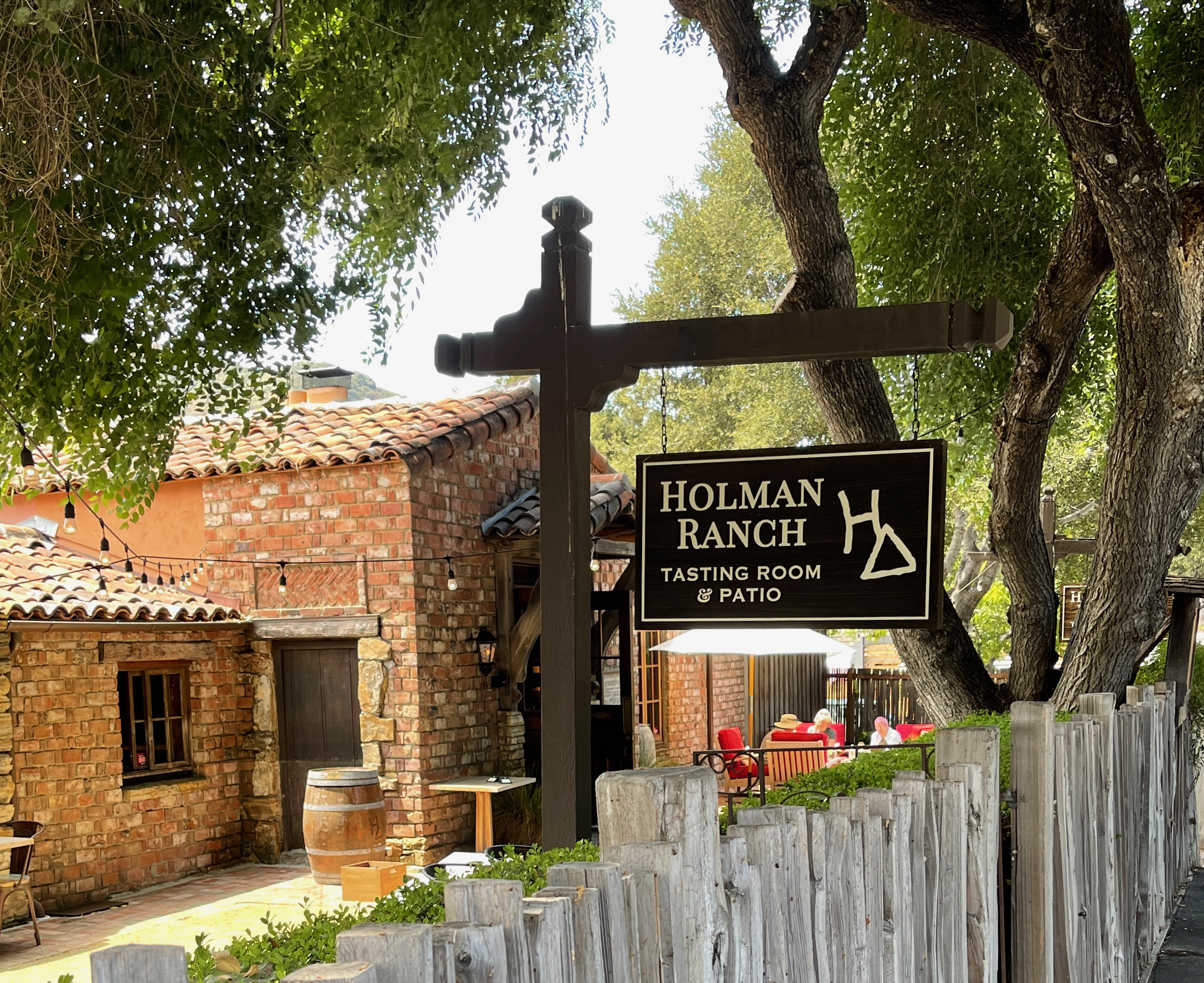
Holman Ranch Tasting Room is at West Carmel Valley Road.

In 2006, the Holman Ranch was purchased by Thomas and Jarman Lowder. They restored the hacienda, expanded the guest amenities, and planted 18 acres (7.3 ha) of vineyards for Pinot noir, Chardonnay, and Pinot gris. In 2012, an underground wine cave was built. In 2020, the Holman Ranch opened a tasting room and offers a venue for weddings and events.

== See also ==
- Napa County wine
- Ranchos of California
- Homestead (buildings)
- Ranch-style house
