= Hatton Canyon =

Canyon in Carmel Valley, California, United States

- Location within California Location within the United States

Geography
- Location: Carmel Valley Road
- Country: United States
- State: California
- Population center: Carmel Valley Village
- Coordinates: 36°33′9″N 121°54′22″W
- Interactive map of Hatton Canyon

Hatton Canyon is a canyon in Carmel Valley, California, United States, preserved for urban open space as a state park property. The canyon harbors Monterey pines and 10 acres (4.0 ha) of wetland.

== History ==
Hatton Canyon is currently accessible to the public at Carmel Valley Road via a dirt trail at the mouth of Carmel Valley. Plans to pave the trail to allow bicycle access were set aside in 2009 due to concerns of some neighbors.

The name Hatton Canyon came from William Hatton who became a successful dairy rancher, bought the west half of Rancho Cañada de la Segunda, gave his name to Hatton Canyon and to Hatton Fields on the west side of the highway.

For decades it was under consideration as a possible site for a 2.8-mile-long (4.5 km) freeway to relieve traffic on a parallel stretch of Highway 1. However homeowners and environmentalists opposed the plan since its proposal in 1952, ultimately gaining major political support in the 1990s. In 2002 Governor Gray Davis signed legislation that officially transferred the property from Caltrans to California State Parks.

== See also ==
- List of California state parks
