= Carmel Valley Road-Boronda Road Eucalyptus Tree Row =

Road in Carmel Valley, California, US

- U.S. National Register of Historic Places
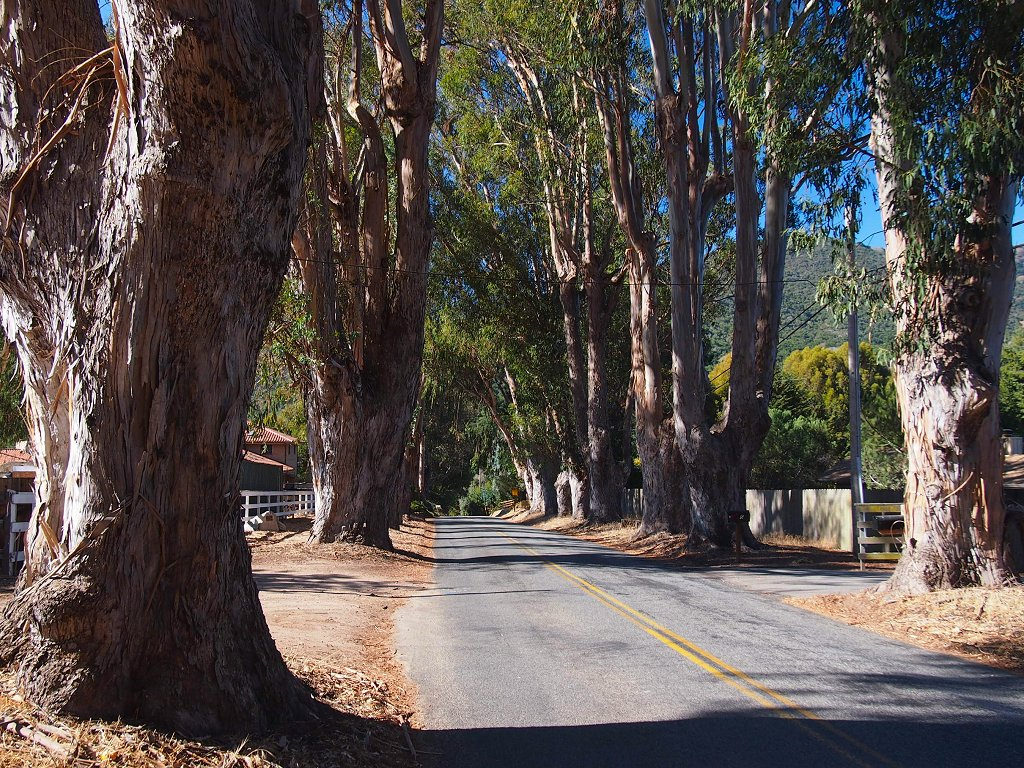
- Eucalyptus Tree Row at Carmel Valley Road and Boronda Road

- Location within California Location within the United States
- Location: 312 W. Carmel Valley Road, Carmel Valley, California
- Coordinates: 36°29′40″N 121°44′49″W
- Area: 1.2 acres (0.49 ha)
- NRHP reference No.: 07001352
- Added to NRHP: January 10, 2008

Eucalyptus Tree Row, also known as Carmel Valley Road-Boronda Road Eucalyptus Tree Row,, is located on Boronda Road off Carmel Valley Road in Carmel Valley, California. The unusual street side row of Eucalyptus globulus trees was planted sometime between 1874 and 1881, by Nathan Weston Spaulding, during the species' peak popularity in California for landscaping. The landscape feature was listed on the National Register of Historic Places on January 10, 2008.

== History ==
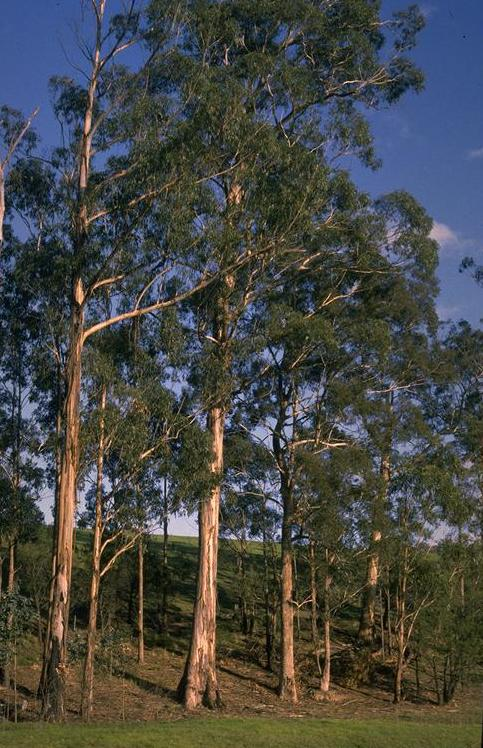
Eucalyptus globulus, or blue gum species.

The row of eucalyptus trees was planted, between 1874 and 1881, by Nathan Weston Spaulding (1829-1903), the 15th Mayor of Oakland, to establish an entry to his Rancho Los Laureles Ranch. This was at a time when planting eucalyptus trees had reached a great degree of popularity, promoted by American horticulturist and entrepreneur Ellwood Cooper, who arrived in California in 1870 and published the book Forest Culture and the Eucalyptus Trees in 1876. The row consists of 33 historic, 130-year-old trees between 36 and 120 inches in diameter. There are 6 along the 317-ft. Carmel Valley Road; 14 along the 370-ft north side of Boronda Road and 13 along the 581-ft south side of Boronda Road. All the trees are located on the public right-of-way and stand in their original positions.

The most common eucalyptus planted in California was the Eucalyptus globulus or blue gum, a species which can reach heights of 150–200 feet. It was often planted as a windbreak for farmlands such as those in Carmel Valley and Salinas. Large gatherings of blue gum eucalyptus can be seen at Garland Ranch Regional Park in Carmel Valley. During the malaria outbreak in the 1870 and 1880, the aroma of eucalyptus leaves was believed to provide health benefits. Eucalyptol, an oil derived from the leaves is used in the manufacture of medicines. The blossoms also provide nectar for bees.

In 1948, the 75-year-old eucalyptus trees were photographed as growing high along the Carmel Valley Road. By February 1957, the Carmel Valley Property Owners' Association voted to retain them. On October 26, 2007, a group of citizens applied for national historic status with the Monterey County Historic Review Board.

== Today ==
Today, the Carmel Valley Road-Boronda Road Eucalyptus Tree Row remains largely the same as when it was planted. It has significance as an example of landscape architecture. It has historical value as the only known landscaped eucalyptus tree row in Carmel Valley.

== See also ==
- National Register of Historic Places listings in Monterey County, California
