= Rancho Los Laureles =

Mexican land grant in California

- Mexican land grant
- Location within California Location within the United States
- Coordinates: 36.500°N 121.750°W

Rancho Los Laureles was a 6,625-acre (26.81 km^{2}) Mexican land grant in present-day Monterey County, California given in 1839 by Governor Juan Alvarado to José Manuel Boronda and Vicente Blas Martínez. Los Laureles refers to the California bay laurel tree. The grant extended along the Carmel River and the Carmel Valley, was bounded to the east by the Rancho Tularcitos and Rancho Los Laureles (Ransom) on the west, and encompasses present day Carmel Valley Village.

== History ==
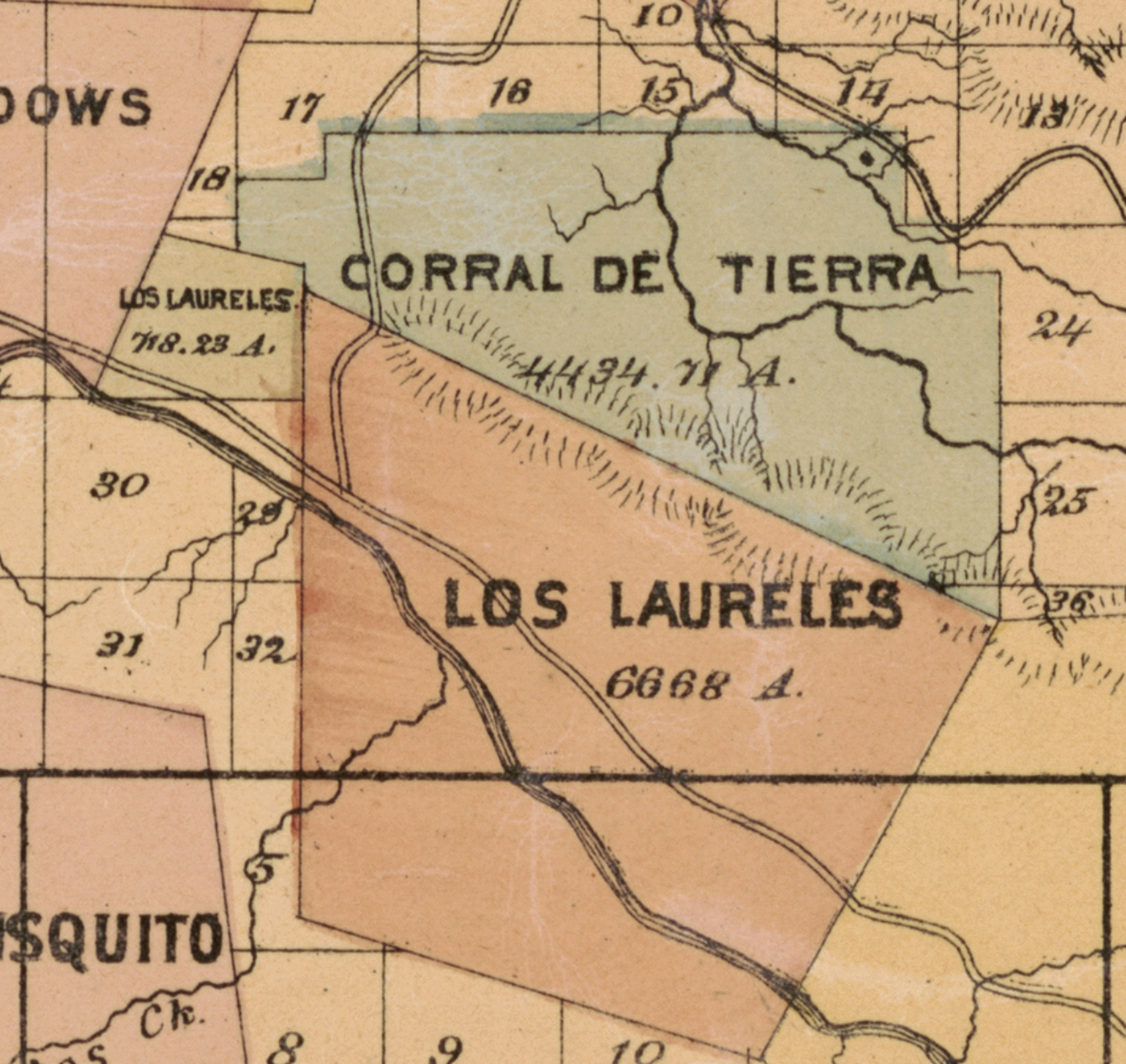
1877 Map illustrating the legal boundaries of Rancho Los Laureles.

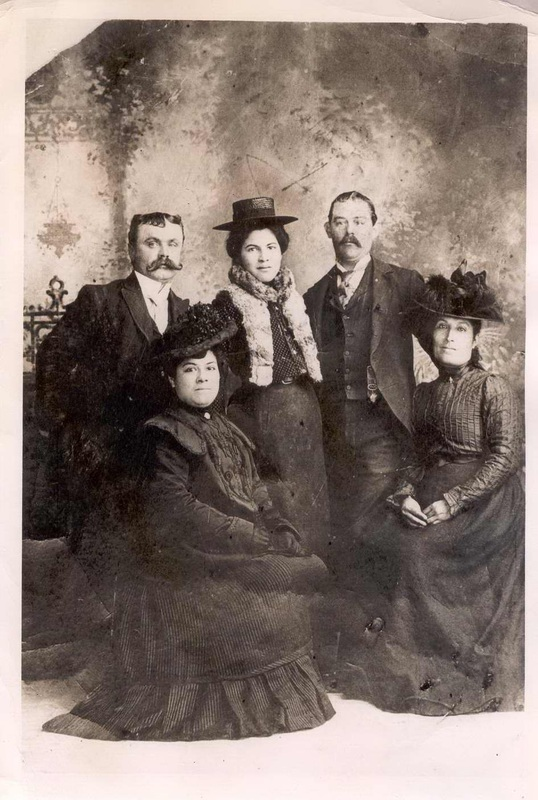
The Boronda family, a noted Californio family of rancheros in Monterey County, owned Rancho Los Laureles. Boronda, California, also in Monterey County, is named José Eusebio Boronda and located on his Rancho Rincón del Sanjón.

The one and a half square league grant was made to Vicente Blas Martinez and José Manuel Boronda, along with Boronda's son, Juan de Mata Boronda.

Vicente Blas Martinez married Maria Josefa Teodosia Amezquita (1801-) in 1817. In 1851, Vicente Blas Martinez and his wife, sold their half-interest in Rancho Los Laureles to the Borondas.

The Boronda family patriarch, Manuel Boronda (1750-1826) accompanied Junípero Serra's second expedition to Alta California. By 1790, Boronda was stationed at the Presidio of San Francisco and married Maria Gertrudis Higuera (1776-). Besides his military duties, which included carpenter work, Manuel also conducted a class for boys. The couple then moved to Santa Cruz. In 1811, at age 61, Manuel retired from military service and with his family moved to Monterey, where Manuel built an adobe house in 1817. The three sons of Manuel and Gertrudis Boronda were: José Canuto Boronda (1792-), José Eusebio Boronda (1801-), grantee of Rancho Rincón del Sanjón; and José Manuel Boronda (1803-1878).

José Manuel Boronda married Juana Cota (1805-1894) in 1821. Juana brought cheese to Carmel Valley, called Queso del Pais, which in Spanish means "cheese of the county." She used a Spanish original recipe to make her white-yellow cheese. David Jack is credited as being the first to market and popularize what was named Monterey Jack cheese. In 1840, José Manuel Boronda, his wife, and their 15 children, came to settle on Rancho Los Laureles.

With the cession of California to the United States following the Mexican-American War, the 1848 Treaty of Guadalupe Hidalgo provided that the land grants would be honored. As required by the Land Act of 1851, a claim for Rancho Los Laureles was filed with the Public Land Commission in 1853, and the grant was patented to José M. Boronda and Juan de Mata Boronda in 1866.

In 1868, the Borondas sold Rancho los Laureles for $12,000 (equivalent to $290,250 in 2025), to Elihu Avery, who sold it to Ezekiel Tripp in 1874. Nathan W. Spaulding, later Oakland 's fifteenth Mayor, purchased a half interest on April 27, 1874. Abner Doble bought a half interest in 1875; Frederick Getchell and David Ayers in 1881; and Frank Hinkley a half interest in 1881.

In 1882, the Pacific Improvement Company (PIC) purchased Rancho Los Laureles. In 1888, PIC hired William Hatton to manage their Del Monte dairies. In the 1900s the PIC liquidated their holdings (10,000 acres) and the Del Monte Properties headed by Samuel FB Morse, acquired the land. In 1923, they divided the land into 11 parcels. Marion Hollins bought 2,000 acres (810 ha). In 1926, Frank B. Porter bought 678 acres (274 ha) and launched the first residential subdivision in Carmel Valley that became Robles del Rio. The Porters later acquired a portion of the Marion Hollins ranch and sold the northeast corner of Rancho Los Laureles.

In August 1928, Hollins sold a 400-acre (1.6 km^{2}) ranch to San Francisco broker Gordon Armsby. She commissioned architect Clarence A. Tantau, who helped design the Hotel Del Monte, to build a Spanish-style hacienda out of Carmel stone with terracotta roofing, and oak-beamed ceilings. It became a Hollywood retreat for Charlie Chaplin, Theda Bara, Marlon Brando, and Clark Gable. It was once called Casa Escondido (Hidden House). Clarence E. Holman (1877-1962), eldest son of Rensselaer Luther Holman (1842-1909, the founder of Holman's Department Store in Pacific Grove, California, bought the ranch in 1943. In the 1950s and 1960s, Clarence created a working dude ranch called the Holman Ranch, with bungalows, riding stables, and a stone ranch house. After Holman died in 1962, his wife Vivian L. Ogden-Holman (1903-1981) continued hosting rodeos, horse shows, and an annual celebration of the ranch's birthday called, The Fiesta de los Amigos (Friends Party).

== Historic sites of the Rancho ==
- Los Laureles Lodge, Carmel Valley's original hotel and hunting lodge, now a Lodge, Restaurant and Saloon located at 313 West Carmel Valley Road, Carmel Valley
- Boronda Adobe, The home of José Manuel Boronda, located on Boronda Road in Carmel Valley. There are two other Boronda Adobes. These are the Boronda Adobe of Monterey built by Manuel Boronda and the adobe home of his son, the José Eusebio Boronda Adobe in north Salinas.
- Carmel Valley Road-Boronda Road Eucalyptus Tree Row, A row of Eucalyptus globulus trees planted by Nathan Spaulding along the Rancho's entrance road was listed on the National Register of Historic Places in 2008 as a prominent example of the species' use in California's landscape architecture.
- Stonepine Estate, The hotel located in Carmel Valley, Monterey County, California, United States. Stonepine Estate provides luxury accommodations, dining, weddings, corporate retreats, and equestrian activities. The property consists of two main areas: Chateau Noel and the Double H Ranch. It was once the oldest thoroughbred breeding facility west of the Mississippi.

== See also ==
- Ranchos of California
- List of Ranchos of California
