= Stonepine Estate =

Historic hotel in California

General information
- Location: Carmel Valley, California, United States
- Coordinates: 36.45894°N 121.71892°W
- Completed: 1920

Website
- Official Website

The Stonepine Estate is a 330 acres (1.3 km^{2}) hotel located in Carmel Valley, Monterey County, California, United States. Stonepine provides luxury accommodations, dining, weddings, corporate retreats, and equestrian activities. The property consists of two main areas: Chateau Noel and the Double H Ranch. It is listed on the National Registry of the Historic Hotels of America. It was once the oldest thoroughbred breeding facility west of the Mississippi.

== History ==
The estate was built in 1920 for Helen Crocker Russell (daughter of banker William Henry Crocker) and her husband, Henry Porter Russell, and was known as Double H Ranch, in the style of a Mediterranean estate. They had purchased it when the Rancho Los Laureles was subdivided. The ranch was purchased from descendants in 1983 by Gordon and Noel Hentschel and converted into a country resort, named Stonepine Estate. It is located in Carmel Valley, California, an unincorporated area of Monterery County.

According to the Monterey Herald, "It's here where the Crocker family — California royalty with an empire built on railroad ties and bank notes — lived a Gatsby-esque existence, replete with the Fitzgerald novel's themes of love, money, social classes and the American dream."

The Stonepine Estate Equestrian Center serves guests with private riding on the 330 acres (1.3 km^{2}) grounds of the estate, and also boards horses and serves as a training facility for the local community.

The resort was used to shoot the wedding of Eden Capwell and Cruz Castillo for the Santa Barbara TV series in 1988. It became listed on the National Registry of the Historic Hotels of America in 2019. In 2021, the estate with 400 acres (1.6 km^{2}) was listed for sale at asking price $70 million.
