= Harriet Clara Morse =

American writer (1872-1937)

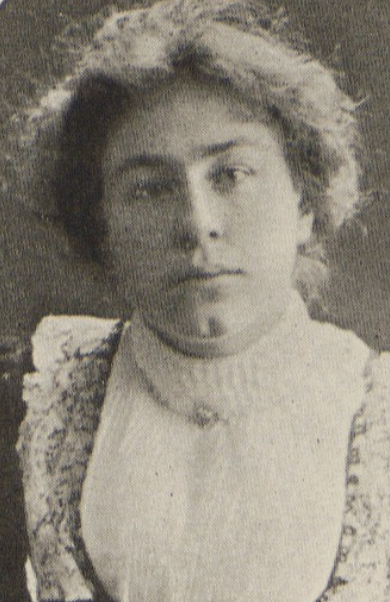
- Harriet Clara Morse, from the 1902 yearbook of Radcliffe College
- Born: August 24, 1872; Hyde Park, Massachusetts
- Died: January 30, 1937 (aged 64); Newtonville, Massachusetts
- Other name: Harriet C. Morse Richardson (after 1915)
- Occupations: Writer, clubwoman
- Relatives: Samuel Finley Brown Morse (brother)

Harriet Clara Morse (August 24, 1872 – January 30, 1937) was an American writer and clubwoman. Although she lived most of her life in Massachusetts, she wrote a Western novel, A Cowboy Cavalier (1908).

== Early life and education ==
Morse was born in Hyde Park, Massachusetts and raised in Newtonville, Massachusetts, the daughter of George Washington Morse and Clara Rebecca Boit Morse. Her father was a Union Army veteran of the American Civil War, and a lawyer in Boston. Her younger brother was Samuel Finley Brown Morse. She graduated from Radcliffe College in 1902. She pursued further studies at the Sorbonne.

== Career ==
After college and some travels in Europe, Morse taught music in Colorado, and took a year-long job as a tutor on a ranch near San Antonio, to research a Western novel. The result was her book, A Cowboy Cavalier (1908, sometimes known as The Sunset Trail), which was set in Texas, and illustrated by her brother. She followed that debut with another novel, Hermit of the Hemlocks (1910), set in Maine.

Morse was active in the Daughters of the American Revolution. She took several extended trips with her mother and sisters, and hosted dinners, musicales, and dances at her family's home in Newtonville. After marriage, she served on the board of trustees of the New England Peabody Home for Crippled Children.

== Publications ==
- A Cowboy Cavalier (1908)
- Hermit of the Hemlocks (1910)

== Personal life ==
Harriet Clara Morse married English-born mining engineer Nicholas Richardson in 1915. She died in 1937, in Newtonville, aged 64 years.
