= Rancho Los Laureles (Ransom) =

Mexican land grant in California

Coordinates: 36.530°N 121.780°W

Rancho Los Laureles (also called Rincon de los Laureles) was a 718-acre (2.91 km^{2}) Mexican land grant in present day Monterey County, California given in 1844 by Governor Manuel Micheltorena to José Agricio, an Ohlone Indian. The grant extended along the north side of the Carmel River and the Carmel Valley, was bounded to the east by the Boronda Rancho Los Laureles.

== History ==
The 2,000 varas square Rancho Los Laureles was granted to Jose Agricio, a resident of the Carmel Mission, in 1844.

Colonel Leander Ransom (September 5, 1800 – May 14, 1874), came to California in 1851 as the U. S. Deputy Surveyor General for California. Ransom established the Mount Diablo Base and Meridian lines in 1851. This was the initial point for surveying public lands in two-thirds of California and all of Nevada. Ransom also examined San Bernardino Mountain in southern California to see if it would be feasible to establish an initial point on its summit. Ransom served as Chief Clerk in the California Surveyor General's Office in San Francisco from 1851 to the 1860s. Ransom died in 1874 as the result of an accident, and was buried in Laurel Hill Cemetery in San Francisco.

With the cession of California to the United States following the Mexican–American War, the 1848 Treaty of Guadalupe Hidalgo provided that the land grants would be honored. As required by the Land Act of 1851, a claim for Rancho Los Laureles was filed with the Public Land Commission in 1853, and the grant was patented to Leander Ransom in 1871.
