= Carmel Valley, California =

Unincorporated community in California, United States

Carmel Valley
- Unincorporated community Census county division
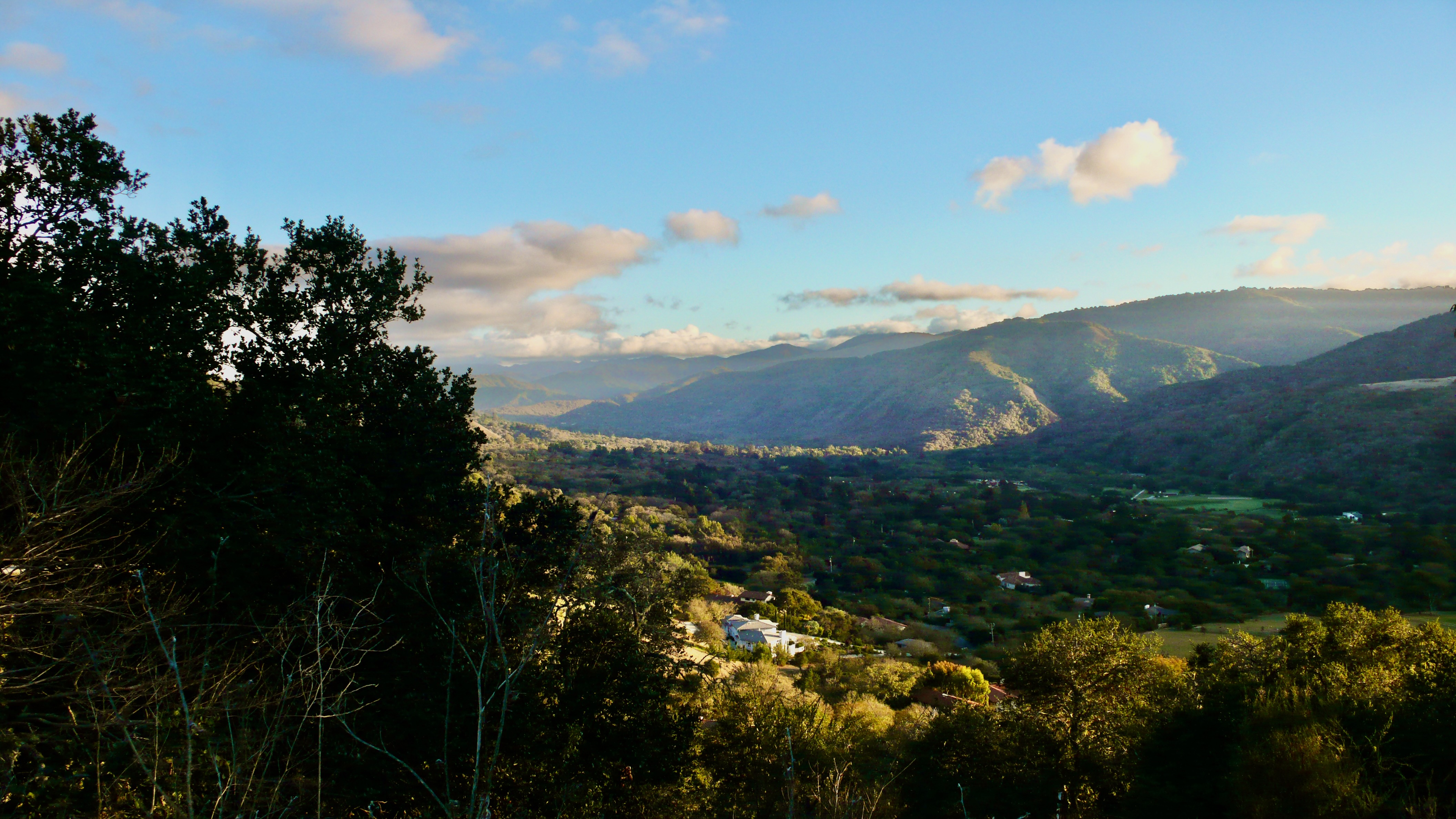
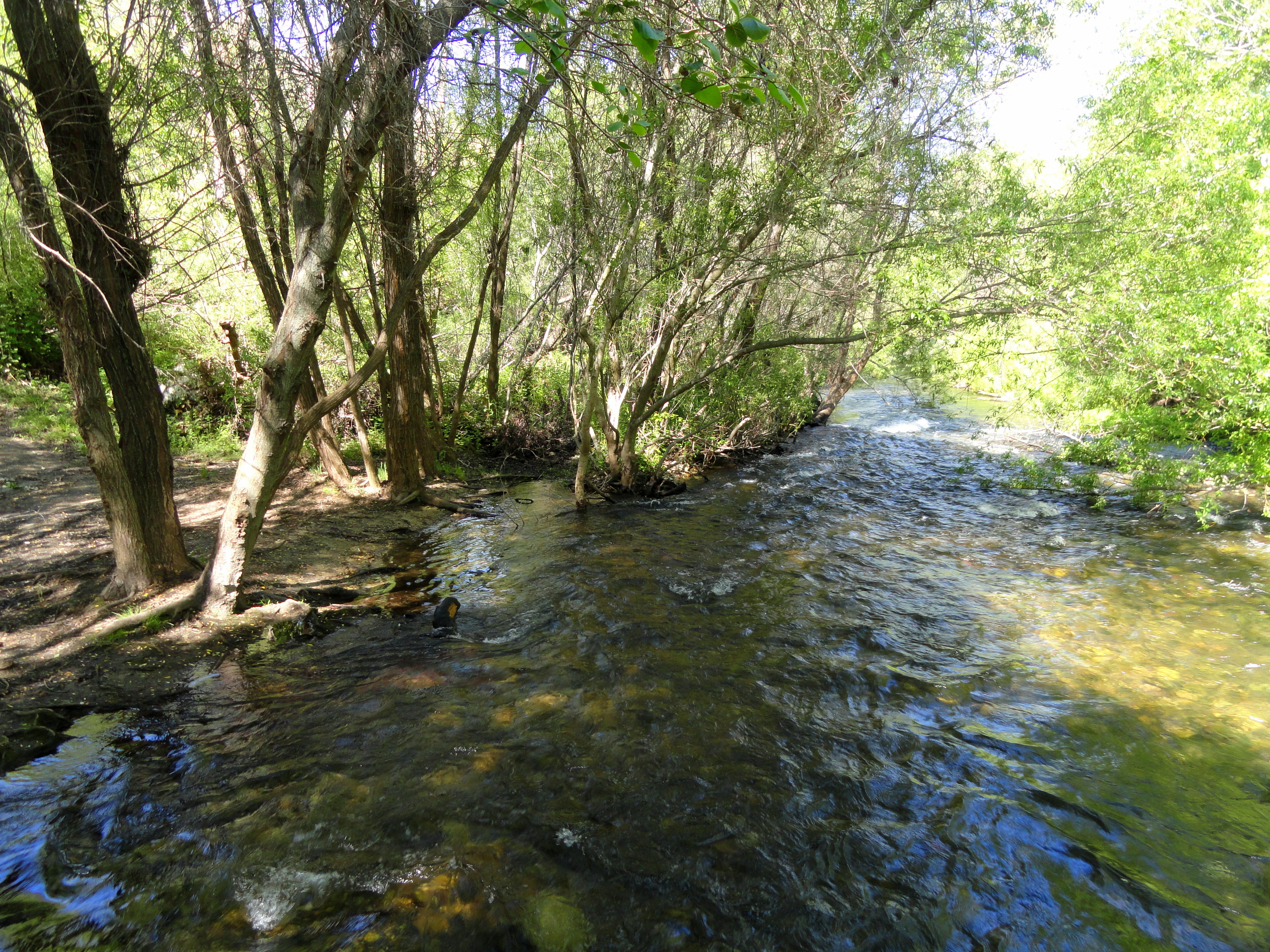
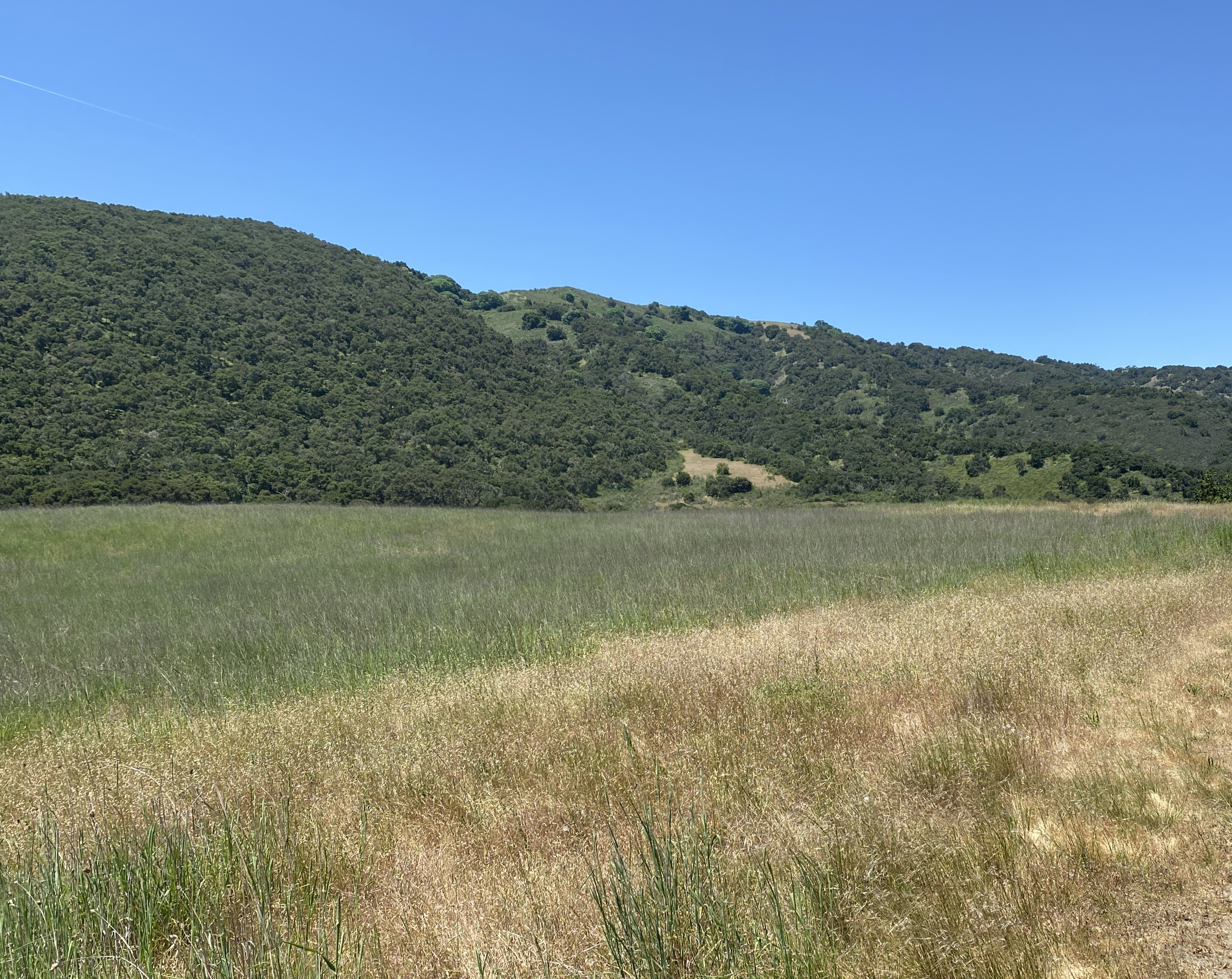
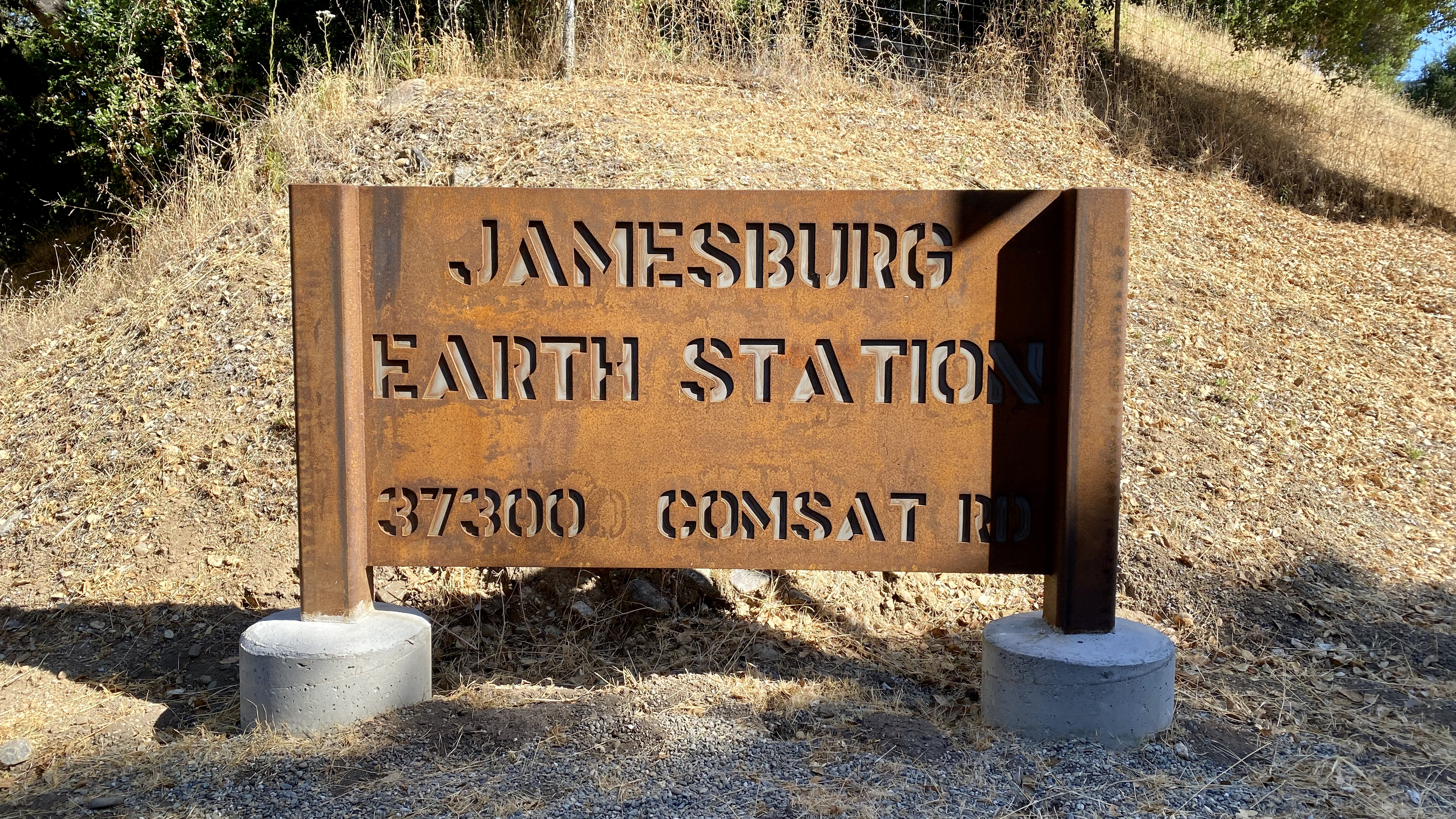
- From top down, left to right: Carmel Valley panoramio; Carmel River; Garland Ranch Regional Park; Jamesburg Earth Station

- Location of Carmel Valley in Monterey County and the state of California

- Location in California Location in the United States
- Coordinates: 36°28′38″N 121°44′22″W
- Country: United States
- State: California
- County: Monterey

Government
  - Board of Supervisors: Mary Adams (politician)
  - State senator: John Laird (D)
  - Assemblymember: Robert Rivas (D)
  - U. S. rep.: Jimmy Panetta (D)

Area
  - Total: 189.65 sq mi (491.2 km^{2})
  - Land: 189.05 sq mi (489.6 km^{2})
  - Water: 0.6 sq mi (1.6 km^{2})

Population (2020)
  - Total: 6,189
- Time zone: UTC-8 (PST)
  - Summer (DST): UTC-7 (PDT)
- ZIP code: 93924
- Area code: 831
- FIPS code: 0605390370
- GNIS feature ID: 270303

Carmel Valley is an unincorporated community in Monterey County, California, United States. The term "Carmel Valley" generally refers to the Carmel River watershed east of California State Route 1, and not specifically to the smaller Carmel Valley Village. For statistical purposes, the United States Census Bureau has defined Carmel Valley as a census county division (CCD), with an area covering approximately 189 square miles (490 km^{2}). At the time of the 2020 census the CCD population was 6,189. In November 2009, a majority of residents voted against incorporation.

== History ==
The earliest archaeological findings show that Carmel Valley had two separate tribes, the Esselens that lived in Upper Carmel Valley and the Rumsens lived from Mid-Carmel Valley to the mouth of Carmel Valley.

The mouth of Carmel Valley where the Carmel River runs into Carmel Bay was observed by Spanish explorer Sebastián Vizcaíno shortly before he landed in Monterey Bay in December 1602. He wrote about visiting the river on January 3, 1603, but greatly exaggerated its proportions, confusing later explorers. Vizcaino named it El Rio del Carmelo, likely because his voyage was accompanied by three Carmelite friars.

The Rancho Los Laureles, a 6,625-acre (26.81 km^{2}) Mexican land grant in present-day Monterey County, California, was given in 1839 by Governor Juan Alvarado to José Manuel Boronda and Vicente Blas Martínez. The grant extended along the Carmel River in Carmel Valley; and encompassed present day Carmel Valley. In 1882, the Pacific Improvement Company (PIC) purchased the Rancho Los Laureles. In 1916, Samuel F.B. Morse became the manager of the PIC and his job was to liquidate the PIC holdings (10,000 acres (4,000 ha)).

James Meadows (1817–1902) was an English-born immigrant who came to Monterey in 1838. In 1842, Meadows and Loreta purchased the 4,592 acres (1,858 ha) Palo Escrito Mexican land grant from Monterey businessman Thomas O. Larkin who had acquired several land grants in California. He donated land and helped found the Carmelo School, which was the earliest school in Carmel Valley. The James Meadows Tract was between the Rancho Cañada de la Segunda to the west, Rancho Los Laureles to the northeast, and Garland Ranch Regional Park to the south. His daughter, Isabel Meadows, was an Ohlone ethnologist and the last fluent speaker of the Rumsen Ohlone language.

William Hatton (1849–1894), born in Ireland and married to Kate Harney (1851–1922), came to California in 1870. In 1888, Hatton became the manager of Rancho Cañada de la Segunda, which extended along the north bank of the Carmel River into the mouth of Carmel Valley. The land was owned by Dominga Doni de Atherton, the widowed wife of Faxon Atherton (namesake of Atherton, California). By 1892, Hatton purchased the Rancho from Dominga. Hatton operated a dairy business, which was located at Highway 1 and Carmel Valley Road, at the site of the present-day The Barnyard Shopping Village.

The Berwick Manor and Orchard was located on Boronda Road off Carmel Valley Road in Carmel Valley. The farmstead was acquired in 1869 by Edward Berwick, a writer and educator as well as a scientific farmer. The manor and orchard was listed on the National Register of Historic Places on November 17, 1977. The Berwick Manor and Orchard was sold in 1961 and later subdivided into what is known today as the Berwick Manor Subdivision.

In 1919, Morse formed the Del Monte Properties and acquired PIC. In 1923, the Del Monte Properties divided the land into 11 parcels. Marion Hollins bought 2,000 acres (810 ha). In 1926, developer Frank B. Porter bought 600 acres (240 ha). He later acquired a portion of the Hollins ranch and sold it.

The Holman Ranch, originally part of the Rancho Los Laureles, passed through many hands until 1928, when San Francisco businessman, Gordon Armsby, purchased 400-acre (1.6 km^{2}) in Carmel Valley. He built a Spanish-style hacienda out of Carmel stone with terracotta roofing, and oak-beamed ceilings. It became a Hollywood retreat for Charlie Chaplin, Theda Bara, Marlon Brando, and Clark Gable. Today, the Holman Ranch is a privately owned winery, with a tasting room and offers a venue for weddings and special events.

Further up the valley was the Rancho Tularcitos. Settlement in the Cachagua area, situated further up the valley, took place in the 1870s and 1890s. This period coincided with the recession of the 1890s, which led people from the Salinas Valley to seek new opportunities in Cachagua. They migrated to the region and acquired small parcels of land, engaging in subsistence farming to sustain themselves during challenging economic times.

== Geography and ecology ==
According to the United States Census Bureau, the Carmel Valley CCD covers a total area of 189.65 square miles (491 km^{2}), comprising 189.05 square miles (489.6 km^{2}) of land and 0.6 square miles (1.6 km^{2}) of water. Within the CCD, the Carmel Valley Village lies on the eastern bank of the Carmel River while the community of Robles del Rio is located on the western bank. Carmel Valley Road (County Route G16) is the main route through the valley, connecting to California State Route 1 near the City of Carmel to the west.

The Carmel River drains the area of Carmel Valley. Primary ecosystems of the vicinity include California oak woodland, riparian woodland, chaparral, grassland and savanna. Dominant oak trees include Quercus agrifolia. The locale of Carmel Valley is also the northernmost range of the hybrid oak Quercus x alvordiana.

The Garland Ranch Regional Park is located at 700 West Carmel Valley Road. The Monterey Peninsula Regional Park District (MPRPD) manages the Garland Ranch Regional Park.

=== Climate ===
This region experiences warm dry summers (a Mediterranean climate according to the Köppen Climate Classification system), with average monthly temperatures peaking at 80.6 °F (27.0 °C) in September.

Climate data for Carmel Valley, California (2002–2020 normals) (records 1959–1978, 2002–present)
Month	Jan	Feb	Mar	Apr	May	Jun	Jul	Aug	Sep	Oct	Nov	Dec	Year
Record high °F (°C)	89 (32)	86 (30)	92 (33)	98 (37)	98 (37)	106 (41)	110 (43)	107 (42)	113 (45)	104 (40)	96 (36)	84 (29)	113 (45)
Mean maximum °F (°C)	77.3 (25.2)	77.5 (25.3)	82.1 (27.8)	86.2 (30.1)	89.3 (31.8)	93.1 (33.9)	92.5 (33.6)	95.4 (35.2)	100.1 (37.8)	94.5 (34.7)	85.5 (29.7)	74.6 (23.7)	102.4 (39.1)
Mean daily maximum °F (°C)	63.1 (17.3)	63.8 (17.7)	66.9 (19.4)	68.7 (20.4)	71.3 (21.8)	76.0 (24.4)	78.5 (25.8)	79.6 (26.4)	80.6 (27.0)	77.9 (25.5)	68.8 (20.4)	62.5 (16.9)	71.5 (21.9)
Daily mean °F (°C)	51.6 (10.9)	52.3 (11.3)	54.2 (12.3)	55.8 (13.2)	58.6 (14.8)	62.1 (16.7)	64.7 (18.2)	65.1 (18.4)	65.7 (18.7)	62.7 (17.1)	55.6 (13.1)	51.0 (10.6)	58.3 (14.6)
Mean daily minimum °F (°C)	40.0 (4.4)	40.8 (4.9)	41.5 (5.3)	42.8 (6.0)	45.9 (7.7)	48.3 (9.1)	51.0 (10.6)	50.6 (10.3)	50.7 (10.4)	47.6 (8.7)	42.4 (5.8)	39.6 (4.2)	45.1 (7.3)
Mean minimum °F (°C)	29.6 (−1.3)	30.7 (−0.7)	32.6 (0.3)	34.7 (1.5)	37.7 (3.2)	40.2 (4.6)	42.3 (5.7)	42.2 (5.7)	42.2 (5.7)	38.4 (3.6)	32.8 (0.4)	28.4 (−2.0)	26.5 (−3.1)
Record low °F (°C)	20 (−7)	23 (−5)	25 (−4)	31 (−1)	33 (1)	33 (1)	37 (3)	35 (2)	35 (2)	26 (−3)	27 (−3)	21 (−6)	20 (−7)
Average precipitation inches (mm)	3.94 (100)	3.51 (89)	2.80 (71)	1.36 (35)	0.54 (14)	0.14 (3.6)	0.03 (0.76)	0.06 (1.5)	0.05 (1.3)	0.78 (20)	1.74 (44)	2.99 (76)	17.94 (456)
Average precipitation days	10.5	10.2	9.9	7.6	3.8	1.0	0.2	0.1	0.8	2.9	6.7	12.2	66.7
Source: NOAA

== Demographics ==
=== 2020 ===
At the 2020 census Carmel Valley had a population of 6,189. The racial makeup of Carmel Valley was 5,502 White, 32 African American, 57 Native American, 126 Asian, 17 Pacific Islander, 270 from other races, and 685 from two or more races. Hispanic or Latino of any race were 624.

The age distribution was 1.7% under the age of 5; 16.0% under the age of 18, 84.0% 18 years and over; and 37.5% 65 or older. The median age was 58.8 years.

== Government ==
At the county level, Carmel Valley is represented on the Monterey County Board of Supervisors by Mary L. Adams, as the 5th District Supervisor.

In the California State Assembly, Carmel Valley is in the 17th senatorial district, represented by Democrat John Laird, and in the 29th Assembly district, represented by Democrat Robert Rivas. In the United States House of Representatives, Carmel Valley is in California's 19th congressional district, represented by Democrat Jimmy Panetta.

== Transportation ==
Carmel Valley Airfield is a defunct airfield that was a privately owned airpark in Carmel Valley from 1941 to 2002. The airport was later called the Carmel Valley Vintage Airfield. The historical resources commission found that development of the site was important as it represented the first planned residential airpark in the United States. The airfield closed in 2002. However, every year, during the annual Carmel Valley Santa’s Fly-in that is held around the Christmas time, Santa and Mrs. Claus arrive by helicopter and land on the old airstrip.

== Tourism ==
Carmel Valley has a number of wine tasting rooms, as well as several high-end hotels affiliated with the wineries. Wineries with tasting rooms in Carmel Valley include Holman Ranch, Bernardus, Boëté, Chateau Sinnet, Folktale, Galante, Georis, Heller Estate, Joullian Village, Joyce Vineyards, Parsonage, San Saba and Talbott. A public bus, called the Grapevine Express Route 24 and run by Monterey-Salinas Transit, stops at most of these tasting rooms.

The Monterey Wine Trolley also offers a tour on a former San Francisco trolley that makes stops at several wineries in the Monterey Peninsula and Carmel Valley.

== Folklore ==
The Lost Padre Mines of the Carmel Mission have woven themselves into the tapestry of local folklore, with their legacy recounted through various accounts, including those within Randall Reinstadt's notable works such as Ghosts, Bandits, and Legends of Old Monterey, Carmel and Surrounding Areas and Tales and Treasures of California Missions. These narratives unveil a captivating history, suggesting that indigenous communities held knowledge of abundant gold deposits concealed within the untamed terrain of the Santa Lucia Mountains. As whispers of these riches echoed through time, the enigmatic Lost Padre Mines became a testament to the allure of hidden treasures and the enduring mystique of the land. Numerous iterations of these legends appear to have originated from long-time residents of Carmel Valley. It is plausible that this phenomenon can be attributed to some of the final descendants of the Mission Indians who resided and labored in the area.

== Notable sites ==
- The Jamesburg Earth Station, one of the world's largest tracking satellite dish antennas, is located in Carmel Valley. This telecommunication facility was used by NASA during its Apollo Moon landings. Currently it is being used by Lone Signal, a crowdfunded active SETI project designed to send messages from Earth to an extraterrestrial civilization.
- Gold was hidden somewhere in Carmel Valley in 1855 during a dispute over a fortune belonging to Maria Encarnacion Ortega de Sanchez, the widow of a wealthy rancher. Chief Justice of California David S. Terry was involved in the so-called Widow Sanchez case.
- Stonepine Estate, a resort used to shoot the wedding of Eden Capwell and Cruz Castillo for the Santa Barbara TV series in 1988.
- Carmel Valley Road-Boronda Road Eucalyptus Tree Row is located on Boronda Road off Carmel Valley Road in Carmel Valley. The unusual street side row of Eucalyptus globulus trees was planted sometime between 1874 and 1881, by Nathan Weston Spaulding, during the species' peak popularity in California for landscaping. The landscape feature was listed on the National Register of Historic Places on January 10, 2008.

== Notable people ==
- Angelique Cabral, American actress
- Wah Chang, American designer, sculptor, and artist
- Martin J. Dain, American photographer and photojournalist
- Doris Day, American actress, singer, and animal welfare activist
- Scott Fujita, retired NFL football player for the New Orleans Saints
- Julian P. Graham, photographer of the Monterey Peninsula
- MC Lars, American rapper and producer
- Ingemar Henry Lundquist, inventor and mechanical engineer
- Michael Nesmith, musician, songwriter and filmmaker, former member of The Monkees
- Jimmy Panetta, Congressman
- Leon Panetta, former United States Secretary of Defense, former Director of the Central Intelligence Agency (2009–11), former Congressman (1977–93) and White House Chief of Staff (1994–97)
- Maurice White, founder of R&B/Soul group Earth, Wind & Fire
- Alexander Weygers, a polymath Dutch-American artist who patented the design of the discopter (the "flying saucer") in 1944

== See also ==
- List of places in California
