= Samuel Finley Brown Morse =

American environmentalist and businessman (1885–1969)

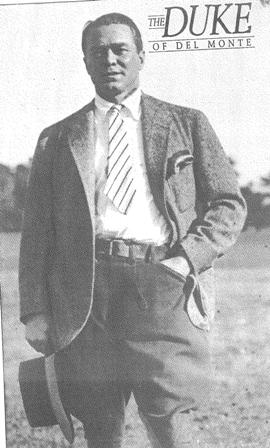
- Born: July 18, 1885; Newton, Massachusetts, U.S.
- Died: May 10, 1969 (aged 83); Pebble Beach, California, U.S.
- Education: Yale University
- Spouses: Anne Thompson (m. 1907; div. 1919) Relda Ford (m. 1919; died 1951) Maurine Church Coburn (m. 1952)
- Children: 4
- Engineering career
- Significant advance: Creating Pebble Beach; preserving and developing Monterey Peninsula
- Awards: Honorary doctorate U.C. Santa Cruz

Samuel Finley Brown Morse (July 18, 1885 – May 10, 1969) was an American environmental conservationist and the developer of Pebble Beach. He was known as the Duke of Del Monte and ran his company from 1919 until his death in 1969. Originally from the eastern United States, Morse moved west and fell in love with the Monterey Peninsula, eventually owning and preserving vast acreage while also developing golf courses and The Lodge at Pebble Beach.

== Early life ==
Samuel Finley Brown Morse was born in Newton, Massachusetts, the son of Clara Rebecca (Boit) and George Washington Morse, a soldier in the American Civil War and later a lawyer in Massachusetts. Morse's distant cousin, Samuel Morse was the inventor of the telegraph and Morse Code. His sister Harriet Clara Morse was a writer and clubwoman.

Morse attended Andover, like his father, and then Yale. At Yale, he was captain of the undefeated 1906 football team and member of the 1906 All-America Team. A member of Skull and Bones and Delta Kappa Epsilon, he was voted Most Popular in the Yale University graduating class in 1907.

Although he inherited a considerable sum upon his father's death in 1905, he decided to move out west to begin working on his own after graduation. In June 1907, Morse married Anne Thompson and moved to Visalia, California to begin working. Initially he worked for John Hays Hammond's Mt. Whitney Power Company with the help of a Yale classmate. He then ran the Crocker Huffman ranch in Merced for W. H. Crocker. During his first years in California, he and his family visited Monterey for the first time.

== Business and properties ==
In 1916, Morse was made manager of the Pacific Improvement Company, in charge of liquidating many of their assets. He formed his own company, Del Monte Properties, in 1919, in order to acquire these assets. Funded by Herbert Fleishhacker, he bought 7,000 acres (28 km^{2}) on the Monterey Coast including the Hotel Del Monte, Pacific Grove, Pebble Beach and the 11,000-acre (45 km^{2}) Rancho Laureles, now the Carmel Valley Village, and the Monterey County Water Works, all for $1.34 million.

Morse developed and rebuilt the land and properties of the Del Monte Forest, including eight golf courses including Spyglass Hill, Cypress Point, Pebble Beach and the Monterey Peninsula Country Club. He sold the Monterey County Water Works and operated a sand plant, among other ventures. Fortune magazine had an article describing the company as a "dying dream with a profitable sand business". During World War II, he also leased the Hotel Del Monte and land to the navy to be used as a flight school for 2000 cadets. After the war, the Navy bought the hotel to be used for the Naval Postgraduate School. After the war, Del Monte flourished once again. The resort also reflected a sign of the times as initially African Americans and "people under the former subjection of the Ottoman Empire" were not allowed to own property within Del Monte; however this ban was lifted in the 1960s by his son-in-law Richard Osborne, president of the company. In the late 1950s Morse proposed opening a shopping center in Monterey, which aroused much controversy and opposition from the downtown merchants. The proposal was later approved in 1963 and Del Monte Shopping Center opened in 1967.

== Personal life ==
Morse married his first wife Ann Camden Thompson on 29 June 1907 at Staatsburg-on-the-Hudson, Dutchess County, New York. They had three children and their marriage lasted until 1916. Their children, Samuel F.B. Morse Jr., John Boit Morse and Nancy Morse Borland lived in California before moving to Illinois. Morse then married Relda Ford, and had one daughter, Mary Morse Osborne Shaw. He later married his last wife, Maurine Church Dalton in 1952.

Morse bought back 500 acres (200 ha) of land located in Carmel Valley and named it River Ranch. He used it to entertain guests staying at the Hotel Del Monte and the Lodge at Pebble Beach. Guests included Jean Harlow, Ginger Rogers, Walt Disney, and others.
