= Robles del Rio, California =

Unincorporated community in California, United States

Robles del Rio
- Unincorporated community
- Location in California Robles del Rio (the United States)
- Coordinates: 36°28′12″N 121°44′00″W
- Country: United States
- State: California
- County: Monterey
- Elevation: 597 ft (182 m)

Robles del Rio (Spanish: Robles del Río, meaning "Oaks of the River"), sometimes spelled as Robles Del Rio, is an unincorporated community in Monterey County, California, United States. It is located west of the Carmel River in Carmel Valley, at an elevation of 597 ft (182 m). For statistical purposes, the community is part of the Carmel Valley Village census-designated place.

== History ==
The town was laid out by Frank B. Porter in 1927. Porter bought 678 acres (274 ha) in the southeast corner of the 11,000 acres (4,500 ha) Rancho Los Laureles from the Del Monte Properties Company. They named the tract Robles del Rio, “oaks of the river.”

In 1932, Porter built the Robles del Rio Lodge that was on 10 acres (4.0 ha), included 32 guest rooms, indoor and outdoor dining, pool, spa, tennis courts, and horse stables. He sold the lodge on 15 February 1939 to David Prince and William "Bill" Woods.

In 1932, Porter formed the Robles del Rio Carmelo Water Company to provide water to residents. After the golf course was discontinued in 1941, he deeded its 21 acres (8.5 ha) meadow to the Water Company.

During the Great Depression in the United States, Robles del Rio lots and land acreage were sold at 40% discount. Residential lots were sold as low as $90.

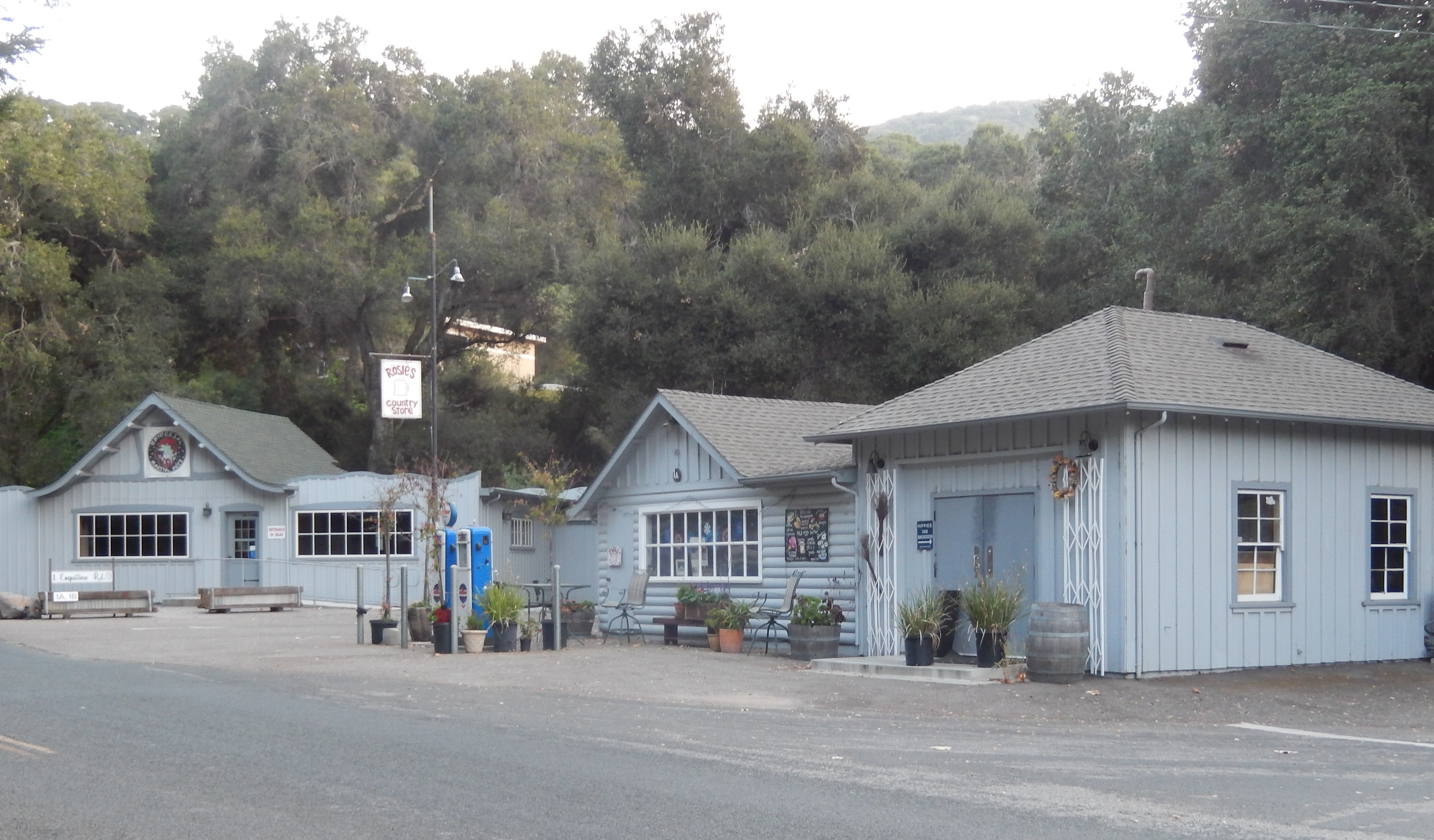
Rosie's Cracker Barrel, Robles del Rio

In 1941, Porter opened the Robles del Rio Post Office, that would become Rosie's Cracker Barrel. The Post Office had 150 mail boxes. In 1952, service was transferred to the Carmel Valley Village Post Office.

The Ridge Restaurant at Robles del Rio, was located inside the main lodge. The outside deck was enclosed on three sides with views of Carmel Valley. In May 2010, the Robles del Rio Lodge burned to the ground after being vacant for several years. The Carmel Valley fire department could not determine the cause of the fire. In 2012, the property was purchased by the Lee Sang Duk family.

== Government ==
At the county level, Robles del Rio is represented on the Monterey County Board of Supervisors by Mary Adams.

In the California State Legislature, Robles del Rio is in the 17th senatorial district, represented by Democrat John Laird, and in the 29th Assembly district, represented by Democrat Robert Rivas. In the United States House of Representatives, Robles del Rio is in California's 19th congressional district, represented by Democrat Jimmy Panetta
