= Pacific Improvement Company =

Holding company of the Southern Pacific Railroad

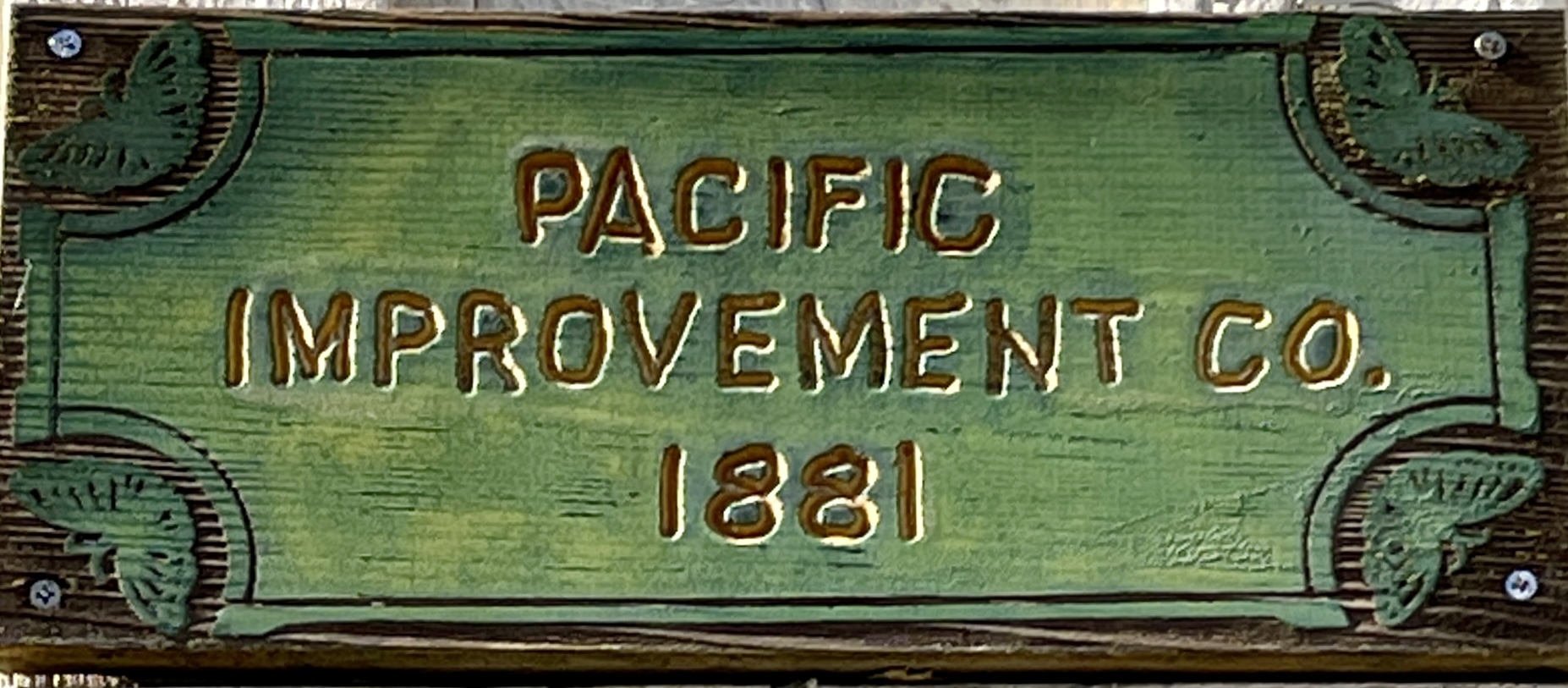
- Pacific Improvement Company Sign (1881).
- Company type: Holding company
- Industry: Railroad, Land development
- Predecessor: Western Development Company
- Founded: November 4, 1878
- Founder: Leland Stanford
- Defunct: February 27, 1919
- Fate: Acquired
- Headquarters: San Francisco, California, U.S.
- Area served: Western United States, Monterey Peninsula
- Products: railroads, hotels, land
- Owner: Southern Pacific Railroad

The Pacific Improvement Company (PIC) was a large holding company in California and an affiliate of the Southern Pacific Railroad. It was formed in 1878, by the Big Four, who were influential businessmen, philanthropists and railroad tycoons who funded the Central Pacific Railroad, (C.P.R.R.). These men were: Leland Stanford (1824–1893), Collis Potter Huntington (1821–1900), Mark Hopkins (1813–1878), and Charles Crocker (1822–1888). They owned the company, each with 25% interest. Archived records date from 1869 to 1931.

The company has been identified with many endeavors, including building the Hotel Del Monte in 1880, a large resort hotel in Monterey, California. By the 1880s, the Pacific Improvement Company was one of the largest corporations in the Western United States. The company controlled dozens of subsidiary companies, which conducted shipping, mining, publishing, land development, resort hotels, electric streetcars, and water system. Although it was criticized as a holding company to extract profits, the PIC had an important impact on the history of California. PIC was an active participant in the cause to erase Chinese American presence through actions such as tearing down any attempt to rebuild their fishing community.

== History ==
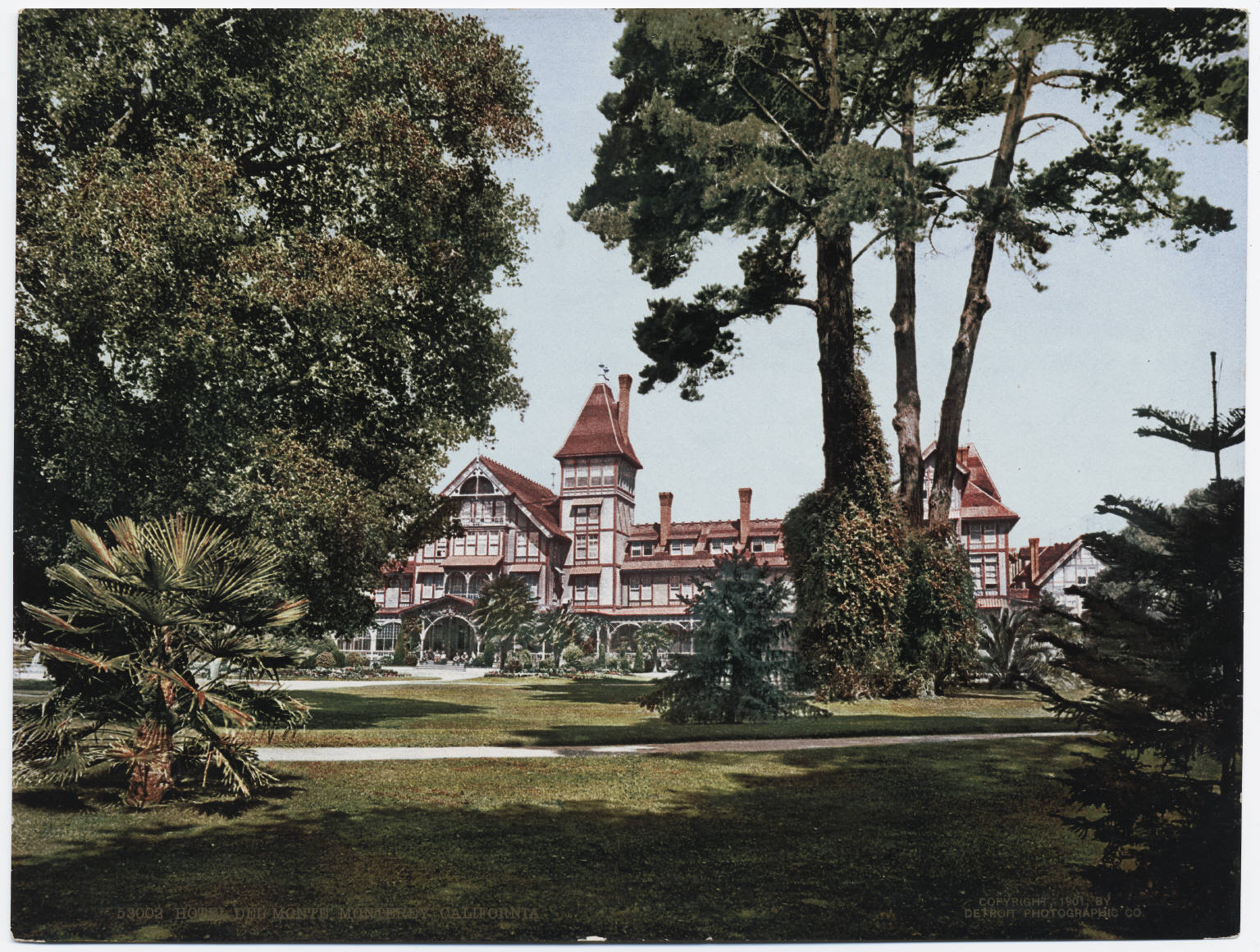
Hotel Del Monte built by the Pacific Improvement Company.

The Pacific Improvement Company (PIC) was incorporated in San Francisco, California on November 4, 1878. A copy of the articles of incorporation were filed in the office of the County Clerk in March 1879. It was the successor of the Western Development Company. The company was created for the "purpose of engaging and carrying on the construction, manufacturing, mining, mercantile banking and commercial business in all its branches." The principal place of business was at San Francisco. Capital stock was $5,000,000; divided into 5,000 shares of $100 each. Directors were J. H. Strobridge, F. S. Douty, Authur Brown, B. R. Crocker, and W. E. Brown.

Charles Crocker, one of the California's Big Four railroad barons, funded the Southern Pacific Railroad's property division of PIC.

In January 1880, the branch line of the Southern Pacific Railroad between Castroville and Monterey, California was completed. It was called the Del Monte Express. Charles Crocker chose Monterey as the site for a new seaside luxury hotel, which would be called the Hotel Del Monte. PIC purchased over 7,000 acres (2,833 ha) of ranch land for $35,000. The land included the site of the hotel in Monterey, two of the largest Spanish land grants, Rancho Punta de Pinos, and El Pascadero, which today includes the Del Monte Forest, Pebble Beach, and Pacific Grove.

The PIC and the Southern Pacific Railroad helped to build the town of Pacific Grove. The company contributed 10,000 to the construction cost to build the Methodist Episcopal Church. The Chautauqua Hall was built in 1881 by the Pacific Improvement Company for the Pacific Grove Methodist-Episcopal Camp Retreat. The hall still exists today and is located on the southwest corner of 16th Street and Central Avenue. It was called a "Hall in the Grove," and later became known as Chautauqua Hall.

In 1882, the PIC purchased the Rancho Los Laureles, which was located in Carmel Valley, California. Guests from the hotel could visit the lodge on the property to ride, hunt, and explore the trails. The Pacific Improvement Company built the Carmel River Dam in 1883, to deliver water to Monterey. 700 Chinese laborers built the dam by laying cast iron pipe to bring water out of Carmel Valley. The Pacific Improvement Company hired William Hatton to manage a dairy and ranching operation in Los Laureles.

In 1887, to secure a right-of-way west of Santa Barbara, California, the company purchased 2,000 acres (809 ha)acres from Thomas Hope's widow for $250,000. By the 1900s, the company sold "villa sites" from 2 acres (1 ha) or 50 acres (20 ha) acres in size.

PIC built the El Carmelo Hotel, which opened to guests on May 20, 1887. It was Pacific Grove's first hotel and sometimes called the sister of the Hotel Del Monte. It was located on Lighthouse Avenue between Fountain and Grand Avenues, Pacific Grove. In 1907, the name of the hotel changed to the Pacific Grove Hotel. In 1917, the PIC decided to dismantle it and use the wood in the reconstruction of The Lodge at Pebble Beach that had burned down on December 17, 1917. The empty block was sold to W. R. Holman in 1919 to open the Holman Department Store.

== Del Monte Properties ==
By 1899, all the original owners of the PIC had died. Their heirs wanted to dissolve the company and go their separate ways. However, its assets were not liquidated until after 1916, when real estate developer Samuel Finley Brown Morse was made general manager of the Pacific Improvement Company, in charge of liquidating all of the company's vast land holdings.

On February 27, 1919, funded by Herbert Fleishhacker, Morse formed the Del Monte Properties (DMP), and acquired the 10,000 acres (4,047 ha) holdings of PIC, in Monterey County, including the Del Monte Forest, the Del Monte Lodge, Hotel Del Monte, Pacific Grove, Pebble Beach and Rancho Los Laureles, now the Carmel Valley Village, California, and the Monterey County Water Works, for $1.3 million. Morse planned to use this land to develop a community within the forest centered around the Del Monte Lodge and had many plans for the rest of the area, including land for a golf course. In 1921, Morse replaced the Carmel River Dam with the San Clemente Dam to supply municipal water to the growing population on the Monterey Peninsula.

== See also ==
- List of ranchos of California
- Ranchos of California
