= William Hatton (businessman) =

Irish-born businessman

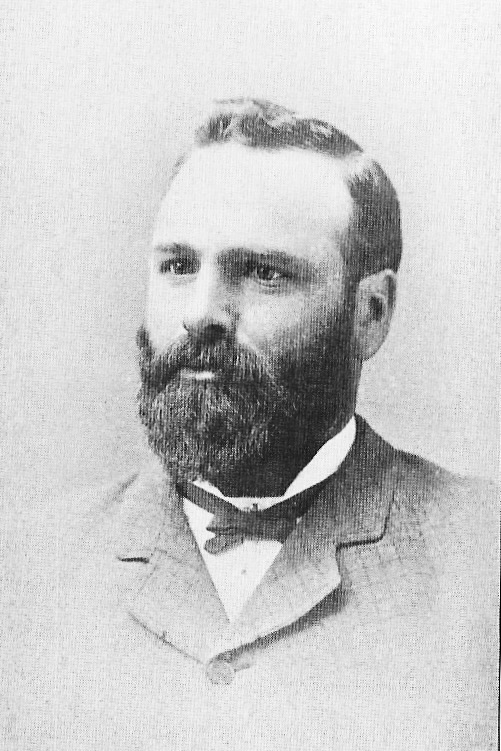
- Irish-born William Hatton (1849-1894)
- Born: June 9, 1849; County Wicklow, Ireland
- Died: 22 October 1894 (aged 45); Carmel Valley, California, US
- Occupation(s): Manager, farmer
- Spouse: Katherine Harney
- Children: 9

William Hatton (June 9, 1849 – October 22, 1894) was an American businessman in Carmel Valley, California. He was manager of the dairy and cattle interests of the Pacific Improvement Company,

== Early life ==
William Hatton was born on June 9, 1849, in Aghowle, County Wicklow, Ireland, fourth in a family of eight children. His father was Edward Hatton and mother Ann Kelly. He left Ireland at age thirteen and went to sea as an apprentice sailor. He lived a seafaring life for seven years, achieve the title of first mate. They had nine children in 18 years.

== Career ==
In 1888, the Pacific Improvement Company hired Hatton to manage two large Del Monte dairies, the Rancho Cañada de la Segunda in lower Carmel Valley and the ranching operations of Rancho Los Laureles in the upper Carmel Valley that the company purchased in 1882.

In August 1889, Hatton, as Superintendent of PIC, purchased the 49 acres (20 ha) Joseph W. Gregg ranch southeast of the Carmel River mouth off Highway One, on what is now the Odello Ranch. The Odello Ranch got its name from Battista Odello (1885-1963) who came to American in 1909. His family worked the ranch until 1995. They sold the west side field to the State of California and the east side to actor Clint Eastwood in 1996.

== Death ==
Hatton died on October 22, 1894, in Carmel Valley. Newspapers said that the immediate cause of death was a brain aneurysm. Further analysis determined it was bright's disease. He was buried in Monterey, California.
