= Garland Ranch Regional Park =

Public recreational area

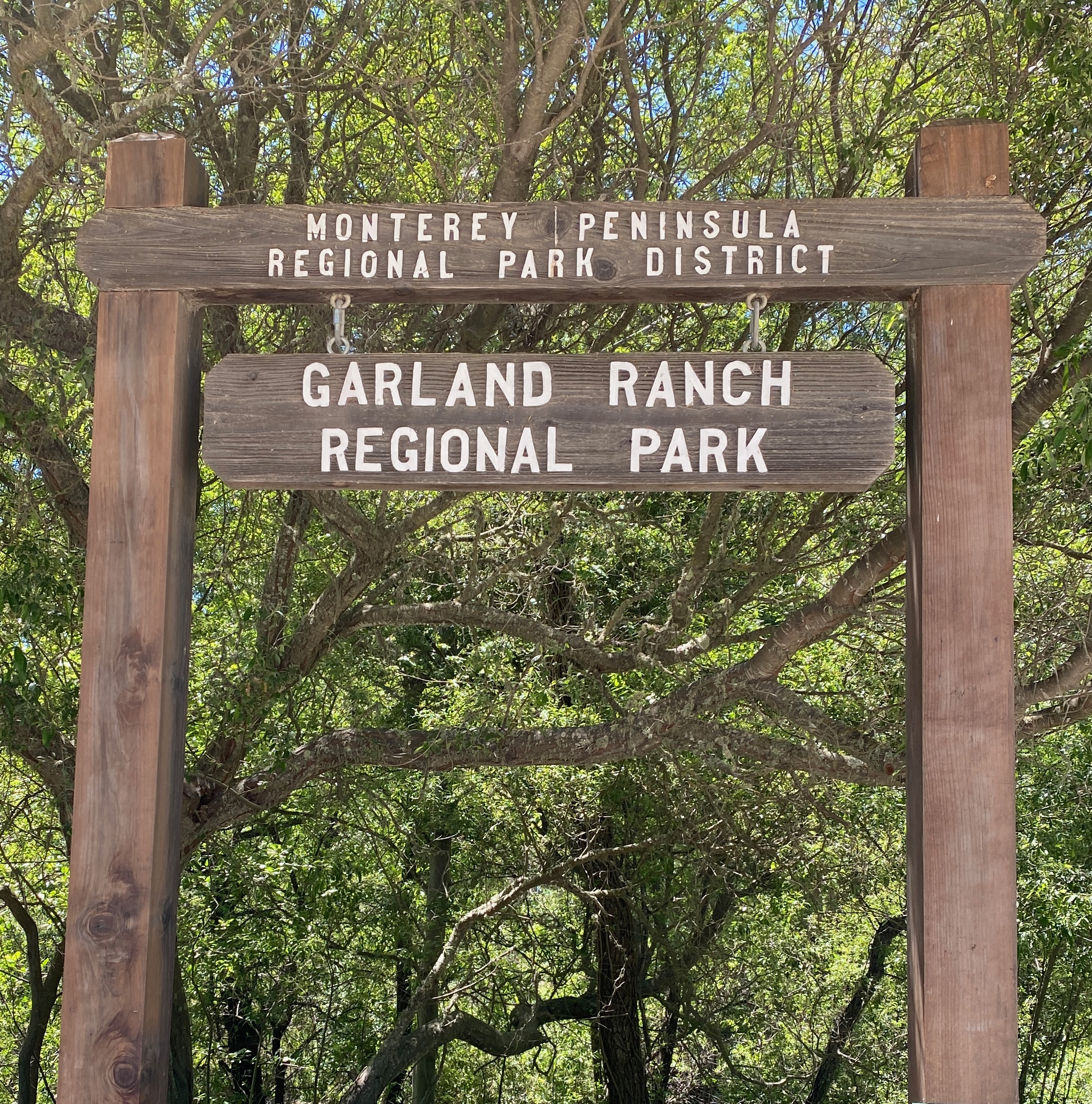
- The trailhead for the Garland Ranch Regional Park.

- Location within California Location within the United States
- Location: Monterey County, California, United States
- Nearest city: Carmel Valley, California
- Coordinates: 36.509384°N 121.767574°W
- Area: 541 acres (2.19 km^{2})
- Established: 1975
- Governing body: Monterey Peninsula Regional Park District

Garland Ranch Regional Park is a 3,464 acres (1,402 ha) public recreational area at 700 West Carmel Valley Road, in Carmel Valley, California. It is owned and managed by the Monterey Peninsula Regional Park District. It is located 18 miles (29 km) from Salinas on the south side of Carmel Valley Road on a .5 miles (0.80 km) stretch of the Carmel River It was the district's first land acquisition and was purchased in 1975 from William Garland II.

== History ==
The Rumsen Indian tribe lived in Mid-Carmel Valley, the mouth of Carmel Valley and neighboring Monterey Peninsula at the time of Spanish colonization.

In 1923, Marion Hollins bought 2,000 acres (809 ha) from the Del Monte Properties that held property in Carmel Valley. The ranch was later sold to William May Garland II around 1970, who also bought other ranches in the area. The ranch was located off Carmel Valley Road and extended across the Carmel River up to the hayfield called "La Mesa". This area is now just off Via Las Encinas road, which is now one of the trailheads, on the Garland Ranch Regional Park, called the Via Las Encinas trailhead.

On June 19, 1976, the Monterey Peninsula Regional Park District opened the Garland Ranch Regional Park. The park district acquired the Garland ranch in March 1975 from William May Garland II for $1.1 million, along with a $250,000 gift from Garland. After Garland died on May 10, 1975, the park district named the park after him.

== Habitat and conservation ==
Several ecosystems exist in the park and preserve. Garland Ranch Regional Park is home to native species such as deer, mountain lion and bobcat. Visitors are warned of the presence of the animals with signs at the entrance to the park and at the Visitor Center. Along with deer, other commonly seen animals are California quail, cottontail rabbits, crows, hawks, jays, lizards, western gray squirrels, turkeys, voles, white tailed kites, raccoons, bobcats, dusky-footed woodrats, and woodpeckers.

The most common eucalyptus planted in California was the Eucalyptus globulus or blue gum, a species which can reach heights of 150–200 feet. It was often planted as a windbreak for farmlands such as those in Carmel Valley and Salinas. Large clusters of blue gum eucalyptus can be seen at the Garland Ranch. There are plants and animals of the Monterey cypress (Cupressus macrocarpa) forest, Floodplain ecosystem, Monterey pine (Pinus radiata) forest, Coast Live Oak (Quercus agrifolia) woodland, and Redwood (Sequoioideae) forest. Monarch butterflies can be seen in the Monterey pine forest.

== Recreation ==
The 50 miles (80 km) of hiking and riding trails in Garland Ranch Regional Park are popular with riders, hikers, and joggers. One trail leads past a waterfall, and another is an 800-foot high "Inspiration Point" overlooking the valley. The park offers a number of hiking trails such as the La Mesa Trail which leads to the high grassland area. Other trails provide shorter easier loops. The park has beautiful views of Carmel Valley and interesting vegetation, with dense oaks woodlands, and canyons. Horse riding is allowed within the park. Almost all of the trails in the Open Space Preserve are open to equestrians. The Rancho Loop Trail takes you to the a packing shed, barn, and display of old farm equipment.

== Gallery ==
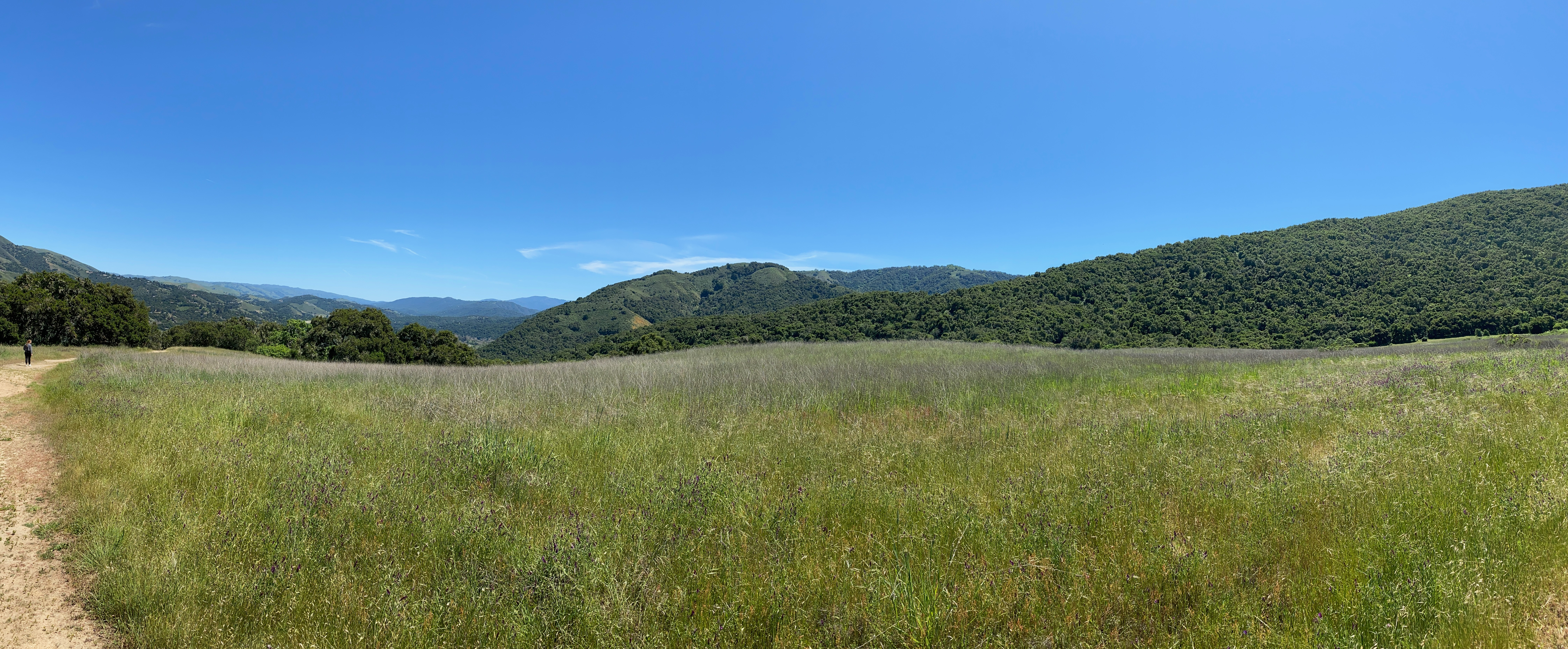
Mesa Trail

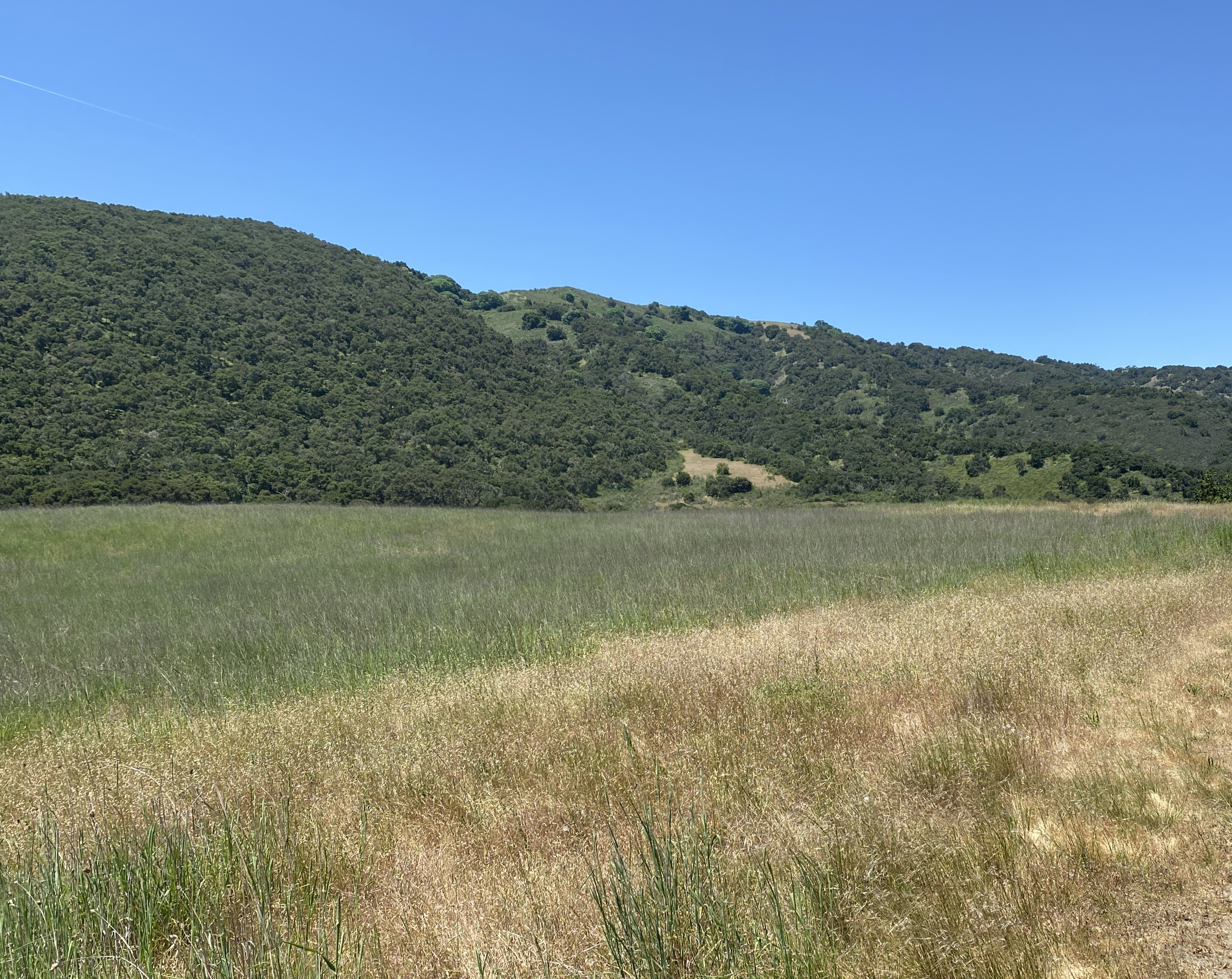
Via Las Encinas Trailhead

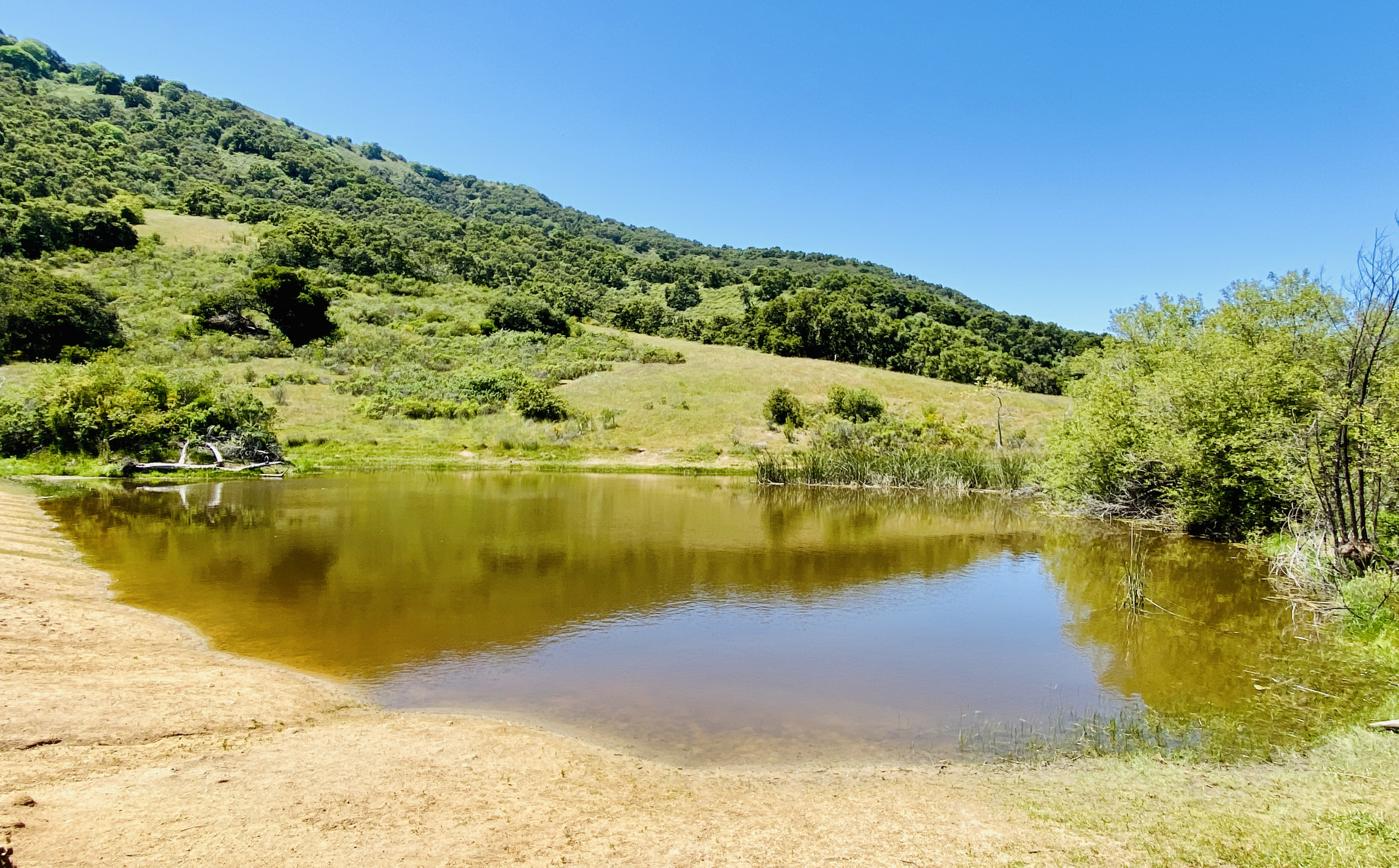
Mesa Pond

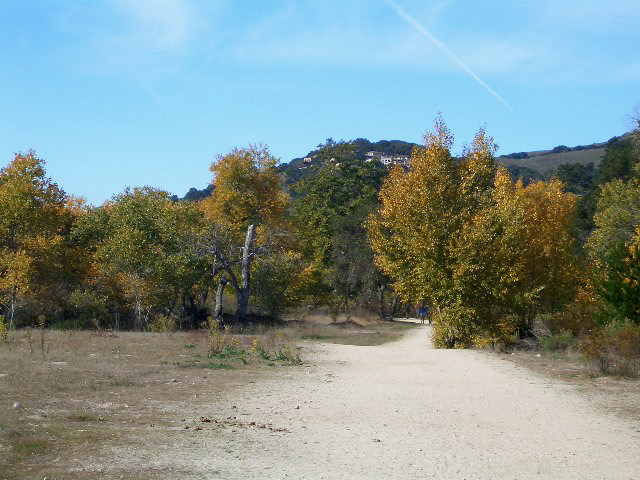
Lupine Loop

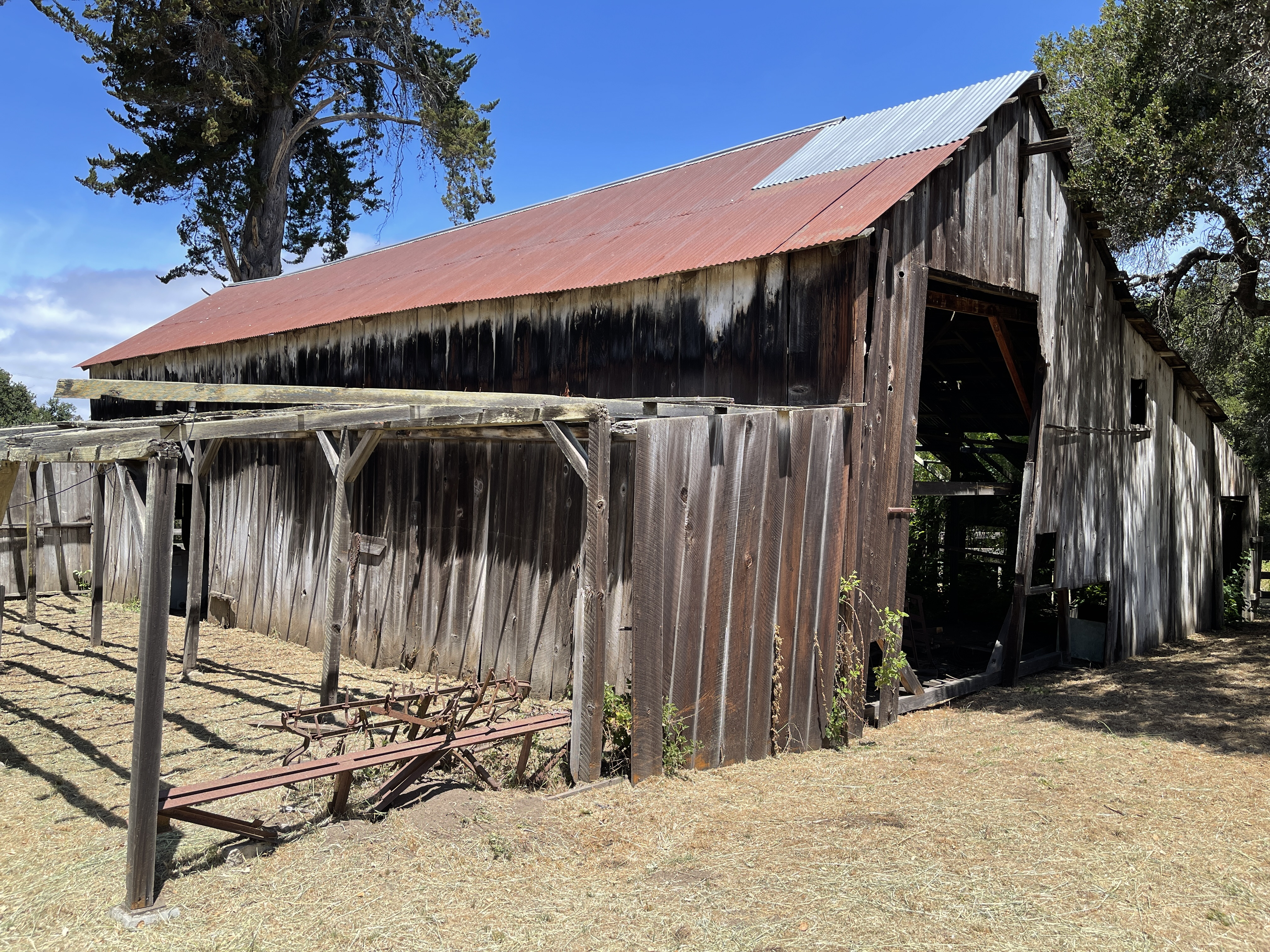
Barn at Garland Ranch Regional Park
