= Carmel Valley Village, California =

Unincorporated community in California, United States

Carmel Valley Village
- Census-designated place
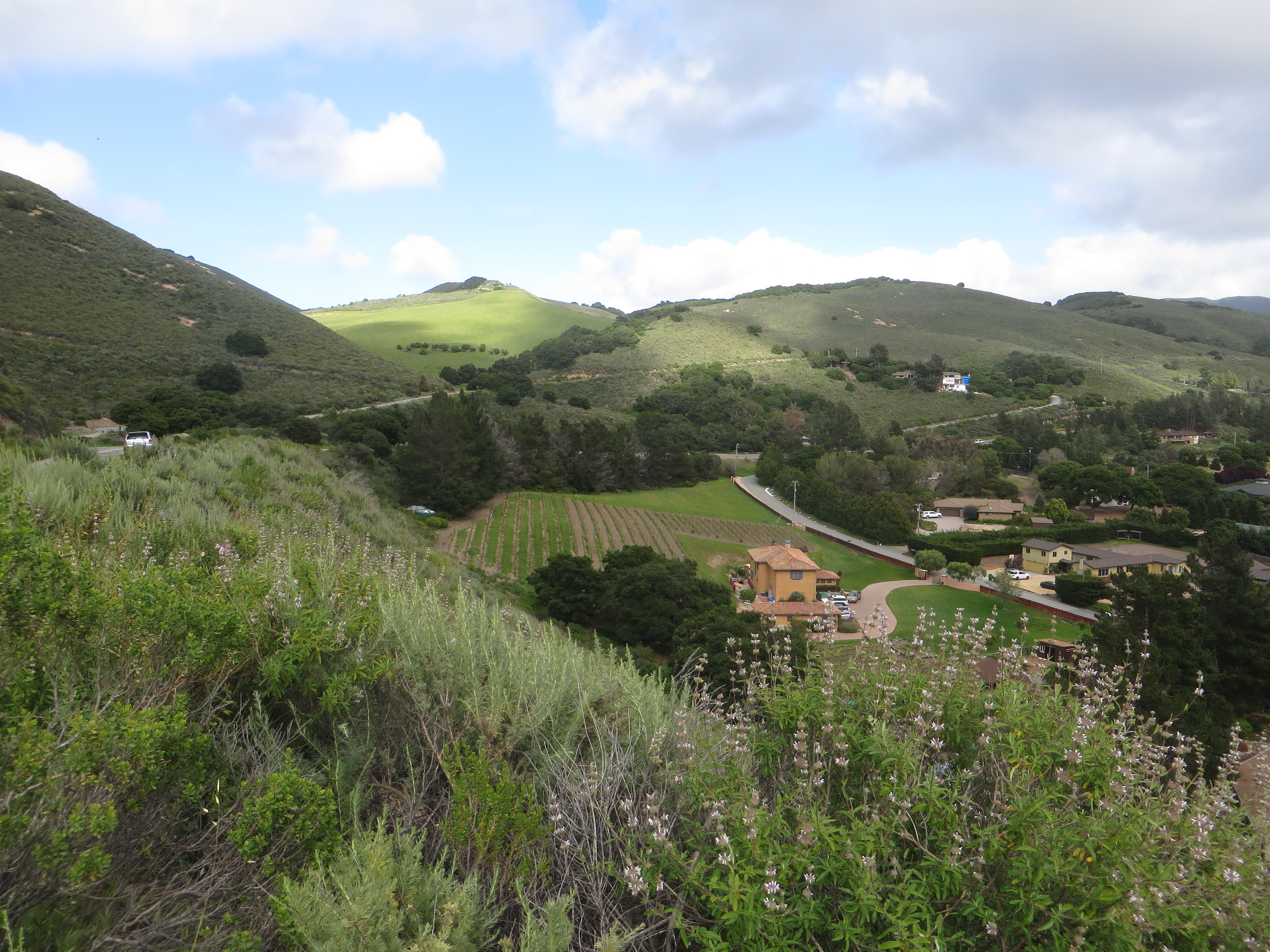
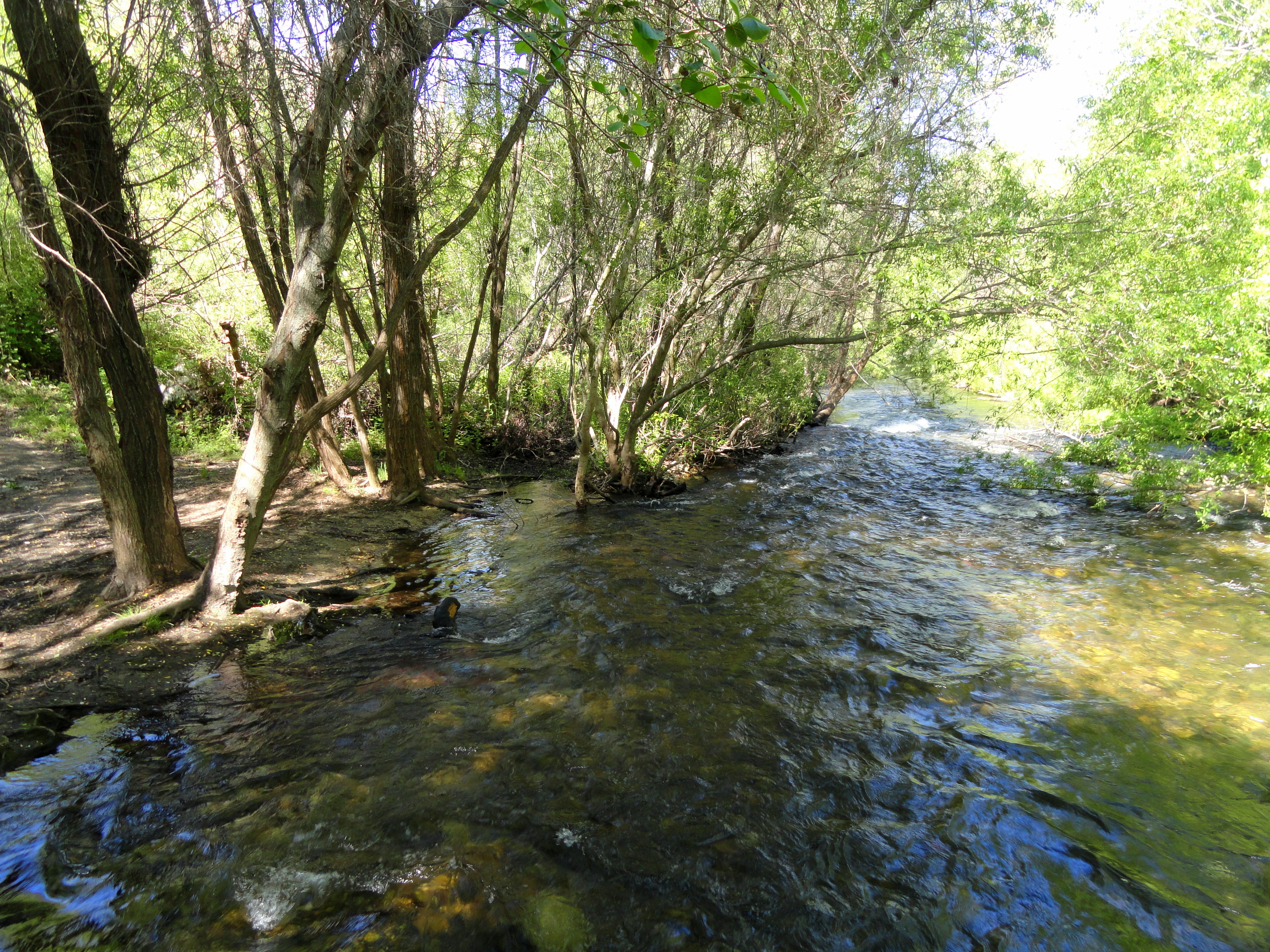
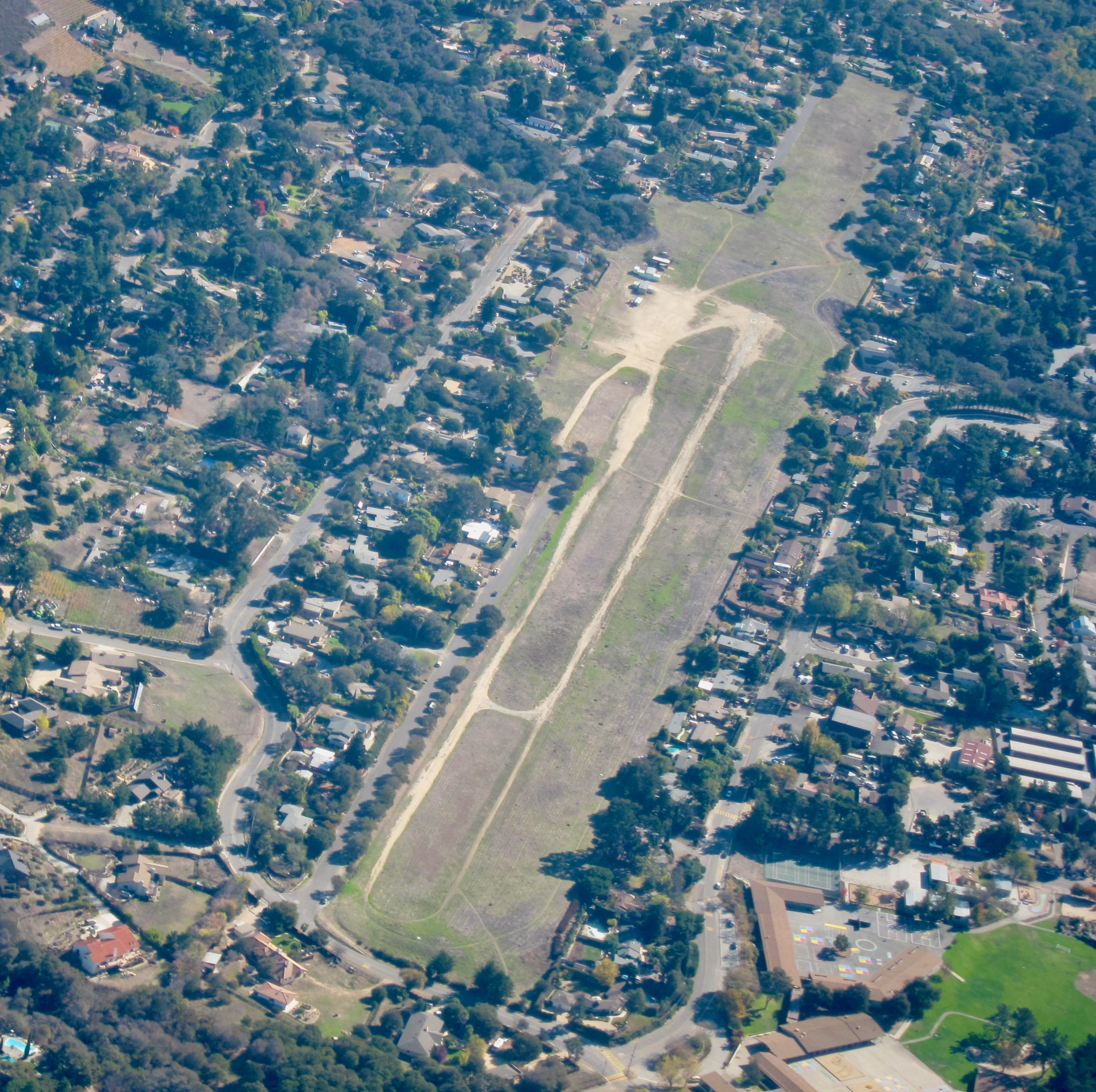
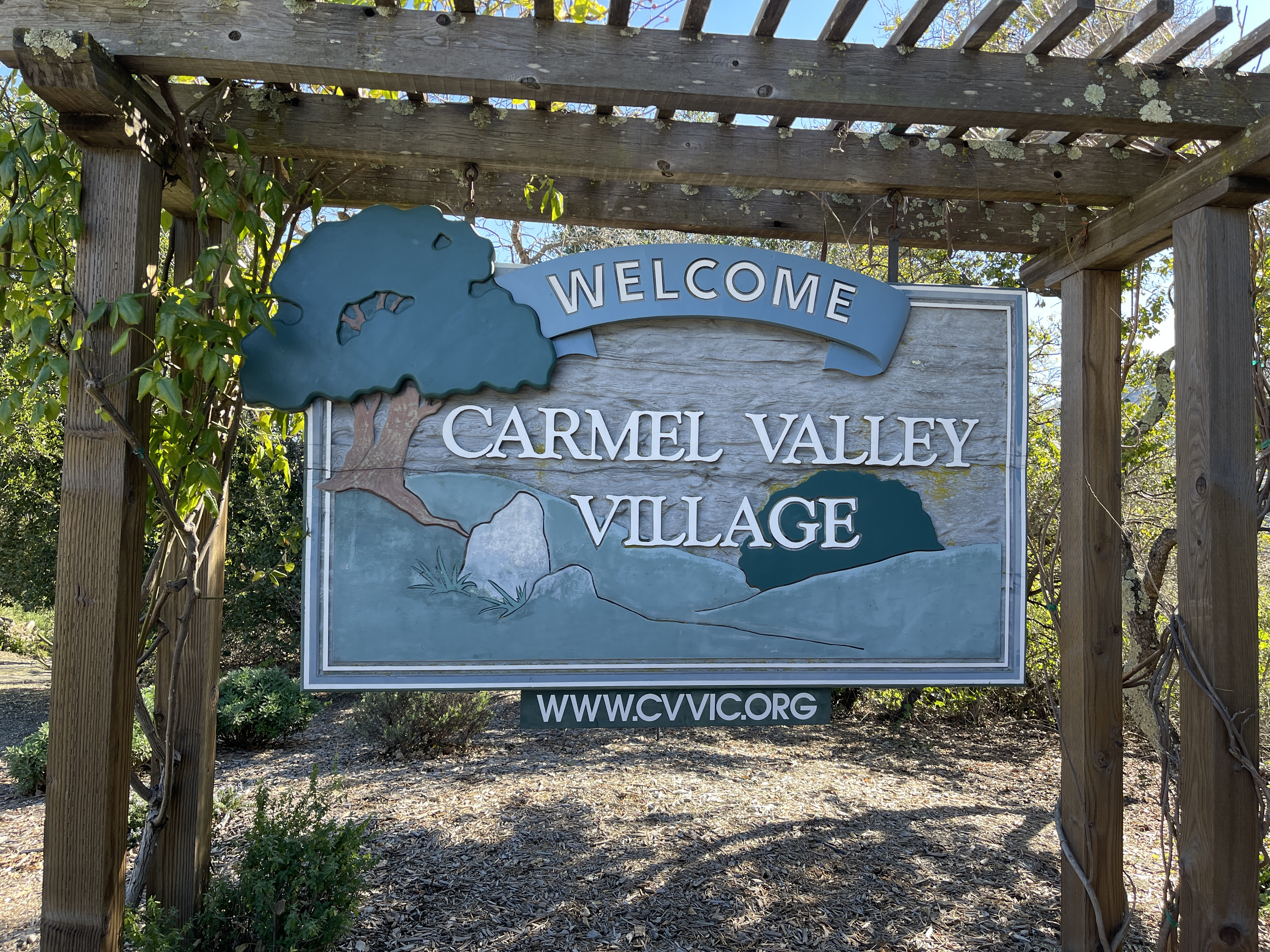
- From top down, left to right: Carmel Valley Village panoramio; Carmel River; Carmel Valley Airport; Carmel Valley Village sign

- Location in Monterey County and the state of California

- Location in the United States
- Coordinates: 36°29′10″N 121°43′26″W
- Country: United States
- State: California
- County: Monterey
- Founded as Airway Village: 1946
- Founder: Byington Ford and Tirey L. Ford Jr.

Government
  - Board of Supervisors: Mary Adams (politician)
  - State senator: John Laird (D)
  - Assemblymember: Dawn Addis (D)
  - U. S. rep.: Jimmy Panetta (D)

Area
  - Total: 19.18 sq mi (49.7 km^{2})
  - Land: 18.98 sq mi (49.2 km^{2})
  - Water: 0.20 sq mi (0.52 km^{2}) 1.02%
- Elevation: 846 ft (258 m)

Population (2020)
  - Total: 4,524
  - Density: 238.32/sq mi (92.02/km^{2})
- Time zone: UTC-8 (PST)
  - Summer (DST): UTC-7 (PDT)
- ZIP code: 93924 ("Carmel Valley")
- Area code: 831
- FIPS code: 06-11324
- GNIS feature ID: 1867002

Carmel Valley Village is an unincorporated community and census-designated place (CDP) in Monterey County, California, United States. At the time of the 2020 census the CDP population was 4,524, up from 4,407 at the 2010 census. In November 2009, a majority of residents voted against incorporation.

== History ==
The Rancho Los Laureles, a 6,625-acre (26.81 km^{2}) Mexican land grant in present-day Monterey County, was given in 1839 by Governor Juan Bautista Alvarado to José Manuel Boronda and Vicente Blas Martínez. The grant extended along the Carmel River and the Carmel Valley, and encompassed present-day Carmel Valley Village. In 1882, the Pacific Improvement Company (PIC) purchased the Rancho Los Laureles.

== Geography ==
Carmel Valley Village is in northern Monterey County, 13 miles (21 km) east-southeast of Carmel-by-the-Sea and 16 miles (26 km) southeast of Monterey. The Carmel Valley Village CDP comprises the main community of Carmel Valley on the northeast side of the Carmel River, as well as the community of Robles del Rio on the southwestern side of the river. The CDP has a total area of 19.2 square miles (50 km^{2}), 98.98% of which is land and 1.02% water.

The Carmel River flows northwestward through the community, reaching the Pacific Ocean at the city of Carmel-by-the-Sea. Primary ecosystems of the vicinity include California oak woodland, riparian woodland, chaparral, grassland and savanna. Dominant oak trees include Quercus agrifolia. The locale of Carmel Valley is the northernmost range of the hybrid oak Quercus x alvordiana.

The Garland Ranch Regional Park is located at 700 West Carmel Valley Road. The Monterey Peninsula Regional Park District (MPRPD) manages the Garland Ranch Regional Park.

=== Climate ===
The region experiences warm dry summers, with no average monthly temperatures above 71.6 °F (22.0 °C), with heat waves in the upper 70s to 101 degrees F. the further inland you go. According to the Köppen Climate Classification system, Carmel Valley Village has a warm-summer Mediterranean climate, abbreviated "Csb" on climate maps.

== Demographics ==
Historical population
Census	Pop.	Note	%±
1960	1,143		—
1970	3,026		164.7%
1980	4,013		32.6%
1990	4,407		9.8%
2000	4,700		6.6%
2010	4,407		−6.2%
2020	4,524		2.7%
U.S. Decennial Census; 1850–1870 1880-1890; 1900 1910 1920; 1930 1940 1950; 1960 1970 1980; 1990 2000 2010

=== 2020 census ===
As of the 2020 census, Carmel Valley Village had a population of 4,524. The population density was 238.3 inhabitants per square mile (92.0/km^{2}). The median age was 53.4 years. The age distribution was 17.4% under the age of 18, 5.2% aged 18 to 24, 16.9% aged 25 to 44, 29.0% aged 45 to 64, and 31.5% who were 65 years of age or older. For every 100 females, there were 87.8 males, and for every 100 females age 18 and over, there were 83.1 males.

The census reported that 99.5% of the population lived in households, 0.5% lived in non-institutionalized group quarters, and no one was institutionalized. 0.0% of residents lived in urban areas, while 100.0% lived in rural areas.

There were 1,854 households, out of which 21.5% included children under the age of 18. Of all households, 54.9% were married-couple households, 6.3% were cohabiting couple households, 13.8% had a male householder with no spouse or partner present, and 25.0% had a female householder with no spouse or partner present. About 25.9% of all households were made up of individuals, and 16.3% had someone living alone who was 65 years of age or older. The average household size was 2.43. There were 1,246 families (67.2% of all households).

There were 2,122 housing units, of which 1,854 (87.4%) were occupied and 12.6% were vacant. Of the occupied units, 71.3% were owner-occupied, and 28.7% were occupied by renters. The homeowner vacancy rate was 1.4% and the rental vacancy rate was 6.0%.

Racial composition as of the 2020 census
Race	Number	Percent
White	3,727	82.4%
Black or African American	25	0.6%
American Indian and Alaska Native	30	0.7%
Asian	97	2.1%
Native Hawaiian and Other Pacific Islander	12	0.3%
Some other race	170	3.8%
Two or more races	463	10.2%
Hispanic or Latino (of any race)	479	10.6%

=== Income and poverty ===
In 2023, the US Census Bureau estimated that the median household income was $164,167, and the per capita income was $96,475. About 4.3% of families and 6.2% of the population were below the poverty line.

=== 2010 census ===
At the 2010 census Carmel Valley Village had a population of 4,407. The population density was 229.8 inhabitants per square mile (88.7/km^{2}). The racial makeup of Carmel Valley Village was 4,044 (91.8%) White, 21 (0.5%) African American, 22 (0.5%) Native American, 70 (1.6%) Asian, 11 (0.2%) Pacific Islander, 120 (2.7%) from other races, and 119 (2.7%) from two or more races. Hispanic or Latino of any race were 328 people (7.4%).

The census reported that 4,403 people (99.9% of the population) lived in households, 4 (0.1%) lived in non-institutionalized group quarters, and no one was institutionalized.

There were 1,895 households, 447 (23.6%) had children under the age of 18 living in them, 988 (52.1%) were opposite-sex married couples living together, 162 (8.5%) had a female householder with no husband present, 72 (3.8%) had a male householder with no wife present. There were 104 (5.5%) unmarried opposite-sex partnerships, and 18 (0.9%) same-sex married couples or partnerships. 506 households (26.7%) were one person and 214 (11.3%) had someone living alone who was 65 or older. The average household size was 2.32. There were 1,222 families (64.5% of households); the average family size was 2.77.

The age distribution was 763 people (17.3%) under the age of 18, 220 people (5.0%) aged 18 to 24, 726 people (16.5%) aged 25 to 44, 1,788 people (40.6%) aged 45 to 64, and 910 people (20.6%) who were 65 or older. The median age was 51.7 years. For every 100 females, there were 93.8 males. For every 100 females age 18 and over, there were 90.1 males.

There were 2,156 housing units at an average density of 112.4 per square mile, of the occupied units 1,326 (70.0%) were owner-occupied and 569 (30.0%) were rented. The homeowner vacancy rate was 2.4%; the rental vacancy rate was 5.6%. 3,214 people (72.9% of the population) lived in owner-occupied housing units and 1,189 people (27.0%) lived in rental housing units.

== Government ==
At the county level, Carmel Valley Village is represented on the Monterey County Board of Supervisors by Supervisor Mary Adams.

In the California State Assembly, Carmel Valley Village is in the 17th senatorial district, represented by Democrat John Laird, and in the 30th Assembly district, represented by Democrat Dawn Addis.

In the United States House of Representatives, Carmel Valley Village is in California's 19th congressional district, represented by Democrat Jimmy Panetta.

== Education ==
Most of Carmel Valley Village is in the Carmel Unified School District. A small section is instead in Washington Union Elementary School District and Salinas Union High School District.

The majority part, in Carmel USD, is zoned to Carmel High School.

== Notable people ==
- Beverly Cleary, children's book author
- Doris Day, singer, actress, animal activist
- Jesse Metcalfe, actor known for his role in John Tucker Must Die

== See also ==
- List of places in California (C)
