= Nathan Weston Spaulding =

American politician

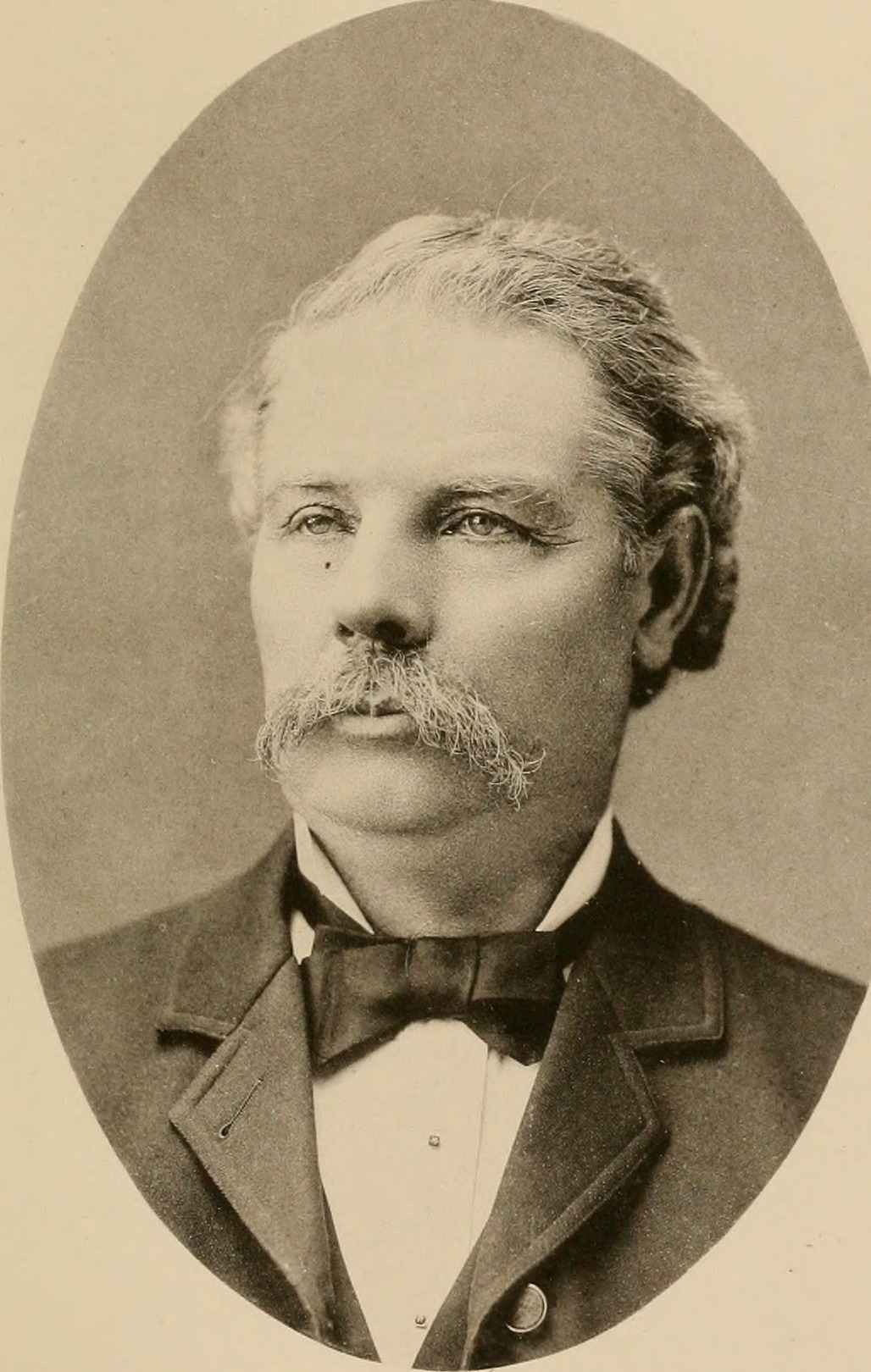

15th Mayor of Oakland, California
- In office March 1, 1871 – March 5, 1873
- Preceded by: John B. Felton
- Succeeded by: Henry Durant

Personal details
- Born: September 24, 1829 North Anson, Maine, U.S.
- Died: October 8, 1903 (aged 74) New Britain, Connecticut, U.S.
- Resting place: Mountain View Cemetery (Oakland, California)
- Party: Republican
- Spouse: Mary Theresa Clinkenbeard (m. 1854)
- Children: 2
- Relatives: Kinzea Stone Clinkenbeard (brother-in-law)
- Occupation: Politician

Nathan Weston Spaulding (September 24, 1829 – October 8, 1903) was an American politician and landowner who served as the 15th Mayor of Oakland, California (1871–1873). He created the Pacific Saw Manufacturing Company, which manufactured and sold all types of saws.

== Early life ==
Spaulding was born in North Anson, Maine on September 24, 1829, the oldest of eight boys. His father, Walter Spaulding (1801–1857) was a teacher and a "practical-mechanic." He was a descendant of Edward Spaulding (1600–1670), who was an early settler in the colony of Norfolk, Massachusetts.

== Career ==
While on the East Coast, Spaulding learned the trades of carpenter, builder and millwright from his father and uncle. By the age of 20, he worked as a carpenter in Boston and in Portland, Maine.

In 1851, he sailed from New York for the gold fields of California by way of the Panama Canal, where he pioneered in the building of mills and flumes on the Mokelumne River in Calaveras County. He worked at the first quartz sawmill ever built in the state and then built and managed the first hotel in Campo Seco, California by, the Mokelumne River in 1852, where he met his wife. Shortly afterwards, a fire destroyed the hotel, and all but destroyed the town. Nathan and Mary moved then moved to the town of Clinton in Amador County, Northern California, and built another sawmill and two bridges, which spanned the Mokelumne River.

He went on to become president and manager of N. W. Spaulding & Brothers in Chicago, Illinois with two of his brothers. The company made large circular saws with inserted teeth, chisel-bits and saw-mill machinery.

He later sold the property to the Pacific Improvement Company, owner of the Hotel Del Monte in Monterey, which wanted the water rights as well as a game preserve for hotel guests.

In 1868, the Spauldings moved to Oakland. He built two mansions, one at 9th and Madison Streets and later one in Highland Park, East Oakland. He was a Unitarian and member of the Independent Church of Oakland, where he was a director and president of the society.

Spaulding was the mayor of Oakland from 1871 to 1873. He was elected twice as mayor, in 1871 and 1872. The second time he ran, he was unopposed. While he was mayor, the site of the present-day city hall building was purchased for $17,000. Spaulding initiated the move to bring the county seat from San Leandro to Oakland, which was finally approved by the state legislature in 1874, with the county accepting Franklin and Washington Squares as sites for a new Courthouse and Hall of Records. He donated 100% of his salary to charity while he was mayor. He also served for four years as Assistant United States Treasurer of San Francisco following his appointment by President James A. Garfield in 1881. He served from May, 1881 to August, 1885.

As a member of the Republican party, he served as an alternate delegate to the Republican National Convention from California in 1888. Leland Stanford selected him as one of the trustees of Stanford University. He later stepped down to make room for Jane Lathrop Stanford to become a trustee. He was also a director of the Industrial Home for the Adult Blind on Telegraph Avenue, and Thirty-sixth Street.

Spaulding was a high-ranking Mason and reached the rank of a 33rd-degree Mason. He became a member of the organisation in 1855. He served as the grand high priest of the Alameda Chapter of the Royal Arch Masons, attaining the rank of grand high priest of California. He was founder and first master of the Free & Accepted Masons Oakland Lodge #188 and was elected six times as treasurer. He was close friends with his fellow Masons Enoch H. Pardee and his son George Pardee.

== Personal life and death ==
On May 25, 1854, he married Mary Theresa Clinkenbeard (February 26, 1838 – August 13, 1904) in Campo Seco, California, the daughter of William Clinkenbeard of Kentucky. Nathan and Mary had had 10 children, but 3 died in infancy and only 6 outlived them.

Spaulding died of malarial fever in New Britain, Connecticut on October 8, 1903. He was buried in Mountain View Cemetery (Oakland, California).

Political offices
Preceded by John B. Felton	Mayor of Oakland, California; 1869—1870	Succeeded by Henry Durant
