= Boronda =

Boronda is a Spanish name and may refer to:

- Boronda, California, U.S., unincorporated community and census-designated place (CDP)
- Boronda Meadows, school in the Salinas City Elementary School District
- Carmel Valley Road-Boronda Road Eucalyptus Tree Row in Carmel Valley, California, U.S.

== Buildings ==
- Boronda Adobe History Center in Salinas, California
- Jose Eusebio Boronda Adobe in Salinas, California, U.S.

== People with the name Boronda ==
- Beonne Boronda (1911–2012), American sculptor, educator
- Bertha Boronda (1877–1950), American criminal
- Lester D. Boronda (1886–1953), American painter, sculptor, and furniture designer

== See also ==
- Holman Ranch
- Rancho Potrero de San Luis Obispo
- Rancho Rincón del Sanjón
