= Katie Ohe =

Canadian sculptor

Katie Ohe AOE RCA
- Born: Katherine Dorothea Minna von der Ohe; 1937 (age 88–89) near Peers, Alberta
- Education: Alberta College of Art and Design, Montreal School of Art and Design, Alberta College of Art and Design, SculptureCenter
- Known for: kinetic sculptor
- Spouse: Harry Kiyooka (m. 1968)
- Awards: Alberta Order of Excellence; 2019; Queen Elizabeth II Golden Jubilee Medal; 2002; Queen Elizabeth II Diamond Jubilee Medal; 2012

Katie Ohe, AOE RCA LL. D. (born Katherine Dorothea Minna von der Ohe) in 1937, is a sculptor living in Calgary, Alberta. Ohe is known as one of the first artists to make abstract sculpture in Alberta, and has been influential as a teacher at the Alberta College of Art and Design. She is best known for her abstract and kinetic sculptures.

== Biography ==
Born near Peers, Alberta, Ohe began her studies at the Alberta College of Art and Design in Calgary (then the Provincial Institute of Technology and Art) 1954 to 1957 under the guidance of pioneer modernist artist Marion Nicoll.

Other influential instructors were Illingworth Kerr, Stan Blodgett, Ken Sturdy and ceramist Luke Lindoe. Lindoe invited her to work at Ceramics Arts in the summer of 1957, where she worked alongside Walter Dexter, Walt Drohan, Luke Lindoe and Pat Banks (Drohan). She was awarded a National Gallery Study Award to study child art education with Arthur Lismer at the Montreal School of Art and Design, Montreal Museum of Fine Arts 1957 to 1958. While in Montreal, she was impressed by an exhibition of the planar work of Anne Kahane. On her return to Calgary, she rented a property in the grounds of the famous Hart family house and taught in the child art program modeled on that of Lismer at the Coste House, Calgary, where Archie Key was managing director. She returned to the Art Department of the Provincial Institute of Technology and Art (now the Alberta College of Art and Design) to complete her fourth year and earn her diploma in 1960.

With a Green Shield Scholarship secured through the support of Marion Nicoll, and the recommendation of Archie Key, she went to New York City to pursue post-graduate studies for three years at the Sculpture Center where Dorothea Henrietta Denslow was director. While there, she worked alongside sculptor Sahl Swarz, who later invited her to Verona, Italy where she spent several summers working at the Bronze Foundry.

Ohe married artist Harry Kiyooka in 1968. In 2011, the couple founded the Kiyooka Ohe Art Centre in Calgary, to promote contemporary art. Harry Kiyooka died in 2022.

== Teaching ==
Ohe taught drawing, ceramics and sculpture to adults and children at Coste House 1960–1962, and 1964–67. She taught at the Alberta College of Art and Design (1960–1962) and 1970 until her retirement from teaching in 2016. She was sessional sculpture instructor at Mount Royal College 1970–1982, sculpture instructor at the University of Calgary (1978–1979), and seminar instructor at the Banff Centre, 1978–1979. Her many students include notable artists Evan Penny, Christian Eckart, Brian Cooley, Alexander Caldwell and Isla Burns.

== Selected public sculpture ==
Ohe's public-art commissions include:

- Three Tree (2024).Two Park Central, Calgary
- Janet's Crown. (2001) AUArts, Calgary
- Nimmons Cairn. Bankview's Nimmons Park, Calgary
- Garden of Learning. University of Calgary
- Zipper. (1975). University of Calgary, Calgary
- Cracked Pot Foundations. Prince's Island Park, Calgary

== Selected exhibitions ==
- 2020. Katie Ohe. Esker Foundation, Calgary, AB
- 2019. MONSOON, Robin Arseneault, Isla Burns, Christian Eckhart, Katie Ohe and Evan Penny. Griffin Art Projects, North Vancouver, BC
- 2006. Monsoon: Katie Ohe. Art Gallery of Calgary, AB
- 1991. Katie Ohe. The Illingworth Kerr Gallery, Alberta University of the Arts, Calgary, AB

== Awards ==
In 1991, Ohe received the ACAD Alumni Award of Excellence Award (formerly the Board of Governors’ Award of Excellence). She received an honorary doctorate from the University of Calgary in recognition of her pioneering influence on art in Alberta in 2001. She was awarded the Queen Elizabeth II Golden Jubilee Medal in 2002, the Alberta Centennial Medal in 2006, and the Queen Elizabeth II Diamond Jubilee Medal in 2012. She was made a member of the Royal Canadian Academy of Arts. In 2019, she was inducted into the Alberta Order of Excellence.
