= Zoë Lund =

American performer and writer (1962–1999)

Zoë Tamerlis Lund
- Lund in 1993
- Born: Zoë Tamerlis; February 9, 1962; New York City, New York, U.S.
- Died: April 16, 1999 (aged 37); Paris, France
- Other names: Zoë Tamerlaine; Vanessa Lancaster; Tamara Tamarind
- Occupations: Musician; model; actress; screenwriter
- Years active: 1979–1999
- Spouse: Robert Lund (m. 1986)
- Partner: Edouard de Laurot (1979–1986)
- Parents: Victor Tamerlis (father); Barbara Lekberg (mother)
- Website: zoelund.com

Zoë Lund (née Tamerlis; February 9, 1962 – April 16, 1999), also known as Zoë Tamerlaine, was an American musician, model, actress, author, producer, political activist, and screenwriter. She was best known for her association in two films with film director Abel Ferrara: Ms .45 (1981), in which she starred, and Bad Lieutenant (1992), for which she co-wrote the screenplay.

== Early life ==
Lund was born Zoë Tamerlis in New York City on February 9, 1962, the only child of Barbara Lekberg (née Hult), an American sculptor originally from Portland, Oregon, and Victor Tamerlis, a rare-books seller. Her mother was of Swedish descent and her father was of Romanian descent. She enrolled in Mount Holyoke College but left after one year.

== Career ==
At a young age, Lund was an accomplished composer and musician; but the power of celluloid took a firmer grasp. "I could write a concerto with 17 violins that could be very powerful, but film works on a more visceral level where I can go into the collective audience and make sure my point gets across." Lund was also a pianist.

=== Ms .45 ===
Lund made her debut in Abel Ferrara's Ms .45 (1981). She was only 17 years old during the making of the film.

Lund said in an interview that she had a lot of input manifesting the character: "In the beginning stages of the film, the only material that existed was vague descriptions of several scenes. Being that my face is on camera, without dialogue, for something like 98% of the time, I was involved very much. As to the film being pro-woman, I go beyond that by saying that the film is as much pro-woman as it is pro-garment worker, whatever."

Although it was not an immediate success, Ms .45 eventually became a cult film in later years.

=== 1980s work ===
Not wanting to become part of what she called "Abel's stable", she marked her own career path.

Three years after Ms .45 was released in 1981, Lund got her second chance to star in a movie, this time playing a double role in Special Effects, written and directed by Larry Cohen. Lund plays a wannabe starlet who is murdered on film by a fallen director portrayed by Eric Bogosian, who then finds a lookalike (also Lund) to take her place in the movie he decides to make around the snuff footage. As the starlet, Lund's voice was dubbed by another actress, meaning it wasn't until an hour into her second movie that audiences finally got to hear her distinctly New Yorker inflections (Lund's character in Ms .45 was mute).

Lund also appeared in an episode of Miami Vice, which was directed by Paul Michael Glaser and titled "Prodigal Son". She later appeared in The Houseguest (1989) and Temístocles López's Exquisite Corpses (1989). Lund later appeared in the ABC series Hothouse.

=== Bad Lieutenant ===
Despite her reluctance to be identified too closely with Ferrara's work, Lund collaborated with Ferrara again on Bad Lieutenant (1992), which she co-wrote. Lund also agreed to appear in the film, playing the woman who helps Harvey Keitel's title character first smoke, then shoot heroin.

According to Lund, "There was a lot of rewriting done on the set. Two other characters were cut, and my character modulated and took on more and more. A lot of things had to be changed and improvised. The vampire speech – which is crucial to the Lieutenant – was written two minutes before it was shot. I memorized it and did it in one take. The speech is important because she is acute in knowing the journey the Lieutenant makes. She shoots him up, sends him off, knowing of his passion, she lets him go."

Lund said in an interview that Bad Lieutenant was the most personal film she had ever acted in. She also claims in another interview that she wrote the screenplay all by herself. She also claimed that she co-directed several scenes in Bad Lieutenant.

=== Later career ===
As a director, Lund made two shorts: The Innocent Tribunal (1986) and Hot Ticket (1996). She also wrote the pilot episode of FBI: The Untold Stories.

Lund worked on unproduced screenplays about famous drug addicts such as John Holmes and Gia Carangi. Lund attempted to publish several novels, including Curfew: USA and 490: A Trilogy and Kingdom for a Horse. A film adaptation of Curfew: USA and the screenplay about Holmes were both projects that Ferrara had considered filming. Other unproduced screenplays that have been credited as Lund's works included Last Night of Summer and Free Will and Testament.

Although she had never met supermodel Gia Carangi, she was working on a biographical screenplay of Carangi's life at the time of her death, and she appeared posthumously in the documentary The Self-Destruction of Gia.

According to Abel Ferrara: "...one time in the ‘90s, we were going to try to do Pasolini's story but only with Zoe as Pasolini, a female director living the life that Pasolini lived." However, her death led to a fifteen-year hiatus with the project until Ferrara's film Pasolini (2014) was released. In 1996, Lund also wrote the first draft of Abel Ferrara’s New Rose Hotel (1998), based on William Gibson's 1984 short story of the same name.

== Personal life and death ==
=== Aliases ===
Lund lived and worked under many names such as Vanessa Lancaster and Tamara Tamarind.

=== Drug addiction ===
Lund was unapologetic about her heroin addiction. She wrote at length about heroin and advocated for legalizing recreational use in the United States; she also romanticized its effects. "She loved heroin, she was killed by heroin," Ferrara said on her addiction. "...Zoë was one of these people who thought heroin was the greatest thing in the world, and she did until the day she died. She was down on coke, down on everything, but you know, heroin was the elixir of life for her."

"I've known a lot of serious drug users, but Zoë was Queen," Richard Hell, a friend of Lund's, recalled in 2002. "You've got to admire someone as committed to it as she was. She didn't just LOVE heroin, she believed in it."

=== Religion ===
Lund said in an interview, "...I never lost my religion. I have always had a certain increasing awareness of religion...I do believe that the Gospel is the ultimate story. What is amazing about the book is that over the millennia, the gospel has become so refined to the point where the Christ story does present a very refined and highly charged model for the search for truth. We can use the book as a basis for our own path to spirituality and grace."

=== Relationships ===
From 1979 to 1986, she was the companion of Edouard de Laurot. After Laurot's death in 1993, Lund bequeathed the manuscript of a novel Laurot had written to Jonas Mekas.

In 1986, she started dating her future husband, Robert Lund. They lived together in an apartment located on 10th Street, and according to Paul Rachman, the Lunds reportedly owned "dozens of roaming pet rats." The couple were married on October 31, 1986, at the NYC Municipal Building with one witness in attendance, their friend Lenny Ferrari. That same year, Lund got an abortion.

Although they never got divorced, Lund and her husband separated in 1997, when Lund moved to Paris where she lived with "her new boyfriend" until her death in 1999.

=== Death ===
Lund died in Paris on April 16, 1999, of heart failure, due to extended cocaine use, which replaced her long-term heroin use after her move to Paris in 1997. She was 37.

== Legacy ==
In 2007, experimental group Bodega System released the album Blood Pyx. The cover features Lund as photographed by her widower, Robert Lund.

In the early 2000s, American Hardcore director Paul Rachman made two documentary shorts about Lund's life: Zoe XO (2004) and Zoe Rising (2009). In the former short, Robert Lund discusses their relationship, while in the latter Zoë's mother Barbara Lekberg focuses more on her childhood.

Abel Ferrara said of Lund in a 2012 interview, "Zoë was a brilliant, creative person before the drugs; the drugs just killed her."

== Filmography ==
Film
Year	Title	Role	Notes
1981	Ms. 45	Thana	Credited as Zoë Tamerlis
1984	Special Effects	Andrea Wilcox / Elaine	Credited as Zoe Tamerlis
1984	Terror in the Aisles	Thana	Archival footage
1989	Exquisite Corpses	Belinda Maloney	Credited as Zoë Tamerlis
1989	Heavy Petting	Herself	Credited as Zoe Tamerlaine
1989	The Houseguest	Marla	Credited as Zoe Tamerlaine
1992	Bad Lieutenant	Zoe	Writer
1993	Hot Ticket		Director, writer, actress
1994	Dreamland	Caroline	(final film role)
Television
Year	Title	Role	Notes
1985	Miami Vice	Miranda	1 episode
1988	Hothouse	Chickie	7 episodes

== Bibliography ==
- Poems (2023) (poetry), 16 pages, bilingual, co-published by Éditions Lutanie (Paris) and Small Press (New York).
