= Dorothea H. Denslow =

American sculptor, educator (1900–1971)

Dorothea Henrietta Denslow
- Born: December 14, 1900; New York City, United States
- Died: April 26, 1971 (aged 70); East Stroudsburg, Pennsylvania, United States
- Burial place: Moravian Cemetery
- Other names: Miss Dee
- Education: Art Students League of New York
- Occupation(s): Sculptor, educator

Dorothea "Miss Dee" Henrietta Denslow (December 14, 1900 – April 26, 1971) was an American sculptor, and educator. She was the founder of the Clay Club (later known as the SculptureCenter) in New York City.

== Biography ==
Dorothea Henrietta Denslow was born on December 14, 1900, in New York City, to parents Cornelia Julia (née Smith) and Henry Carey Denslow. Her father was a bird taxidermist, and painter who worked as a natural history curator at the Brooklyn Children's Museum, and she art studied under him. At age fourteen she started exhibiting her artwork. She was partly raised in Hartford, Connecticut, and in 1923, she was a member of the Connecticut Academy Fine Arts.

Denslow attended the Art Students League of New York.

In 1928, Denslow founded the Clay Club (later known as the SculptureCenter), which was her studio and it was also used as a meeting space and young artists workshop founded at 184^{1/2} Brooklyn Ave. in Brooklyn, initially in the basement of the Brooklyn Children's Museum. She often taught sculpture to teenagers. Her former students, and Clay Club-affiliated artists included Elsa Hutzler, Muriel Kelsey, George Gerny, Howard Mandel, Nina Winkel, Yvonne Forrest, Beonne Boronda, Sahl Swarz, Louise Nevelson, Frank Eliscu, Harry Holtzman, and Ibram Lassaw. In 1932, the Clay Club was moved to the West Village. Denslow also taught classes at the Art Students League of New York.

At the time of her retirement in 1962, the Clay Club had some seventy-two cats living there. Towards the end of her life she lived in Mountainhome, Pennsylvania. Denslow died at the age of 70 on April 26, 1971, in a hospital in East Stroudsburg, Pennsylvania.
