= Boronda, California =

- Unincorporated Community; Census Designated Place
- Location in Monterey County and the state of California

- Location in the United States
- Coordinates: 36°41′56″N 121°40′30″W
- Country: United States
- State: California
- County: Monterey

Government
  - State senator: John Laird (D)
  - Assemblymember: Robert Rivas (D)
  - U. S. rep.: Zoe Lofgren (D)

Area
  - Total: 0.57 sq mi (1.5 km^{2})
  - Land: 0.57 sq mi (1.5 km^{2})
  - Water: 0.00 sq mi (0 km^{2}) 0%
- Elevation: 62 ft (19 m)

Population (2020)
  - Total: 1,760
  - Density: 3,066.2/sq mi (1,183.9/km^{2})
- Time zone: UTC-8 (PST)
  - Summer (DST): UTC-7 (PDT)
- ZIP code: 93907 (Salinas)
- Area code: 831
- FIPS code: 06-07578
- GNIS feature ID: 1853377

Boronda is an unincorporated community and census-designated place (CDP) in Monterey County, California, United States. The population was 1,760 at the 2020 census. Boronda is located directly west of Salinas and is named after José Eusebio Boronda y Higuera, a Californio ranchero, and located on the lands of his Rancho Rincón del Sanjón.

== Geography ==
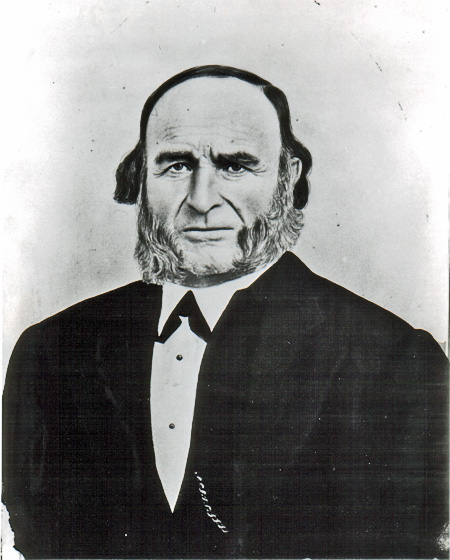
Boronda is named after José Eusebio Boronda y Higuera, a Californio ranchero and located on the lands of his Rancho Rincón del Sanjón.

Boronda is located in northern Monterey County at 36°41′56″N 121°40′30″W, in the Salinas Valley. It is bordered to the east by the city of Salinas, the Monterey county seat.

According to the United States Census Bureau, the CDP has a total area of 0.57 square miles (1.5 km^{2}), all land.

== Demographics ==
Historical population
Census	Pop.	Note	%±
2000	1,325		—
2010	1,710		29.1%
2020	1,760		2.9%
U.S. Decennial Census; 1850–1870 1880-1890; 1900 1910 1920; 1930 1940 1950; 1960 1970 1980; 1990 2000 2010

Boronda first appeared as a census designated place in the 2000 U.S. census.

=== 2020 census ===
As of the 2020 census, Boronda had a population of 1,760 and a population density of 3,066.2 inhabitants per square mile (1,183.9/km^{2}). The median age was 33.1 years; 27.0% of residents were under age 18 and 7.8% were age 65 or older. For every 100 females, there were 111.0 males, and for every 100 females age 18 and over there were 109.3 males age 18 and over.

The census reported that 1,748 people (99.3% of the population) lived in households, 12 (0.7%) lived in non-institutionalized group quarters, and no one was institutionalized. 100.0% of residents lived in urban areas, while 0.0% lived in rural areas.

There were 410 households, of which 53.9% had children under age 18. Of all households, 54.6% were married-couple households, 6.6% were cohabiting couple households, 23.2% had a female householder with no partner present, and 15.6% had a male householder with no partner present. About 5.1% of households were one-person households, and 6 households had one person aged 65 or older. The average household size was 4.26. There were 360 families (87.8% of all households).

There were 481 housing units at an average density of 838.0 units per square mile (323.6 units/km^{2}), of which 410 (85.2%) were occupied. Of occupied units, 210 (51.2%) were owner-occupied and 200 (48.8%) were renter-occupied. The homeowner vacancy rate was 0.0% and the rental vacancy rate was 2.0%.

Racial composition as of the 2020 census
Race	Number	Percent
White	243	13.8%
Black or African American	18	1.0%
American Indian and Alaska Native	68	3.9%
Asian	57	3.2%
Native Hawaiian and Other Pacific Islander	14	0.8%
Some other race	896	50.9%
Two or more races	464	26.4%
Hispanic or Latino (of any race)	1,532	87.0%

=== Income and poverty ===
In 2023, the US Census Bureau estimated that the median household income was $77,639, and the per capita income was $21,922. About 7.0% of families and 7.2% of the population were below the poverty line.

=== 2010 census ===
The 2010 United States census reported that Boronda had a population of 1,710. The population density was 3,106.5 inhabitants per square mile (1,199.4/km^{2}). The racial makeup of Boronda was 661 (38.7%) White, 10 (0.6%) African American, 26 (1.5%) Native American, 116 (6.8%) Asian, 7 (0.4%) Pacific Islander, 774 (45.3%) from other races, and 116 (6.8%) from two or more races. Hispanic or Latino of any race were 1,457 persons (85.2%).

The Census reported that 1,710 people (100% of the population) lived in households, 0 (0%) lived in non-institutionalized group quarters, and 0 (0%) were institutionalized.

There were 394 households, out of which 237 (60.2%) had children under the age of 18 living in them, 227 (57.6%) were opposite-sex married couples living together, 83 (21.1%) had a female householder with no husband present, 30 (7.6%) had a male householder with no wife present. There were 29 (7.4%) unmarried opposite-sex partnerships, and 2 (0.5%) same-sex married couples or partnerships. 41 households (10.4%) were made up of individuals, and 15 (3.8%) had someone living alone who was 65 years of age or older. The average household size was 4.34. There were 340 families (86.3% of all households); the average family size was 4.52.

The population was spread out, with 558 people (32.6%) under the age of 18, 224 people (13.1%) aged 18 to 24, 476 people (27.8%) aged 25 to 44, 334 people (19.5%) aged 45 to 64, and 118 people (6.9%) who were 65 years of age or older. The median age was 27.2 years. For every 100 females, there were 102.4 males. For every 100 females age 18 and over, there were 102.1 males.

There were 413 housing units at an average density of 750.3 per square mile (289.7/km^{2}), of which 183 (46.4%) were owner-occupied, and 211 (53.6%) were occupied by renters. The homeowner vacancy rate was 4.7%; the rental vacancy rate was 3.2%. 778 people (45.5% of the population) lived in owner-occupied housing units and 932 people (54.5%) lived in rental housing units.

== Schools ==
Boronda currently has two active schools, Boronda Meadows Elementary and Boronda DIA. Boronda Meadows Elementary is part of the Salinas City Elementary School District and was opened in 2005. During the 2005–2006 school year, Boronda Meadows enrolled 571 students in grades K-6. Enrollment for the 2016–17 school year is approximately 730. Boronda School, 1114 Fontes Lane, was closed at the end of the 2005 school year. Many of the students and staff were transferred to Boronda Meadows. The old Boronda school housed the Monterey County Office of Education's Community Day School from 2007 - 2015. The Salinas City Elementary School District reopened Boronda School in the fall of 2015 as a dual immersion language magnet school. It has been renamed "Dual Immersion Academy Salinas" or DIAS- Boronda and for the 2016–17 school year has approximately 100 students enrolled.

== See also ==
- Lester D. Boronda (1886–1953), painter, furniture designer; and great-grandson of José Eusebio Boronda y Higuera
