= Special Effects (film) =

- Theatrical release poster
- Directed by: Larry Cohen
- Written by: Larry Cohen
- Produced by: Paul Kurta
- Starring: Zoë Lund; Eric Bogosian
- Cinematography: Paul Glickman
- Edited by: Armond Lebowitz
- Music by: Michael Minard
- Production companies: Hemdale Film Corporation; Larco Productions
- Distributed by: New Line Cinema
- Release date: November 30, 1984 (Minneapolis)
- Running time: 106 minutes
- Country: United States
- Language: English

Special Effects is a 1984 American psychological horror film written and directed by Larry Cohen and starring Zoë Lund and Eric Bogosian. Its plot follows a New York City woman who is cast in a film by a struggling director based on a murder he committed and captured on film.

Cohen based Special Effects on a screenplay he wrote in 1967 titled The Cutting Room. The film was shot on location in New York City in early 1984. The film received a limited theatrical release in Minneapolis, Minnesota on November 30, 1984 through New Line Cinema before being released to home video in 1985. It was later screened as part of a retrospective on Cohen's films at The Public Theater in New York City in 1986.

The film has been noted by some film scholars for its self-reflexive elements and references to the works of Alfred Hitchcock, particularly Juno and the Paycock (1930) and Vertigo (1958).

== Plot ==
Andrea Wilcox is an aspiring actress from Dallas, Texas who has run away from her husband, Keefe, and their toddler son. Keefe tracks her down in New York City, where he finds her at a nude modeling shoot. He chases her into the street, forcing her into his car. They arrive at her apartment where he shows her film footage of their son. Andrea escapes the interrogation, fleeing to the home of Christopher Neville, a film director who has promised her a role in his upcoming picture. Neville is a disgruntled filmmaker who has recently returned to New York from Los Angeles after his last film was cancelled over budgetary disputes. Neville and Andrea are about to have a sexual encounter, but they get into an argument and he strangles her to death; her murder is caught entirely on camera from a camera he has hidden in the room.

After Andrea's body is found in Coney Island, police immediately suspect Keefe of her murder and he is arrested. Neville, however, ingratiates himself with Keefe by buying him an attorney and earning him his freedom; Neville claims to have witnessed Keefe's arrest on the street and become fascinated by his and Andrea's stories. Neville tells Keefe he wants his next film to be based on Andrea's life. Keefe, initially reluctant, agrees to help Neville as a technical advisor. At a local Salvation Army, Keefe meets Elaine Bernstein, a directionless woman who bears an uncanny resemblance to Andrea. He brings her to meet Neville, who casts her in the film as Andrea. Neville brutally strangles Leon Gruskin, a snarky film lab assistant, to death before having dinner with Elaine to solidify her contract.

During the film shoot, Keefe becomes upset when the actor portraying him reveals he had sex with the real Andrea, and assaults him. Later, Elaine visits Keefe, and the two end up having sex. Neville ultimately decides to fire the actor and cast Keefe in the film, playing himself. At the end of the shoot, Keefe uncovers Neville's film reel containing Andrea's murder. Keefe attempts to view the footage with Elaine, but is prevented by doing so when Neville arrives, and he damages the negatives in the process.

Neville shows to Det. Delroy a recently shot love scene between Keefe and Elaine, willingly pointing out a spousicide-related detail which compromises the already delicate position of the young widower. In light of this new evidence, Delroy tells the director that he will arrest the young man very soon. Neville telephones Keefe to warn him, telling him to come to his house at a certain time. The director also calls Elaine to his home, where he attempts to recreate the night of Andrea's murder, this time using Elaine. Det. Vickers watches Elaine enter the director's house from the street, but he misses Keefe, who breaks in through a window. He disrupts the liaison by pulling plug fuses out of the breaker box, shutting off the lights. Detective Vickers notices the lights shut off from the street and unsuccessfully tries to break in. In the house, Neville attacks Keefe with a pair of scissors, and the two struggle. Keefe throws Neville over a balcony, and he lands in an indoor fountain below together with a light. Simultaneously, Elaine restores electricity to the house, unknowingly electrocuting Neville to death.

Shortly after, Keefe and Elaine arrive at the airport to board a plane to Dallas. There, Elaine plans to assume Andrea's identity for the sake of Keefe and Andrea's son, and start a new life.

== Cast ==
- Zoë Lund as Andrea Wilcox / Elaine Bernstein
- Eric Bogosian as Christopher Neville
- Brad Rijn as Keefe Waterman
- Kevin O'Connor as Det. Lt. Phillip Delroy
- Bill Oland as Det. Vickers
- H. Richard Greene as Leon Gruskin
- Steven Pudenz as Wiesanthal

== Themes ==
Film scholars Xavier Mendik and Stephen Jay Schneider noted the self-reflexivity present in the film: "Special Effects is particularly significant in terms of its use of self-reflexive techniques usually associated exclusively with underground cinema. It continues Cohen's interrogation and extension of motifs contained within the films of Alfred Hitchcock, but they are here mediated within the mode of the former's cherished 'guerrilla cinema'." They also added that the film is "particularly instructive in showing how low-budget underground film using a narrative structure can interrogate the negative effects of the male gaze and, at the same time, deliver a form of visual pleasure that is not compromised by the dominant ideology." They also likened elements of the film to Hitchcock's Juno and the Paycock (1930) and Vertigo (1958).

== Production ==
The screenplay was based on a script titled The Cutting Room that Cohen had written circa 1967. At the time, Cohen had been interested in optioning his screenplay for Daddy's Gone A-Hunting (1969) to Alfred Hitchcock, but instead Universal Studios hired Mark Robson to direct the film.

Filming took place in 1984 New York City. Cohen recalled of shooting the film that stars Lund, Bogosian, and Rijn were "all highly offbeat people who lived in strange basements, had no money, and were highly talented." Commenting on the film in a retrospective interview, Cohen said:

It's my revenge on big budget directors. Eric Bogosian is a director who's washed-up, he's had a couple of flops, he can't get a job any more. But he's got a beautiful house down in the Greenwich Village area, which was a great location to shoot in. He has committed a murder, and photographed it, and now he tries to integrate it into a movie. Eric was actually very nice. We had a fight the first day. [I] always have a fight the first day, with somebody. But as soon as you have the fight, and you establish who's in charge, they never bother you again after that.

For Neville's loft, which features an indoor poor and stained glass windows of flowers, the filmmakers used Lowell Nesbitt's Soho studio, a building so unusual that it received coverage in the New York Times, Vogue, and Architectural Digest.

== Release ==
In Larry Cohen: The Radical Allegories of an Independent Filmmaker, scholar Tony Williams notes that the film "never got proper theatrical distribution and went straight to video." The film did, however, have a regional theatrical release through New Line Cinema, opening in Minneapolis on November 30, 1984. The film later screened as part of a series of Cohen's films in August 1986 at The Public Theater in New York City.

=== Home media ===
Special Effects was released on VHS by Embassy Home Entertainment in 1985. It was issued on DVD by Metro-Goldwyn-Mayer Home Entertainment on June 1, 2004. Olive Films released the film on Blu-ray on October 18, 2016.

== Reception ==
Walter Goodman of The New York Times wrote: "Coherence is not the strong point here. To judge by the lines delivered by the murderous director, Mr. Cohen apparently thought he was issuing a statement about reality and imagination." The New York Daily News praised the film as a "consistently clever thriller" with a "reality-vs.-the-media-mirror theme." TV Guide awarded the film three out of five stars, referring to it as a "strange and interesting" film. Time Out wrote in their review: "After a shaky start, the twists of the plot begin to take hold, and there's even a serious angle."

Donald Guarisco of AllMovie wrote of the film:

[Special Effects is] an example of writer/director Larry Cohen at his most conceptually audacious. His script for this film touches on Hollywood egotism, the cruelty of showbiz, snuff films, the corrupting allure that moviemaking holds for neophytes and even works in a few allusions to Hitchcock ... He grounds his unusual script with a low-key directorial approach that achieves some fine setpieces: the showiest moments are the murder that kicks off the plot and the loft-set finale but the most effective might be a silent, desolate moment where a dead body is abandoned in an isolated, snow-covered Coney Island parking lot.

== Sources ==
- Mendik, Xavier; Schneider, Steven Jay (2003). Underground U.S.A.: Filmmaking Beyond the Hollywood Canon. New York: Columbia University Press. ISBN 978-0-231-85002-5.
- Mitchell, Steve; Cohen, Larry (2016). Special Effects (Blu-ray audio commentary). Olive Films.
- Williams, Tony (2014). Larry Cohen: The Radical Allegories of an Independent Filmmaker (Revised ed.). Jefferson, North Carolina: McFarland. ISBN 978-0-786-47969-6.
