= Katrín Sigurdardóttir =

Icelandic sculptor (born 1967)

- Born: 1967; Reykjavík

Katrín Sigurdardóttir (born 1967 in Reykjavík, Iceland) is a New York-based artist who works in installation and sculpture. Katrin studied at the Icelandic College of Arts and Crafts, Reykjavík and received a BFA from the San Francisco Art Institute and her MFA from the Mason Gross School of the Arts, Rutgers University. She creates complex structures built to be viewed in exhibition settings but not used as functional architecture. Conceptually, her work reflects issues of intimacy and memory in built spaces, historical recreations, and disorienting shifts in scale. Her work has appeared at the 2013 Icelandic Pavilion of the 55th Venice Biennale, the 33rd São Paulo Bienal, in 2018, The Metropolitan Museum of Art, Sculpture Center, and PS1 Contemporary Art Center.

== Career ==
Katrín grew up in Reykjavík in a two-story rowhouse built by her family. She came to the US to study at the San Francisco Institute of Art, from which she received a BFA, and then later settled in New York City. She holds a unique position among Icelandic artists, particularly in terms of her diverse sculptures and installations that are based on a strong conceptual foundation.”

Her piece "Foundation" featured prominently in Iceland's pavilion at the Venice Biennale. It has since been exhibited at many venues, including New York's SculptureCenter. Karen Rosenberg, in the New York Times, writes, "With 'Foundation,' Ms. Sigurdardottir is also moving deeper into the decorative arts — abandoning the all-white set pieces exemplified by her 2010 set of installations in the Metropolitan Museum’s period rooms. Instead of building ghostly models that riff on existing architecture, she is making something that looks historically authentic (at least to the casual observer) and is steeped in artisanal labor."

== Awards and Fellowships ==
- 2016 The Harker Award for Interdisciplinary Studies
- 2015 Creative Capital Award
- 2013 The Richard Serra Prize, National Gallery of Art, Reykjavík
- 2011 Ateliers des Arques, Les Arques, France. Artist Residency
- 2007 The Icelandic Department of Culture: National Artist Fellowship (´12, ‘07, ‘05, ‘02, ‘00 and ‘97)
- 2005 The Louis Comfort Tiffany Biennial Award
- The Rema Hort Foundation Grant, New York
- 2004-3 Lower Manhattan Culture Council, Woolworth Building Residency, New York
- 2003 Art OMI International Artists Colony, Ghent, New York
- 2002 Carnegie Art Award - Finalist
- 2001 Nordic Committee on Art and Design: Residency at NACD, Norway (‘07 and ‘99)
- 2000 The Gudmunda Kristinsdóttir Memorial Award, Reykjavik Museum of Art
- The Nordic Institute for Contemporary Art: NIFCA Residency, Riga, Latvia
