= Catalina Ouyang =

21st-century American artist

Cato Ouyang (formerly known as Catalina Ouyang)
- Education: Yale University
- Known for: Sculpture, installation art
- Awards: Hermitage Artist Retreat, 2026 Residency Unlimited, NYC-Based Artist Residency, 2025 Fountainhead Residency, Miami FL, 2024 Cafe Royal Cultural Foundation Grant, 2024 Stone & Deguire Award, 2023 Vermont Studio Center, 2022 Artist in Residence, Smack Mellon, Brooklyn, NY, 2020-2021 Foundation for Contemporary Arts Emergency Grant, 2020 Santo Foundation Individual Artist Award, 2019 Puffin Foundation Grant, 2019 Artist in Residence, Shandaken: Storm King, New Windsor, NY, 2019 Real Art Award, Real Art Ways, Hartford, CT, 2019 Artist in Residence, Mary Sky, Hancock, Vermont, 2017 Artist in Residence, Atlantic Center for the Arts, New Smyrna Beach, FL, 2016 Artist in Residence, OBRAS Foundation, Evora Monte, Portugal, 2016 Oklahoma Visual Arts Coalition FOCUS selected artist honorarium, 2016 NARS Foundation Residency & Fellow, Brooklyn, 2015 Elizabeth Greenshields Grant, 2011
- Patrons: PERMANENT COLLECTIONS Brooklyn Museum, Los Angeles County Museum of Art, Cantor Arts Center, Columbus Museum of Art, Faurschou Foundation, High Art Museum, Kadist Foundation, Museum of Fine Arts Boston, Nasher Sculpture Center, Perez Art Museum, Pond Society, X Museum
- Website: https://cato-ouyang.org

Cato Ouyang is an American sculptor and installation artist who lives and works in New York City.

== Career ==
Ouyang's sculptures often incorporate atypical materials, from horse tibias and cigarette butts to a replica of a trench toilet in its entirety. The disparate objects explore trauma, memory, and the corporeal.

Ouyang has cited Anne Carson, Anne Sexton, Marguerite Duras, Marisa Merz, and Louise Bourgeois as inspirations for their work.

=== Notable exhibitions ===
Ouyang had a solo exhibition, organized by Alexis Wilkinson, at the Knockdown Center in New York in 2020. This included recent sculptures by Ouyang as well as a video installation presenting text transcribed from the artist's project "Conclusion and Findings," in which Ouyang invited artists and writers to respond to a legal document.

In 2021 Ouyang had a solo exhibition titled The Siren at Real Art Ways in Hartford, CT.

SculptureCenter included Ouyang in its 2021 iteration of the annual InPractice exhibition, You may go, but this will bring you back curated by Katherine Simóne Reynolds. In 2022, at No Place Gallery in Columbus, Ohio, Ouyang put on their exhibition, Three Betrayals. Also in 2022,Ouyang's art was exhibited at the Aldrich Museum as part of 52 Artists: A Feminist Milestone.

Ouyang produced three solo exhibitions for the Lyles and King gallery in Manhattan: cunt waifu in 2020; White Male Ally in 2021; and Trick" in 2024 which was named by Franklin Sirmans in Art Forum as one of the 10 best exhibitions (public and private) of the year.

Works by Ouyang were featured prominently in two major public museum exhibitions in 2026: New Humans: Memories of the Future which debuted the reopening of the New Museum and Subvert, Repair, Reclaim: Contemporary Artists Take Back the Nude at the Boston Museum of Fine Arts.

Ouyang has a scheduled solo exhibition scheduled for the winter of 2027 at Night Gallery in Los Angeles where they previously put on the exhibition forgive everything in 2022.

=== Academic Reception ===
An examination of Ouyang's work forms an significant part of the monograph Spoiled: Asian American Hostility and the Damage of Repair, by Summer Kim Lee. Published by Duke University Press in 2025.

=== Awards and residencies ===
Ouyang was a Smack Mellon Artist in Residence in Brooklyn, NY from 2020 to 2021. They have also attended residencies at the NARS Foundation in Brooklyn in 2015, OBRAS Foundation in Evora Monte, Portugal in 2016, Atlantic Center for the Arts in New Smyrna Beach, FL in 2016, Mary Sky in Hancock, Vermont in 2017, Shandaken: Storm King in New Windsor, NY in 2019, and the Vermont Studio Center in 2022.

Ouyang has received awards such as the CURA Prize in 2015, Oklahoma Visual Arts Coalition FOCUS selected artist honorarium in 2016, the Emergency Grant from the Foundation for Contemporary Arts in 2020, the Santo Foundation Individual Artist Award in 2019, the Puffin Foundation Grant in 2019, the Real Art Award from Real Art Ways in Hartford, CT in 2019.

=== Public collections ===
Ouyang has three sculptures in the Nasher Sculpture Center collection. Their 2022 film "Strange Attractor" is in the collections of the Brooklyn Museum and High Museum of Art. Other permanent collections include the Los Angeles County Museum of Art, Columbus Museum of Art, Perez Art Museum Miami, Cantor Arts Center at Stanford University, Kadist Foundation, Pond Society, X Museum, the Museum of Fine Arts Boston and Faurschou Foundation.
