= SculptureCenter =

Art space in Queens, New York

Coordinates: 40°44′48.5″N 73°56′27.69″W

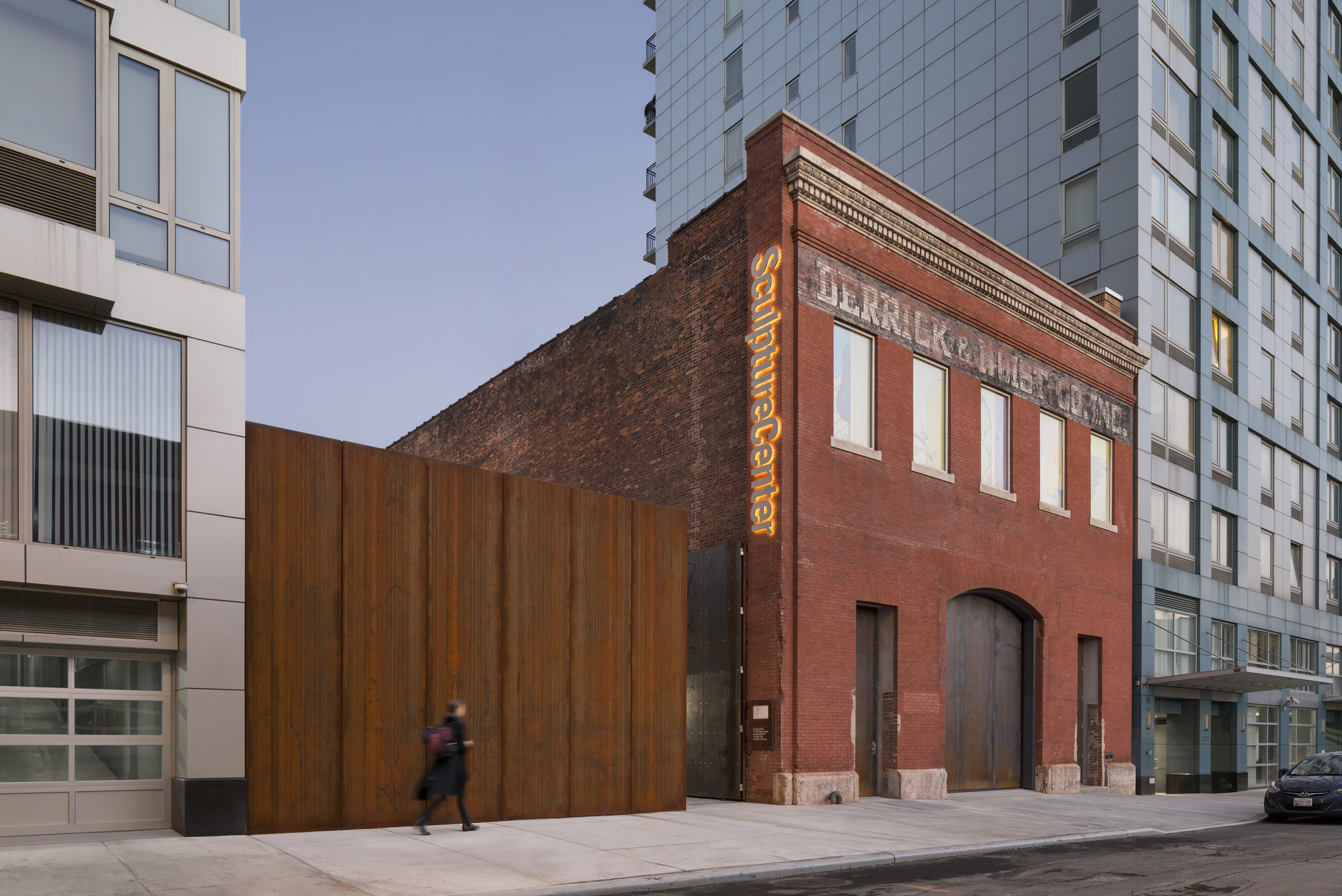
SculptureCenter's New Building. Photo: Michael Moran.

SculptureCenter is a not-for-profit, contemporary art museum located in Long Island City, Queens, New York City. It was founded in 1928 as "The Clay Club" by Dorothea Denslow. In 2013, SculptureCentre attracted around 13,000 visitors.

== History ==
Founded in Crown Heights, Brooklyn, in 1928 as The Clay Club, it was located across the street from the Brooklyn Children's Museum. Its founder, sculptor Dorothea H. Denslow, invited local children and later other artists to share her studio.

SculptureCenter soon moved to 8 West Fourth Street in the West Village in 1932 and then, in 1948, to a carriage house at 167 East 69th Street on the Upper East Side, where it operated a school with artists’ studios. The offerings included clay and wax modeling, stone and wood carving, welding, figure studies and portraits. There were are also after-school classes for children.

In 2001, SculptureCenter's board closed both the school and the studios, sold the carriage house for $4.75 million and invested the proceeds in reinventing the organization in Queens as a European-style kunsthalle. The board also commissioned architects Maya Lin and David Hotson to transform a derelict brick building into an exhibition space of 6,000-square-foot (560 m^{2}) with forty-foot-high ceilings and reinforced-concrete floors.

In 2014, SculptureCenter underwent a 14-month, $4.5 million expansion and renovation led by architect Andrew Berman, including a 2,000-square-foot (190 m^{2}) addition, aimed at improving visitor experience and increasing exhibition space to 6,700 sq ft (620 m^{2}), plus a 1,500 sq ft (140 m^{2}) enclosed courtyard for outdoor exhibitions and events.

== Program ==
SculptureCenter has presented works by over 750 artists through its annual exhibition program, including Turner Prize winner Charlotte Prodger and nominee Anthea Hamilton, Sanford Biggers, Nairy Baghramian, Tom Burr, Liz Glynn, Rochelle Goldberg, Camille Henrot, Leslie Hewitt, Rashid Johnson, Rita McBride, Catalina Ouyang, Ugo Rondinone, Katrín Sigurdardóttir, Alexandre Singh, Monika Sosnowska, Gedi Sibony, Mika Tajima, and Hugo Boss Prize winners Anicka Yi and Simone Leigh.

As a non-collecting museum, its annual program includes approximately three exhibition cycles of 1–2 commissioning programs by mid-career artists, 10–15 projects and commissions by emerging artists, and 3–6 solo and group exhibitions. SculptureCenter offers free public programs and events including artist talks, performances, film screenings, and publications.

== Notable people ==
=== Alumni ===
- Beonne Boronda (1911–2012)
- Frank Eliscu (1912–1996)
- Harry Holtzman (1912–1987),
- Katie Ohe (born 1937)
- Ibram Lassaw (1913–2003)
- Barbara Lekberg (1925–2018)
- Clement Renzi (1925–2009)

=== Faculty and leadership ===
- Armand Phillip Bartos (1910–2005) chairperson emeritus
- Dorothea H. Denslow (1900–1971) founder
- Sahl Swarz (1912–2004) welded sculpture teacher

=== Directors ===
- 1999–2019: Mary Ceruti
- 2019–2020: Christian Rattemeyer
- 2020–2022: Kyle Dancewicz (ad interim)
- 2022–present: Sohrab Mohebbi
