= Edouard de Laurot =

Polish-American filmmaker

Edward Lada Laudański (23 April 1922, Łódź – 23 March 1993, New York, New York) better known as Édouard de Laurot, a.k.a. Yves de Laurot, was a filmmaker and writer of Polish/French nationality.

== Early life in Poland ==
Jonas Mekas (2007) notes the incredible circumstances of De Laurot's life, including his experiences in the Polish Resistance and surviving the second Warsaw Uprising during World War II. In a video interview Mekas recounts how Laurot would tell the friends of the engaged cinema group tall stories, including how he was chosen by the Polish resistance in Warsaw to swim across the river Wisla, under German fire, and deliver a message to the Soviets on the other bank, which was too incredible for anyone to believe.

A Washington lawyer later confirmed the story on a visit to Warsaw – Laudański in fact was the messenger who swam the river. After the uprising Edward Laudański worked for British Secret Service. After the war he studied in England. In 1950, he obtained a diploma in English studies at Cambridge University.

In his interview "Yves de Laurot defines Cinema engagé" (Cinéaste, Spring 1970) Laurot/Laudański describes how he first held a film camera. His group of Polish partisans had captured a German tank, and found a military Arriflex 35mm in the tank. According to Laurot a young German soldier, despite having a gun, was persuaded to surrender and teach the partisans how to use the camera in exchange for his life.

== United States ==
From the early 1950s Laudański/Laurot began to be involved in film and criticism, offering encouragement to Peter Weiss. De Laurot cofounded Film Culture magazine with Jonas Mekas in 1955, providing a Marxist-theoretical perspective to their criticism which Mekas later abandoned. Mekas describes De Laurot's imperious style, to which he attributes many of the shortcomings of their collaboration on Guns of the Trees.

De Laurot directed two documentaries via his production company, "Cinema Engagé." Black Liberation (1967) (also known as Silent Revolution) won the Agis Cup at Festival Del Popoli, Florence Italy 1968; the Silver Lion for Documentary at Venice International Festival, and the Ducat for Best Short Documentary at Mannheim West Germany in 1968. The film was narrated by Ossie Davis and featured voice recordings of Malcolm X and others of the Black Power movement.

His second film was Listen, America! (1968) televised on the Canadian Broadcasting Corp. It included powerful images shot on location at some of the most memorable demonstrations of 1967 and 1968 including the Pentagon, the Chicago Democratic Convention and riots, the occupation of Columbia University, and the Central Park Be-In. It included interviews with Noam Chomsky and others, and it focused on the political polarization of the New Left and the Right, the Anti War Movement, the assassinations of Dr. Martin Luther King and Robert Kennedy, and the 1968 Presidential Elections.

Shortly after, de Laurot was interviewed by Cineaste magazine, which then published over several issues of his manifesto for a "Cinema Engagé." The Summer of 1969 issue of Cineaste was the last to identify itself as "A Magazine for the Film Student", and two issues later Cineaste announced that it had become "a magazine of cinema engagé—a cinema engaged in the movement for social change."

A 1973 Cineaste article later critiqued de Laurot's Cinema Engage as "deeply imbedded in forms that would inhibit political action" like idolizing "the lonely hero or isolated guerrilla group who are mediators between 'truth' and the action of the followers" over "showing masses of people struggling for change".

== Scripts ==
His companion in the eighties was Zoë Tamerlis Lund. Mekas in his filmed interview stated that he believed that Laurot, as much or more than his girlfriend Zoë Tamerlis Lund, was behind the script for the Harvey Keitel film Bad Lieutenant. David Scott Milton also vouched this claim. After his death in 1993, and before hers in 1999, Zoe bequeathed the manuscript of a novel he had written to Mekas.
