= Gia Carangi =

American supermodel (1960–1986)

- Carangi in 1982
- Born: Gia Marie Carangi; January 29, 1960; Philadelphia, Pennsylvania, U.S.
- Died: November 18, 1986 (aged 26); Philadelphia, Pennsylvania, U.S.
- Cause of death: AIDS-related complications
- Occupation: Model
- Years active: 1977–1983
- Modeling information
- Height: 1.73 m (5 ft 8 in)
- Hair color: Brown
- Eye color: Brown
- Agency: Wilhelmina Models; Ford Models; Legends; Elite Model Management

Gia Marie Carangi (January 29, 1960 – November 18, 1986) was an American supermodel, considered by some to be the first supermodel. In 2023, Harper's Bazaar ranked her 15th among the greatest supermodels in the 1980s. She was featured on the cover of numerous magazines, including multiple editions of Vogue and Cosmopolitan, and appeared in advertising campaigns for fashion houses including Armani, Dior, Versace and Yves Saint Laurent.

After Carangi became addicted to heroin, her career rapidly declined, which ultimately led her to quit modeling in 1983. In 1986, at age 26, she died of AIDS. Believed to have contracted it from a contaminated needle, she became one of the early notable women to die of the virus. Her life was dramatized in Michael Cristofer's television film Gia (1998) starring Angelina Jolie as Carangi.

== Early life ==
Carangi was born on January 29, 1960, in Philadelphia, the youngest of three children of Joseph Carangi, a restaurant owner, and Kathleen Carangi (née Adams). She had two older brothers. Her parents' marriage became violent, and Kathleen left the family when Carangi was eleven; the children remained with their father. Fried reported that Carangi was sexually abused at the age of five.

As a teenager, Carangi attended Abraham Lincoln High School, where she became one of Philadelphia's "Bowie kids", young fans of David Bowie who adopted the androgynous style associated with glam rock. Carangi and her friends also frequented Philadelphia gay clubs and attended Bowie concerts. Friends recalled that she openly pursued girls during adolescence, sometimes sending them flowers and poems.

== Career ==
After being featured in Philadelphia newspaper ads and being discovered by Sondra Scerca in Maurice Tannenbaum's hair salon, Carangi moved to New York City at the age of 17, where she signed with Wilhelmina Models. Her first major shoot, published in October 1978, was with top fashion photographer Chris von Wangenheim, who had her pose nude behind a chain-link fence with makeup artist Sandy Linter. Carangi immediately became infatuated with Linter and pursued her, though the relationship never became stable. By the end of 1978, her first year in New York, Carangi was already a well-established model. Of her quick rise to prominence, described by Vogue as "meteoric", Carangi later said, "I started working with very good people, I mean all the time, very fast. I didn't build into a model, I just sort of became one." Carangi was earning half a million dollars in a year at the height of her career.

Carangi was a favorite model of various fashion photographers, including Von Wangenheim, Francesco Scavullo, Arthur Elgort, Richard Avedon and Denis Piel. Well-integrated within the fashion world, she had the selection of several photographers, most notably Scavullo. Carangi was featured on the cover of many fashion magazines, including the April 1979 issue of British Vogue, the April 1979 and August 1980 issues of Vogue Paris, the August 1980 issue of Vogue, the February 1981 issue of Vogue Italia, and multiple issues of Cosmopolitan between 1979 and 1982. During these years, she also appeared in various advertising campaigns for high-profile fashion houses, including Armani, André Laug, Christian Dior, Versace, and Yves Saint Laurent. At the height of her career, Carangi was most known in modeling circles by only her first name. During this time, she also appeared in the Blondie music video for the single "Atomic".

A regular at Studio 54 and the Mudd Club, Carangi usually used cocaine in clubs. After her agent, mentor and friend Wilhelmina Cooper, died of lung cancer in March 1980, a devastated Carangi increased her drug usage and developed an addiction to heroin. Carangi's addiction soon began to affect her work; she had violent temper tantrums, walked out of photo shoots to buy drugs, and fell asleep in front of the camera. Scavullo recalled a fashion shoot with Carangi in the Caribbean when "she was crying, she couldn't find her drugs. I literally had to lay her down on her bed until she fell asleep." During one of her final location shoots for American Vogue, Carangi had red bumps in the crooks of her elbows where she had injected heroin. Despite airbrushing, some of the photos, as published in the November 1980 issue, reportedly still showed visible needle marks.

In November 1980, Carangi left Wilhelmina Models and signed with Ford Models, but she was dropped within weeks. By then, her career was in a steep decline. Modeling offers soon ceased and her fashion industry friends, including Sandy Linter, refused to speak to her, fearing their association with her would harm their careers. In an attempt to quit using drugs, she moved back to Philadelphia with her mother and stepfather in February 1981. Carangi underwent a 21-day detox program, but her sobriety was short-lived. She was arrested in March 1981 after she drove into a fence in a suburban neighborhood. After a chase with police, she was taken into custody where it was later determined she was under the influence of alcohol and cocaine. After her release, Carangi briefly signed with a new agency, Legends, and worked sporadically, mainly in Europe.

In late 1981, although still using drugs, Carangi was determined to make a comeback in the fashion industry and signed with Elite Model Management. While some clients refused to work with her, others were willing to hire her because of her past status as a top model. Scavullo photographed her for the April 1982 cover of Cosmopolitan, her last cover appearance for an American magazine. Sean Byrnes, Scavullo's long-time assistant, later said, "What she was doing to herself finally became apparent in her pictures. ... I could see the change in her beauty. There was an emptiness in her eyes."

Carangi then mainly worked with photographer Albert Watson and found work modeling for department stores and catalogs. She appeared in an advertising campaign for Versace, shot by Richard Avedon. He hired her for the fashion house's next campaign, but during the photo shoot, in late 1982, Carangi became uncomfortable and left before any usable shots of her were taken. Around this time, Carangi enrolled in an outpatient methadone program but soon began using heroin again. By the end of 1982, she had only a few clients that were willing to hire her. Carangi's final photo shoot was for German mail-order clothing company Otto GmbH in Tunisia; she was sent home during the shoot for using heroin. She left New York for the final time in early 1983.

== Death ==
Carangi spent most of her modeling earnings on drugs, and spent the final three years of her life with various lovers, friends, and family members in Philadelphia, Pennsylvania, and Atlantic City, New Jersey. She was admitted to an intense drug treatment program at Eagleville Hospital in December 1984. She was in intense therapy and was able to stay sober for seven months. After treatment, she got a job in a clothing store which she eventually quit. She later found employment as a checkout clerk and then worked in the cafeteria of a nursing home. By late 1985, she had begun using drugs again and was engaging in prostitution in Atlantic City. She had cancelled the meetings with her therapist, bought as much heroin as she could, and attempted suicide.

In December 1985, Carangi was admitted to Warminster General Hospital in Warminster, Pennsylvania, with bilateral pneumonia. A few days later, she was diagnosed with AIDS-related complex. Carangi was hospitalized in October 1986 feeling weak. On October 18, she was admitted to Hahnemann University Hospital in Philadelphia. Carangi died at the Hahnemann Hospital of AIDS-related complications one month later on November 18, 1986, at the age of 26. Her funeral was held on November 23 at a small funeral home in Philadelphia. No one from the fashion world attended. However, weeks later, fashion photographer Francesco Scavullo, Carangi's friend and confidant, sent a Mass card when he learned of her death.

== Filmography ==
=== Film ===
Year	Title	Role	Notes	Ref.
2001	Gia: The E! True Hollywood Story	Self	Archival footage, posthumous release.	
2001	Vanished: Shooting Star	Self	Archival footage, posthumous release.	
2003	The Self-Destruction of Gia	Self	Archival footage, posthumous release	
2023	George Michael: Portrait of an Artist	Self	Archival footage, posthumous release	
2023	The Super Models	Self	Archival footage, posthumous release	

=== Television ===
Year	Title	Role	Notes	Ref.
1982	20/20	Self	Episode:	
2009–2011	20 to One	Self	Archival footage, posthumous release. Episodes: Sizzling Superstars, Sizzling Supermodels	

=== Commercials ===
Year	Company	Notes	Ref.
1980	Maybelline	"SuperShiny Automatic Lip Color"	

=== Music videos ===
Year	Title	Artist	Album	Ref.
1980	"Atomic"	Blondie	Eat to the Beat	

== Legacy ==
Carangi's rise to fame as an androgynous brunette in an industry full of blue-eyed blondes is believed to have started heroin chic. Carangi is often considered to be the first supermodel, although that title has been applied to others, including Margaux Hemingway, Audrey Munson, Lisa Fonssagrives, Dorian Leigh, Twiggy, Jean Shrimpton, Cheryl Tiegs and Janice Dickinson. Model Cindy Crawford, who rose to prominence the year Carangi died, was referred to as "Baby Gia" because of her resemblance to Carangi. Crawford later recalled, "My agents took me to all the photographers who liked Gia: Albert Watson, Francesco Scavullo, Bill King. Everyone loved her look so much that they gladly saw me." Additionally, Carangi, who was openly lesbian, is considered a lesbian icon and is said to have "epitomized lesbian chic more than a decade before the term was coined." Argentine model Mica Argañaraz has often been compared to Carangi, whom she considers a beauty icon.

Carangi's life has been the subject of several works. A biography of Carangi by Stephen Fried titled Thing of Beauty—taken from the first line of John Keats' famous poem Endymion—was published in 1993. Gia, a biographical film starring Angelina Jolie, debuted on HBO in 1998. Jolie won a Golden Globe Award and a Screen Actors Guild Award for her performance, among other accolades. A documentary titled The Self-Destruction of Gia, released in 2003, showcased footage of Carangi, contemporary interviews with Carangi's family and former colleagues, including Sandy Linter, and footage of actress-screenwriter Zoë Lund, herself a heroin addict, who had been commissioned to write a screenplay based upon Carangi's life at the time of her own death of drug-related causes in 1999.

Carangi is commemorated on the AIDS Memorial Quilt on block #5949, block #3505, and block #4113.

== Designers and brands represented ==
- Armani
- Bloomingdale's
- Citicorp
- Cutex
- Christian Dior
- Perry Ellis
- Diane von Fürstenberg
- Lancetti
- Levi's
- Maybelline
- Yves Saint Laurent
- Versace
- Vidal Sassoon
