= Stretch Number 1 =

2003 sculpture by Evan Penny

Stretch #1
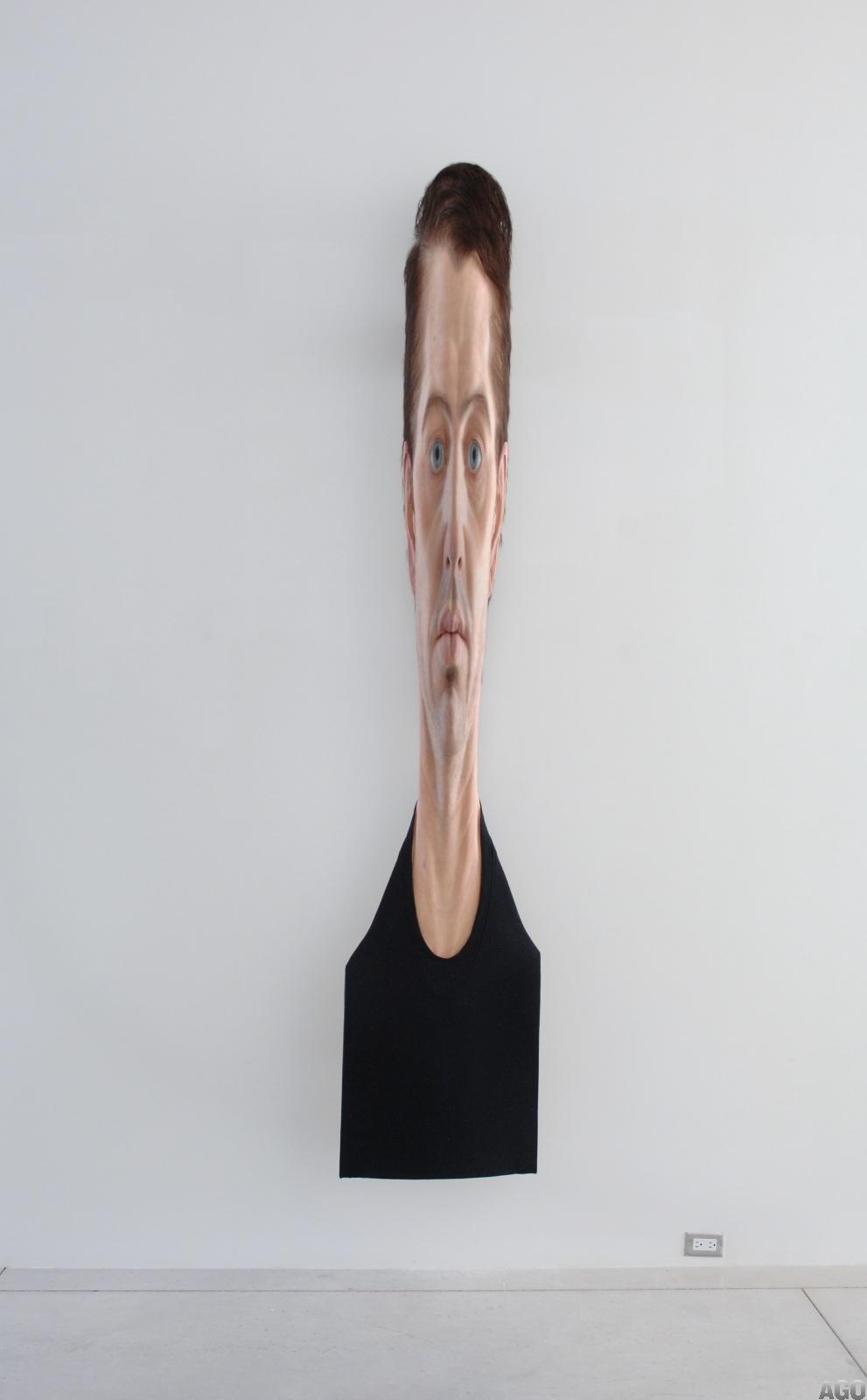

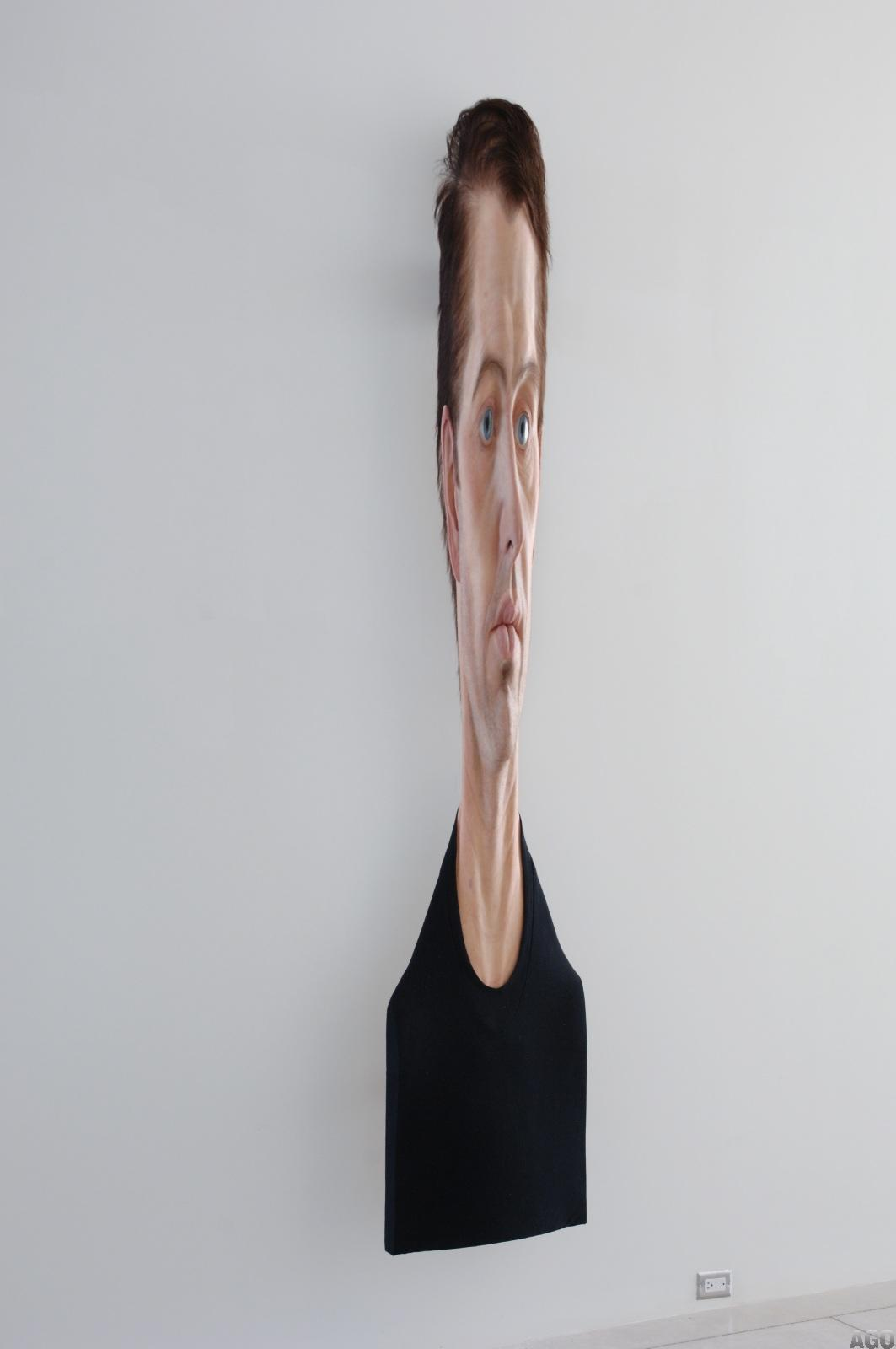
- Material: Silicone, pigment, hair, fabric, aluminum
- Size: 275 × 54 × 25 cm
- Created: 2003
- Present location: Art Gallery of Ontario
- Identification: 2008/124

Stretch #1 is a sculpture by Evan Penny in the collection of the Art Gallery of Ontario located in Toronto, Ontario, Canada.

== Description ==
Stretch #1 (2003) is a silicone sculpture and a component of the Stretch and Anamorph series by the Canadian artist Evan Penny. This series explores the manipulation of images of the human body that has been made possible with editing programs such as Photoshop. Penny’s large-scale, distorted, silicone sculptures show what these two-dimensional image renderings would look like in three-dimensional form. The tension between the photographic-realism of two-dimensional visual media and three-dimensional sculpture has been the theme for most of Penny’s career.

“I try to situate my sculpture somewhere between the way we perceive each other in real time and space and the way we perceive ourselves and each other in an image.” – Evan Penny

With the word "stretch", Penny is referring to the editing effect of the same name in Photoshop. "Anamorph" is an optics term that refers to the illusion created when a distorted image appears as if it is in normal perspective when viewed from a particular angle. Instead of working from a normal image, skewing it in Photoshop, and then rendering it in clay, as one might expect, Penny creates his three-dimensional sculptures from a skewed sketch of an imaginary character which he then moulds into clay. Penny describes the process in the following geometric terms. If you stretch out a cube by each of the eight corners in completely different directions and angles until there are no right angles or parallel lines left, what you have is a three-dimensional rhomboid. When viewed at a certain angle it may appear to be a normal cube, but physically it remains distorted. When photographed Penny’s sculptures can be compressed in Photoshop to create a very realistic two-dimensional image of a naturally proportioned person, but everything around them will be distorted.

Penny claims to begin each sculpture with a question to himself, “What would happen if I take a distortion of the human body that is ‘normalized’ in an image context, that we might assume belongs exclusively to the image world, and bring that into the space we physically occupy?” The result are sculptures that are fascinating in their attention to details, and horrific in their flattened, unnatural forms. They are at once “wholly unbelievable and undeniable.”

== Historical information ==
=== Acquisition ===
This work was gifted to the AGO in 2008 by David and Kristin Ferguson.
