= Barbara Lekberg =

American sculptor

- Born: Barbara Ann Hult; March 19, 1925; Portland, Oregon, U.S.
- Died: February 14, 2018 (aged 92); New York City, New York, U.S.
- Other names: Barbara Hult Lekberg, Barbara A. Hult Lekberg
- Education: University of Iowa, SculptureCenter
- Spouse: Victor Tamerlis (m. 1956; died 1992)
- Children: Zoë Lund
- Awards: Guggenheim Fellowship

Barbara Ann Lekberg (née Barbara Ann Hult; March 19, 1925 – February 14, 2018) was an American sculptor.

== Early life and education ==
Barbara Lekberg was born as Barbara Ann Hult on March 19, 1925, in Portland, Oregon. Her mother was music teacher Mildred Anderson, and her father was in the family lumber business, Melvin Hult. She spent her early childhood in Oregon, and later in Illinois and Iowa.

Lekberg attended University of Iowa, studying sculpture under Humbert Albrizio, Philip Guston, and Mauricio Lasansky. She graduated in 1946 with a B.A. degree in sculpture, and in 1947 with a M.A. degree in art history. She moved to New York City in the late 1940s. Lekberg studied at The Clay Club (now known as the SculptureCenter), under Sahl Swarz and learned how to weld steel sculptures.

== Career ==
Her first solo exhibition was in 1959 at the SculptureCenter. She made large figurative metal sculptures, often involving draped fabrics. Lekberg taught classes at the University of the Arts, from 1981 to 2001.

She was a member of the National Academy of Design. Lekberg was awarded the Guggenheim Fellowship in fine arts two times (1957, 1959).

== Personal life ==
In 1956, she married Victor Tamerlis, a rare-books dealer and together they lived in Greenwich Village. They had a daughter born in 1962, Zoe Tamerlis Lund. The short film Zoe Rising (2014), documented their daughter's life through the memories of Barbara Lekberg.

Lekberg died on February 14, 2018, in a nursing home in the Bronx, after struggling with Alzheimer's disease.
