= Lester D. Boronda =

American painter, furniture designer (1886–1953)

Lester David Boronda
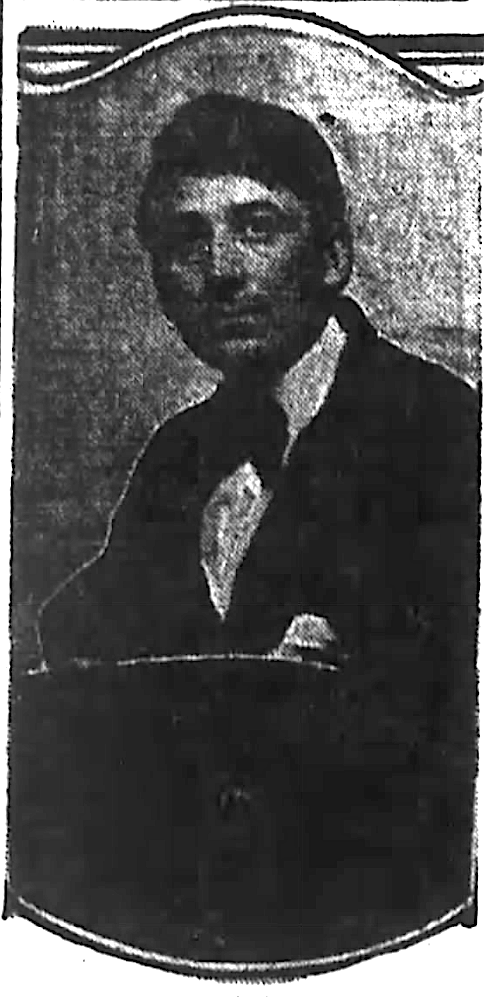
- Lester David Boronda, c. 1921
- Born: July 24, 1886; Reno, Nevada, U.S.
- Died: September 15, 1953 (aged 67); New Haven, Connecticut, U.S.
- Burial place: Swan Point Cemetery, Providence, Rhode Island, U.S.
- Other name: Lester Boronda
- Education: Mark Hopkins Institute of Art, Art Students League of New York
- Occupations: Painter, sculptor, wrought iron furniture designer
- Spouse: Ruby Elizabeth Drew (m. 1909–1953; his death)
- Children: 2, including Beonne Boronda

Lester David Boronda (July 24, 1886 – September 15, 1953) was an American painter, sculptor, and furniture designer. He came from a prominent Californio family of Monterey County, California and was known for his genre paintings and landscape paintings. Most of his career was spent in New York City, and Mason's Island in Mystic, Connecticut.

== Early life, family, and education ==
Lester David Boronda was born on July 24, 1886, in California, to parents Maria Ray (née Harris) and Jose Sylvano Boronda. On his paternal side he was a descendant from a prominent Spanish Colonial family, and his great-grandfather was José Eusebio Boronda y Higuera, a member of Junipero Serra’s second expedition into California in 1770, who settled in Rancho Rincón del Sanjón (now Boronda, California) in Monterey County, California. Boronda attended Salinas High School, where he graduated in 1903.

He studied art at Mark Hopkins Institute of Art (later San Francisco Art Institute) in San Francisco, under Arthur Frank Mathews. At Mark Hopkins, his classmates included Thomas A. McGlynn (1878–1966) and E. Charlton Fortune. He continued his studies at the Art Students League of New York, under Frank DuMond.

In 1909, Boronda and Ruby Elizabeth Drew from Sacramento were married in New York City. The couple met during the San Francisco Fire in 1906, when Drew had escaped her burning home and was found by Borondo on the streets separated from her family. Together they had two children, and his older daughter Beonne Boronda Liebig (1911–2012) was a noted sculptor and painter who was active in the arts in Mystic, Connecticut.

After marriage he studied art in Paris under Jean-Paul Laurens, and in Munich.

== Career ==
Boronda was an early member of the Carmel Art Association. In 1910, he had an exhibition at Del Monte Fine Art gallery in Carmel, California. In his early career he worked as a landscape and genre painter of "Old Monterey". After moving to New York City in 1912, he continued to paint Old Monterey scenes, as well as focused on genre painting of city street scenes. His art studio was in Greenwich Village for many years.

In 1912, Boronda returned to San Francisco to showed his painting work in a group exhibition alongside members of the Bohemian Club at St. Francis Hotel (now Westin St. Francis). At the juried 17th Annual Exhibition (1913) at the Carnegie Museum of Art in Pittsburgh, Pennsylvania, Boronda was one of the featured artists. In 1923, he had a solo exhibition of his paintings and wrought iron furniture at the Baltimore Museum of Art.

His artwork is found in museum collections, including at the Pennsylvania Academy of the Fine Arts, the Oakland Museum of California, and the Monterey Museum of Art.

== Death and legacy ==
He died on September 15, 1953, at Grace–New Haven Hospital in New Haven, Connecticut. He has a grave at Swan Point Cemetery in Providence, Rhode Island, and also has a niche alongside his wife at Fresh Pond Crematory and Columbarium in Queens, New York City.

After his death, a scholarship called the Boronda Scholars was endowed to Hartnell College, a community college in Salinas, California, specifically for students studying painting, sculpture, architecture, literature, drama, music, or dance. Boronda is profiled in the Edan Milton Hughes' book, Artists in California, 1786–1940 (1986).

== Exhibitions ==
- 1910, solo exhibition, Del Monte Fine Art, Carmel, California
- 1912, juried group exhibition, St. Francis Hotel, San Francisco, California
- 1913, 17th Annual Exhibition, Carnegie Museum of Art, Pittsburgh, Pennsylvania
- 1923, solo exhibition, Baltimore Museum of Art, Baltimore, Maryland

== See also ==
- Jose Eusebio Boronda Adobe
- List of Californio people
