= Mountainhome, Pennsylvania =

Unincorporated community in Pennsylvania, US

Mountainhome
- Census-designated place
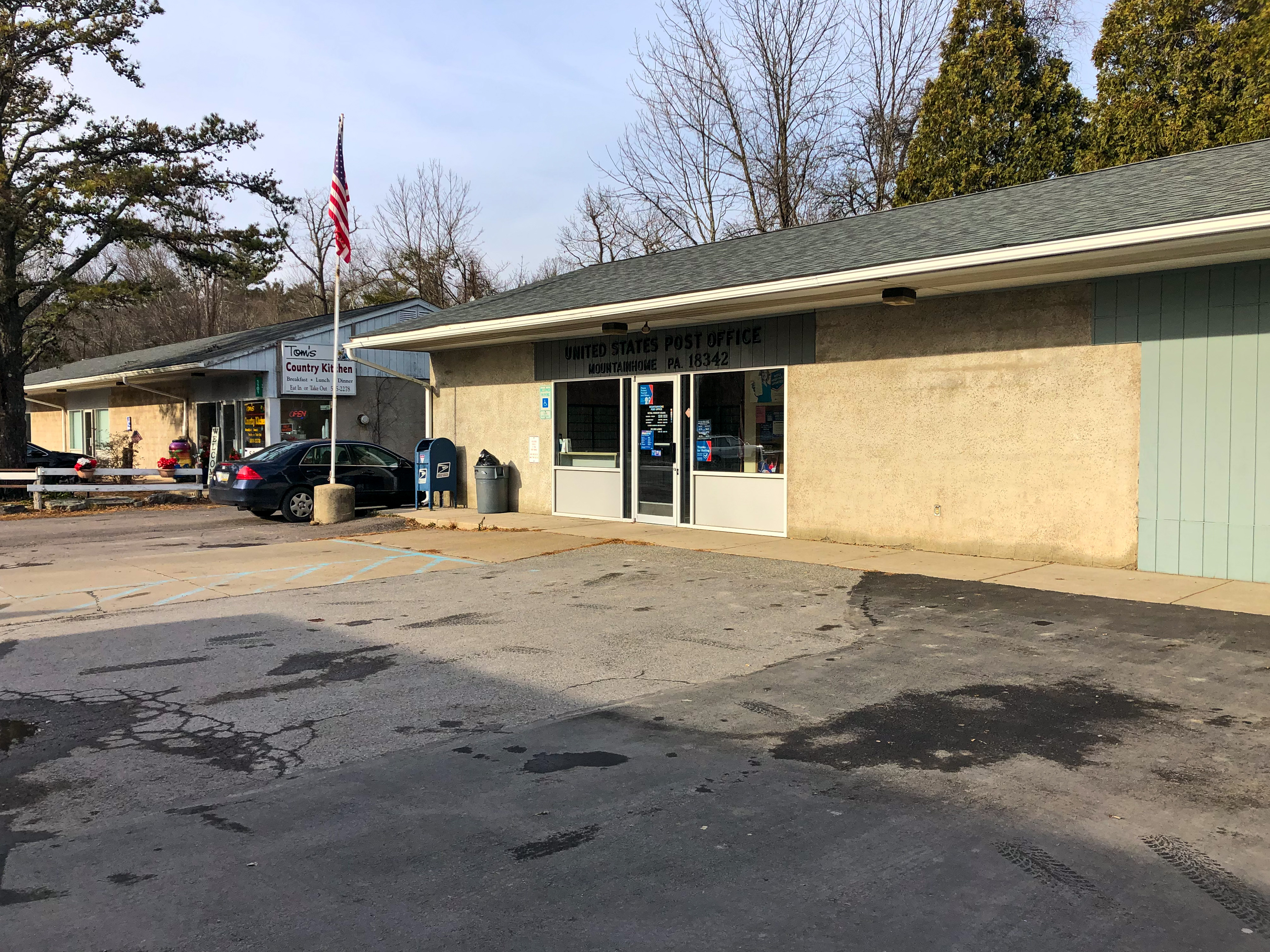
- US Post Office for Mountainhome

- Location of Mountainhome in Pennsylvania Mountainhome (the United States)
- Coordinates: 41°10′39″N 75°16′00″W
- Country: United States
- State: Pennsylvania
- County: Monroe
- Township: Barrett

Area
  - Total: 1.90 sq mi (4.91 km^{2})
  - Land: 1.90 sq mi (4.91 km^{2})
  - Water: 0 sq mi (0.00 km^{2})
- Elevation: 1,234 ft (376 m)

Population (2020)
  - Total: 1,202
  - Density: 634.3/sq mi (244.91/km^{2})
- Time zone: UTC-5 (EST)
  - Summer (DST): UTC-4 (EDT)
- ZIP code: 18342
- Area code(s): 570
- FIPS code: 42-51344

Mountainhome is a census-designated place (CDP) in Barrett Township, Pennsylvania, United States. The population was 1,182 at the 2010 census.

== Geography ==
Mountainhome is located at 41°10′39″N 75°16′0″W (41.177450, -75.266749).

According to the United States Census Bureau, the CDP has a total area of 1.9 square miles (4.9 km^{2}), all land.

Laura Randall described Mountainhome as "not a walkable kind of place, but it has several cafes, shops, and attractions like the Pocono Playhouse and Callie's Candy Factory."

== Demographics ==
Historical population
Census	Pop.	Note	%±
2020	1,202		—
U.S. Decennial Census

As of the census of 2000, there were 1,169 people, 491 households, and 315 families residing in the CDP. The population density was 619.0 inhabitants per square mile (239.0/km^{2}). There were 566 housing units at an average density of 299.7 per square mile (115.7/km^{2}). The racial makeup of the CDP was 95.47% White, 2.74% African American, 0.26% Native American, 0.51% Asian, 0.68% from other races, and 0.34% from two or more races. Hispanic or Latino of any race were 2.05% of the population.

There were 491 households, out of which 28.3% had children under the age of 18 living with them, 52.5% were married couples living together, 7.9% had a female householder with no husband present, and 35.8% were non-families. 31.8% of all households were made up of individuals, and 15.3% had someone living alone who was 65 years of age or older. The average household size was 2.38 and the average family size was 3.06.

In the CDP, the population was spread out, with 24.7% under the age of 18, 5.0% from 18 to 24, 25.5% from 25 to 44, 25.4% from 45 to 64, and 19.4% who were 65 years of age or older. The median age was 42 years. For every 100 females, there were 91.3 males. For every 100 females age 18 and over, there were 86.8 males.

The median income for a household in the CDP was $40,357, and the median income for a family was $49,868. Males had a median income of $30,709 versus $35,500 for females. The per capita income for the CDP was $20,580. About 4.3% of families and 6.2% of the population were below the poverty line, including 5.1% of those under age 18 and 4.3% of those age 65 or over.

== Education ==
The CDP is in the Pocono Mountain School District.
