= The Self-Destruction of Gia =

AN AMERICAN GIRL: The Self-Destruction of Gia
- Directed by: J.J. Martin
- Produced by: J.J. Martin
- Cinematography: Johan Holm
- Release date: May 7, 2003
- Running time: 80 mins
- Country: United States
- Language: English
- Budget: $1,000,000 (estimated)

AN AMERICAN GIRL: The Self-Destruction of Gia is a 2003 documentary film about model Gia Carangi and her death at 26. It was directed and produced by J.J. Martin and CINE L'MOD.

== Overview ==
In AN AMERICAN GIRL: The Self-Destruction of Gia, filmmaker JJ Martin explores Gia Carangi's life through rare home movies and photos, previously unseen interviews with Gia, and contemporary interviews with family, friends, and associates. Fashion photographer and friend Francesco Scavullo and designers Diane von Fürstenberg and Vera Wang describe Carangi's special spark, and the arc of her modeling career.

The life of Gia Carangi, who through her addiction to heroin contracted, and died of AIDS in 1986 at the age of 26, was also the subject of the HBO-produced docudrama Gia, starring Angelina Jolie.

AN AMERICAN GIRL: The Self-Destruction of Gia was shown at the 2003 Tribeca Film Festival.
