= José Eusebio Boronda Adobe =

Historic house in California, United States

- U.S. National Register of Historic Places
- California Historical Landmark
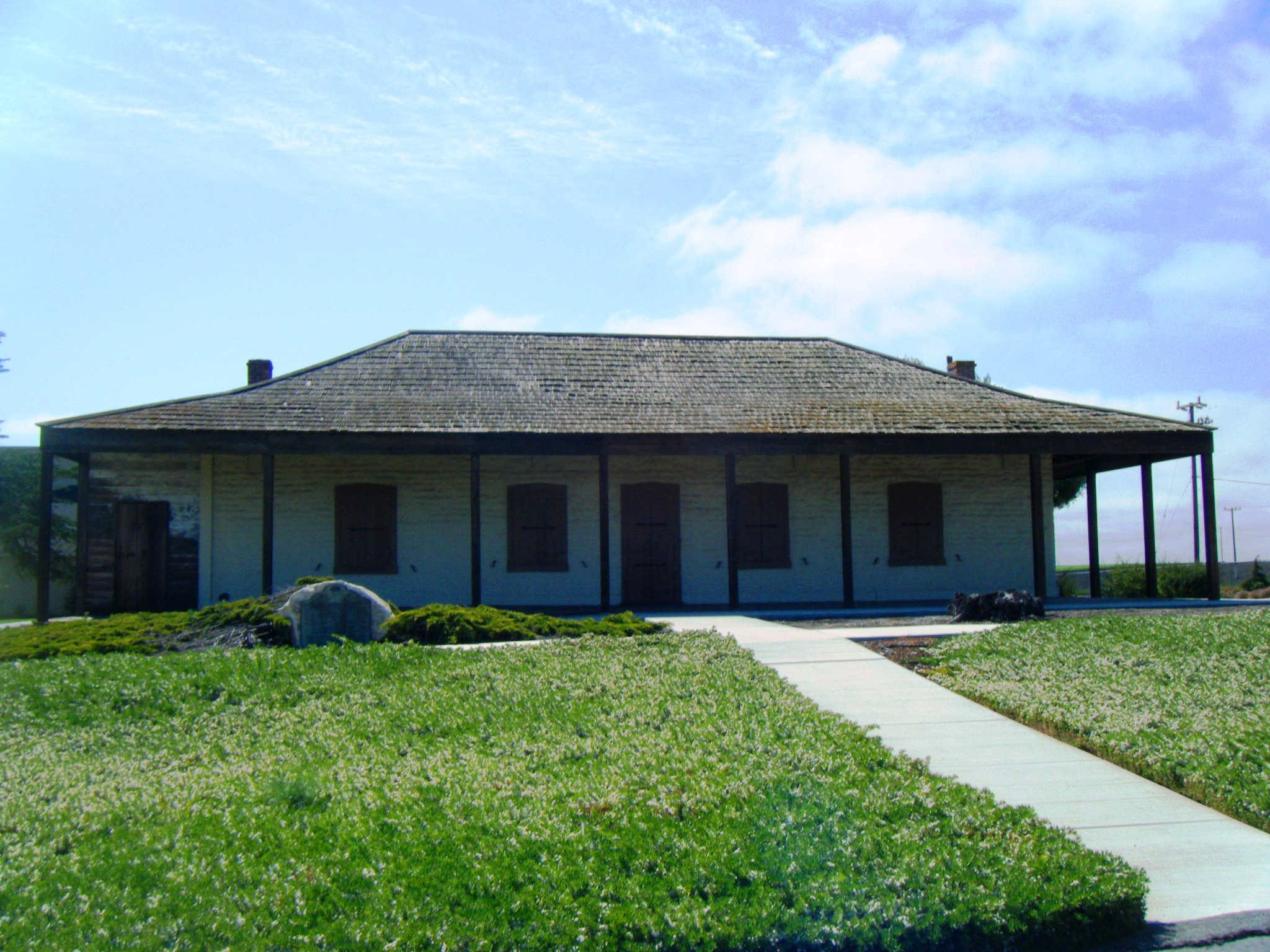

- Location within California Location within the United States
- Nearest city: Salinas, California
- Coordinates: 36°42′4″N 121°40′40″W
- Area: 5 acres (2.0 ha)
- Built: 1846
- Architect: Boronda, José Eusebio
- Architectural style: Monterey Colonial
- NRHP reference No.: 73000413
- CHISL No.: 870
- Added to NRHP: March 20, 1973

The José Eusebio Boronda Adobe is a Monterey Colonial style building from 1846, located in Salinas, Monterey County, California. The adobe was listed on the National Register of Historic Places on March 20, 1973, and is California Historical Landmark #870.

== History ==
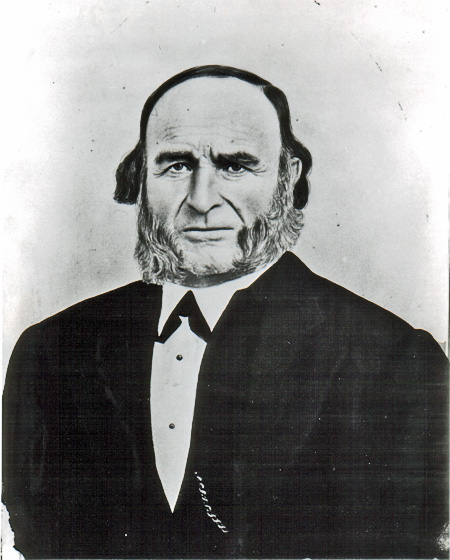
The Boronda Adobe is named after José Eusebio Boronda, a Californio ranchero.

The Boronda Adobe is a Spanish Colonial adobe, with a wood-shingled roof, wrap-around porches, open beamed ceilings, and two indoor fireplaces. It was built by José Eusebio Boronda between 1844 and 1848. The adobe is located on Boronda Road, northwest of Salinas, California. Boronda who was the grantee of Rancho Rincon de Sanjon, a 2,230-acre (9.0 km^{2}) Mexican land grant in present-day Monterey County, California given in 1840 by Governor Juan B. Alvarado to José Eusebio Boronda. Boronda is the third son of Captain José Manuel Boronda and Maria Gertrudis Higuera.

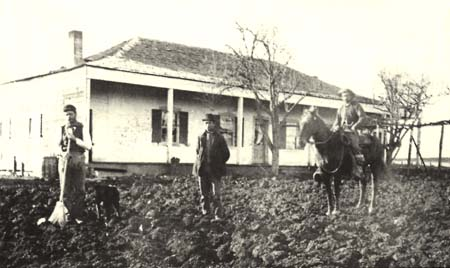
José Eusebio Boronda Adobe (1887)

In about 1887, the family members of William Anderson and Ines Boronda de Anderson, daughter of José Eusebio Boronda were living in the adobe. In the 1920s, Ygnacio Boronda (Eusebio's grandson) and his family was the last Borondas to live in the adobe. In 1929, the adobe property was sold to Charles Brooks who built his home behind the adobe.

== Boronda History Center ==
The Monterey County Historical Society (MCHS) acquired the Boronda Adobe in December 1972, from Marguerite (Earl) Wilson. The terms of the transaction was 3 acres (1.2 ha) of the adobe property was purchased for $5,500 (equivalent to $42,333 in 2025) and 2 acres (0.81 ha) and the adobe was a gift from Wilson. The adobe has been restored and was made into a museum in 1976. Today it operates as part of the Boronda History Center.

The registration for the José Eusebio Boronda Adobe as a California Historical Landmark dates back to March 15, 1974.

== Gallery ==
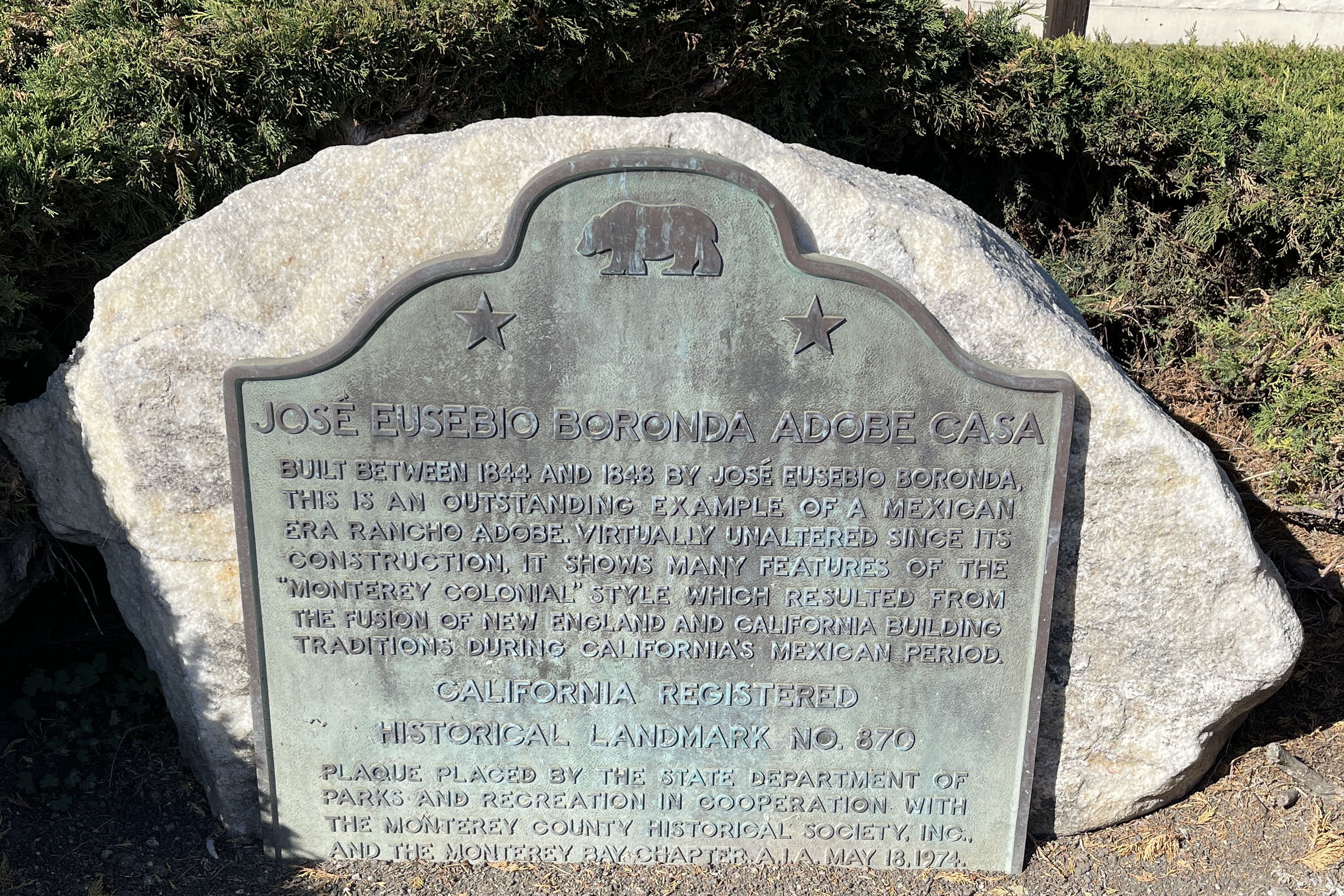

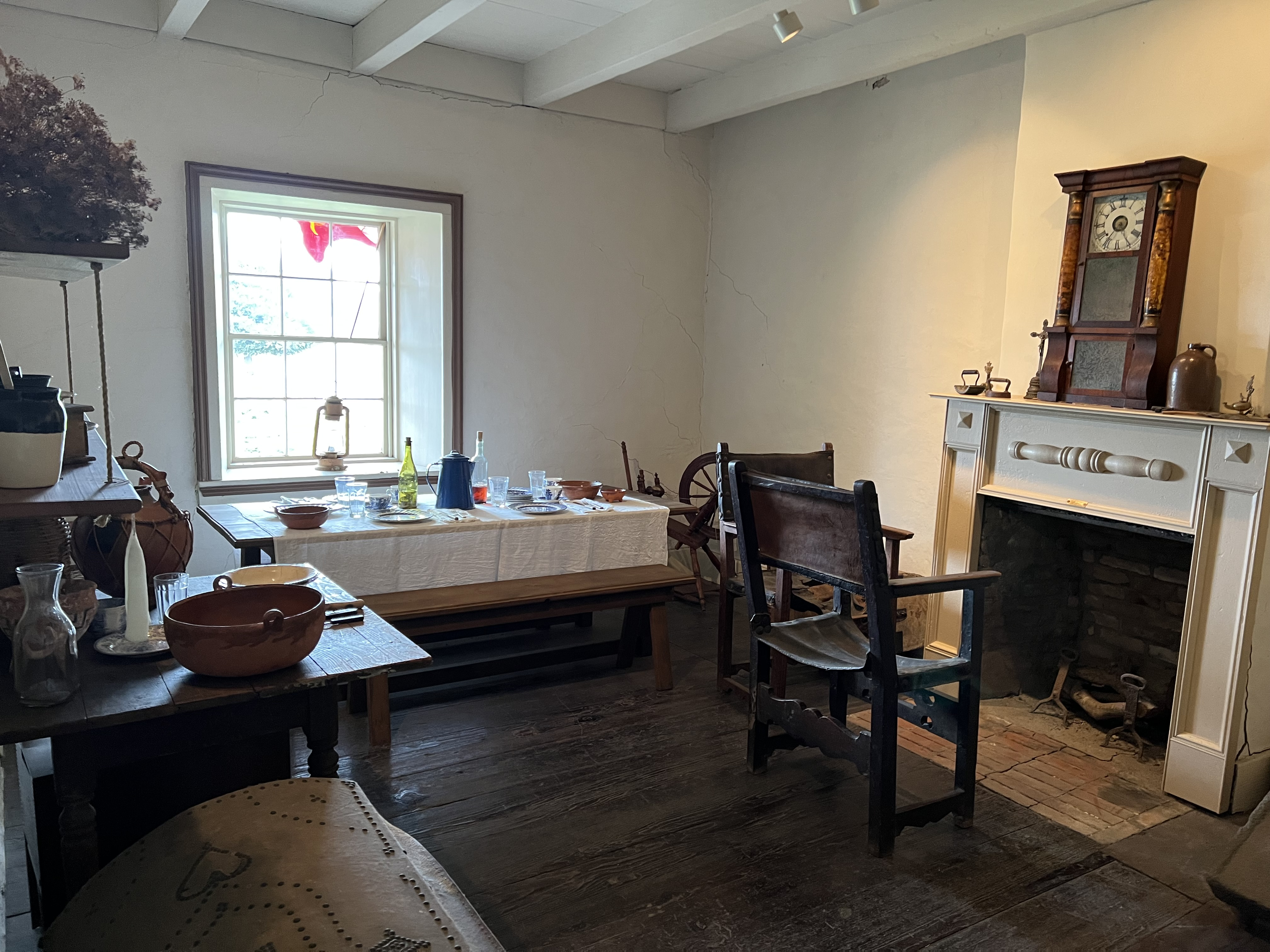

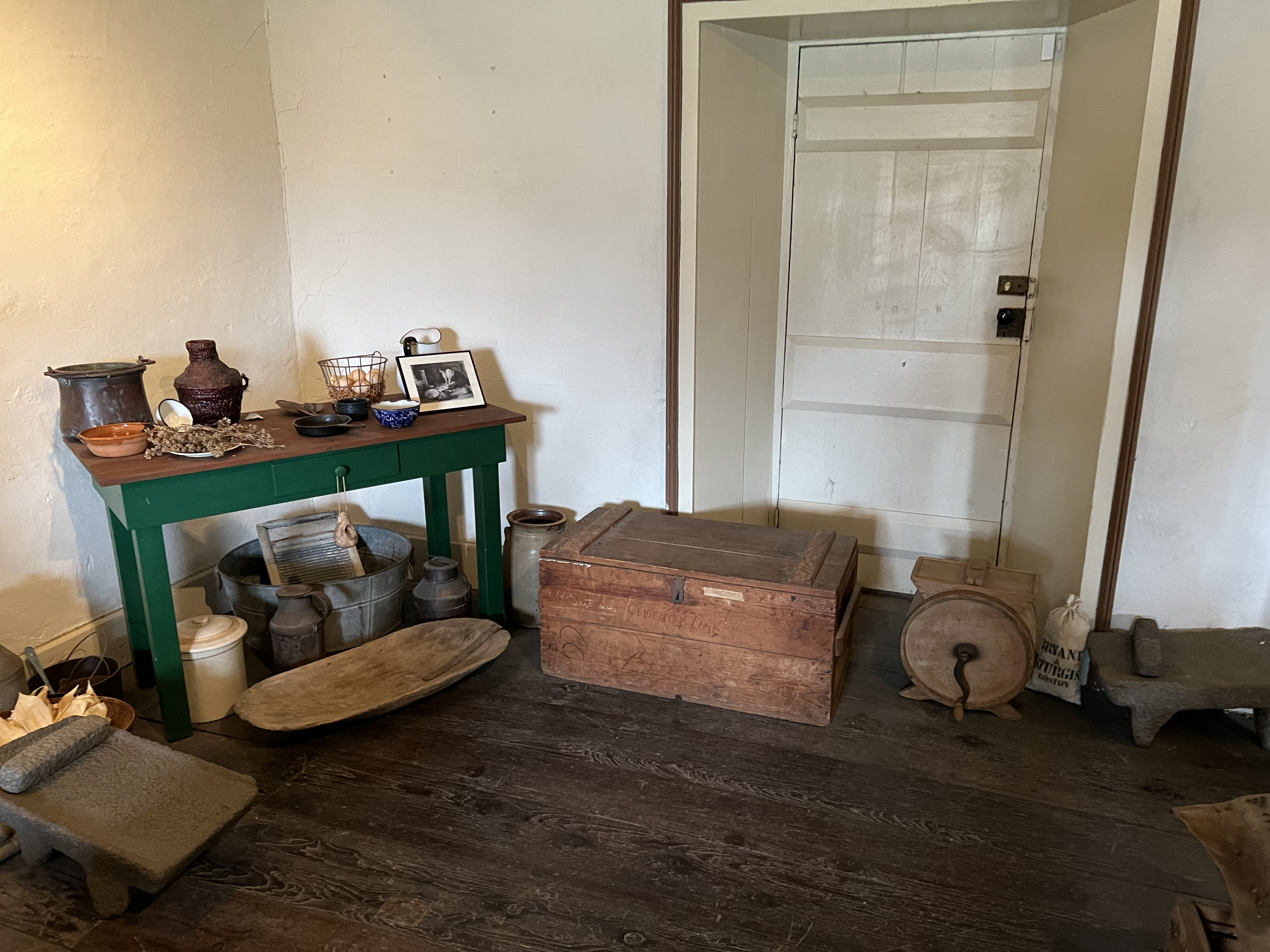

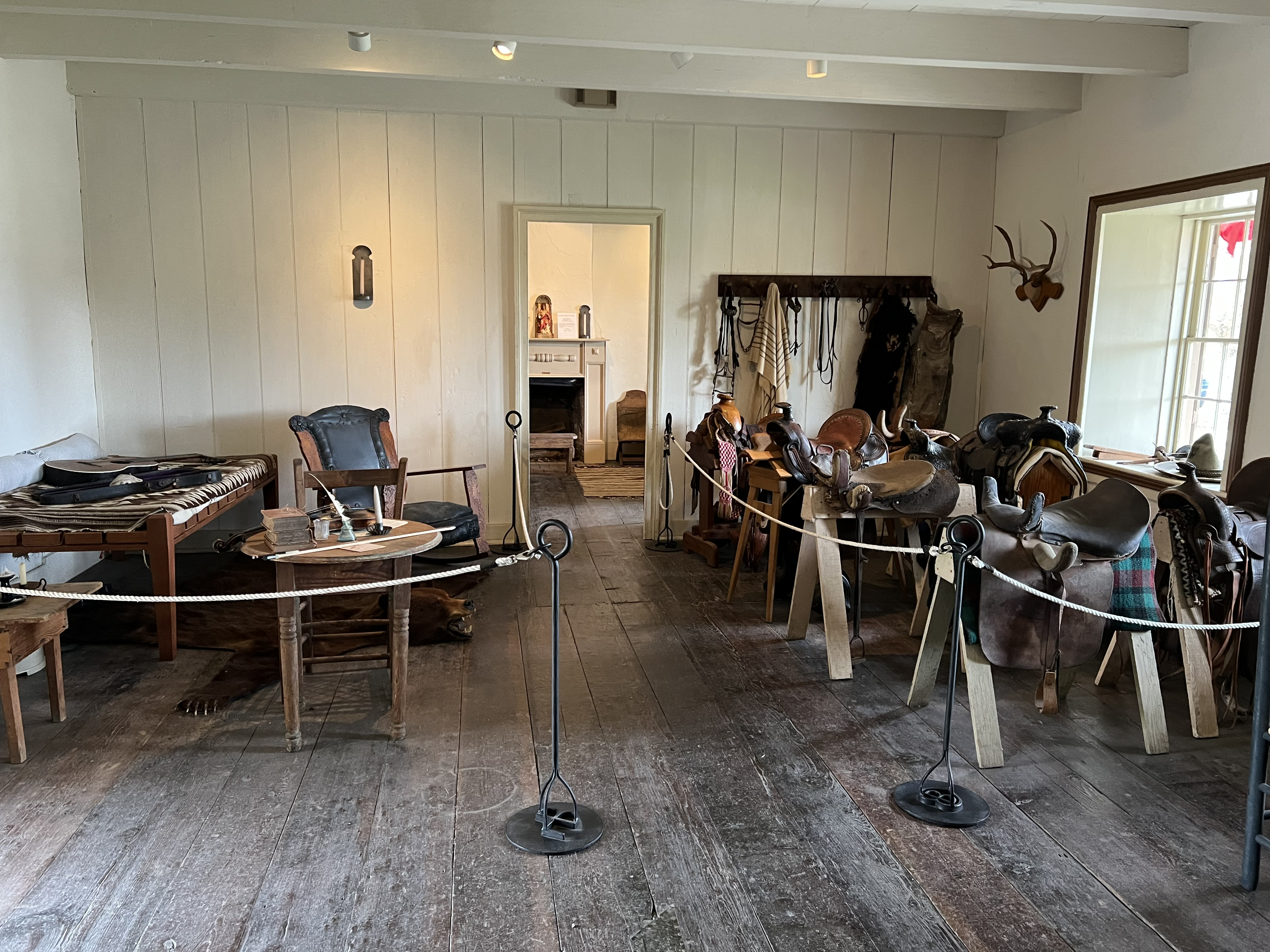

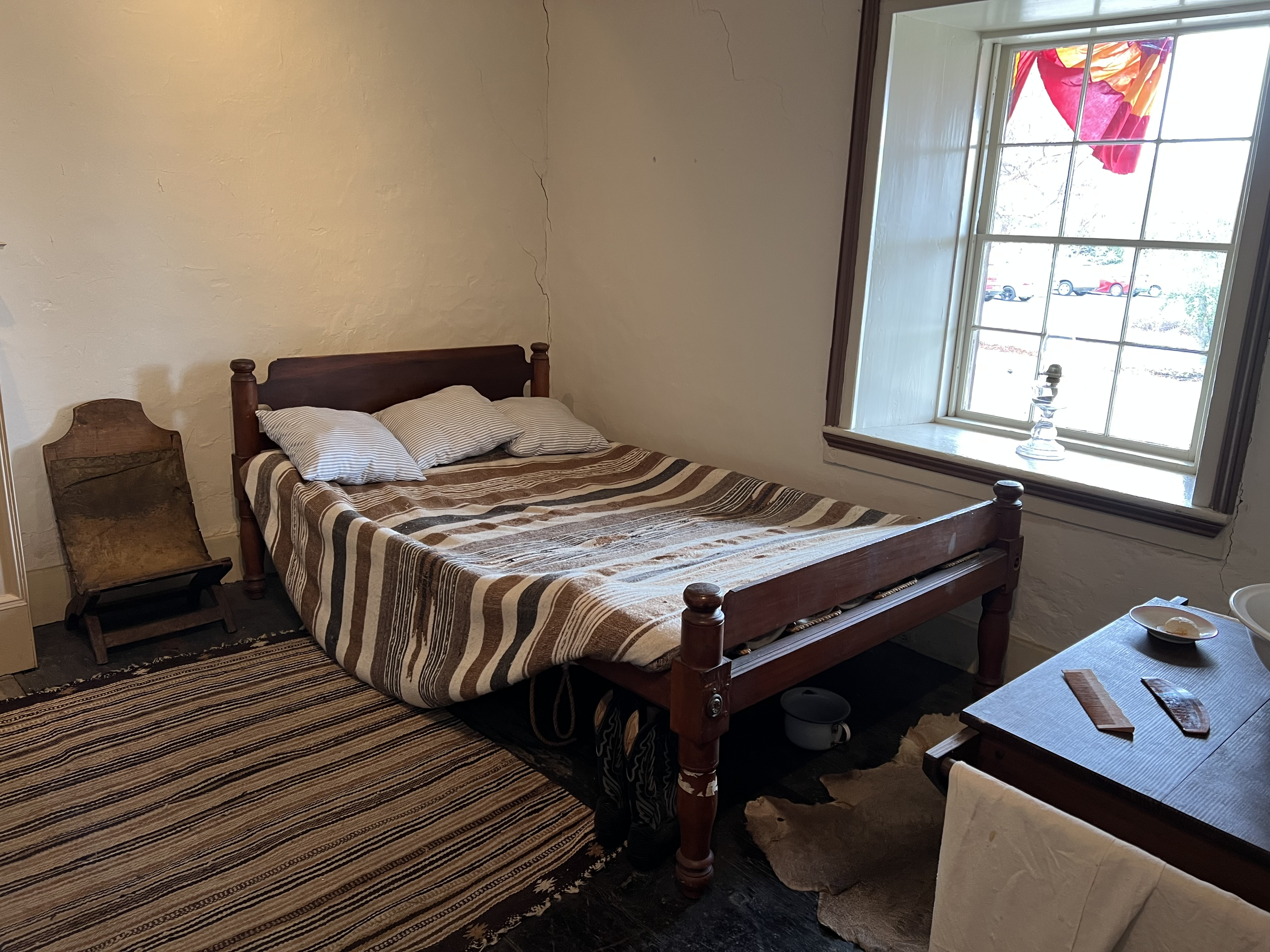

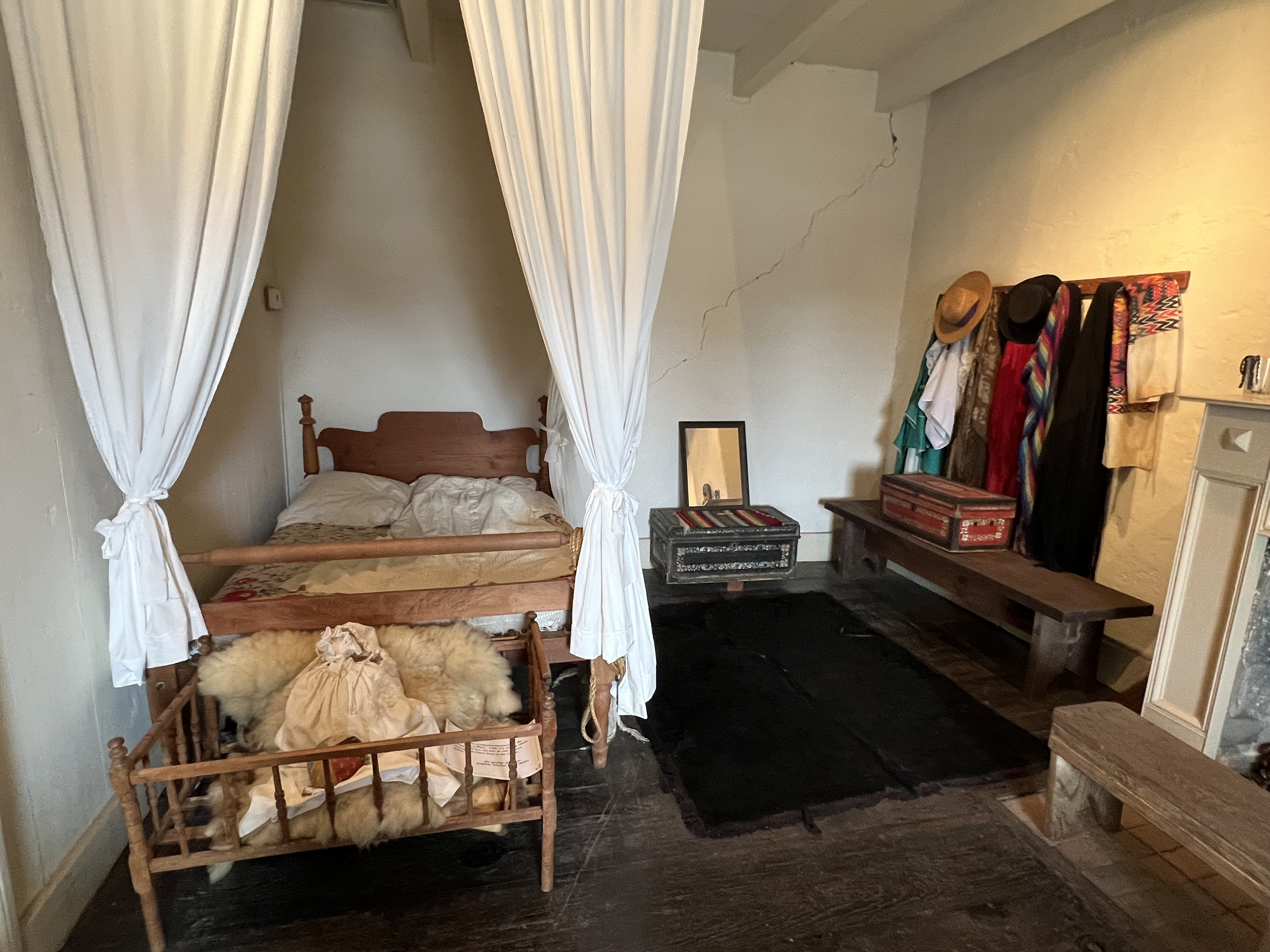

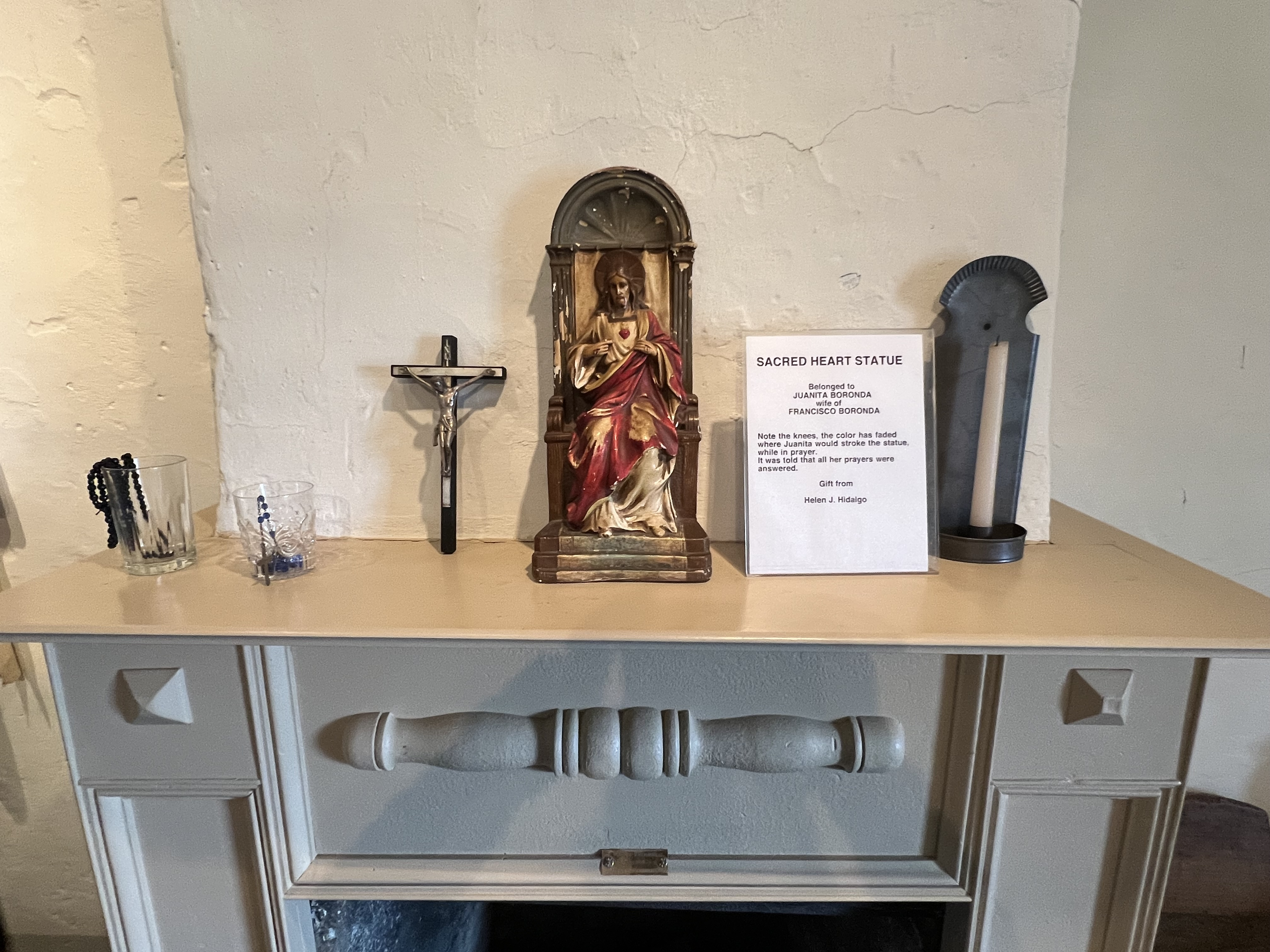

== See also ==
- Ranchos of California
- List of Ranchos of California
- California Historical Landmarks in Santa Clara County
- Lester D. Boronda (1886–1953) painter, furniture designer
