= Beonne Boronda =

American sculptor, educator (1911–2012)

Beonne Drew Boronda
- Born: May 23, 1911; Monterey, California, U.S.
- Died: January 9, 2012 (aged 100); Mystic, Connecticut, U.S.
- Other names: Beonne Boronda Liebig
- Education: Clay Club, Art Students League of New York
- Occupations: Sculptor, educator
- Years active: 1920–2012
- Spouse: Otto E. Liebig (m. 1941–1946; divorce)
- Children: 1
- Father: Lester David Boronda

Beonne Drew Boronda (1911–2012) was an American sculptor, and educator. She was active in the arts in Connecticut and was the president of the Mystic Art Association and founder of the Mystic Outdoor Art Festival. Her father was artist Lester D. Boronda. She primarily lived in New York City, and in Mason's Island near Mystic, Connecticut. She also known by her married name Beonne Boronda Liebig.

== Life and career ==
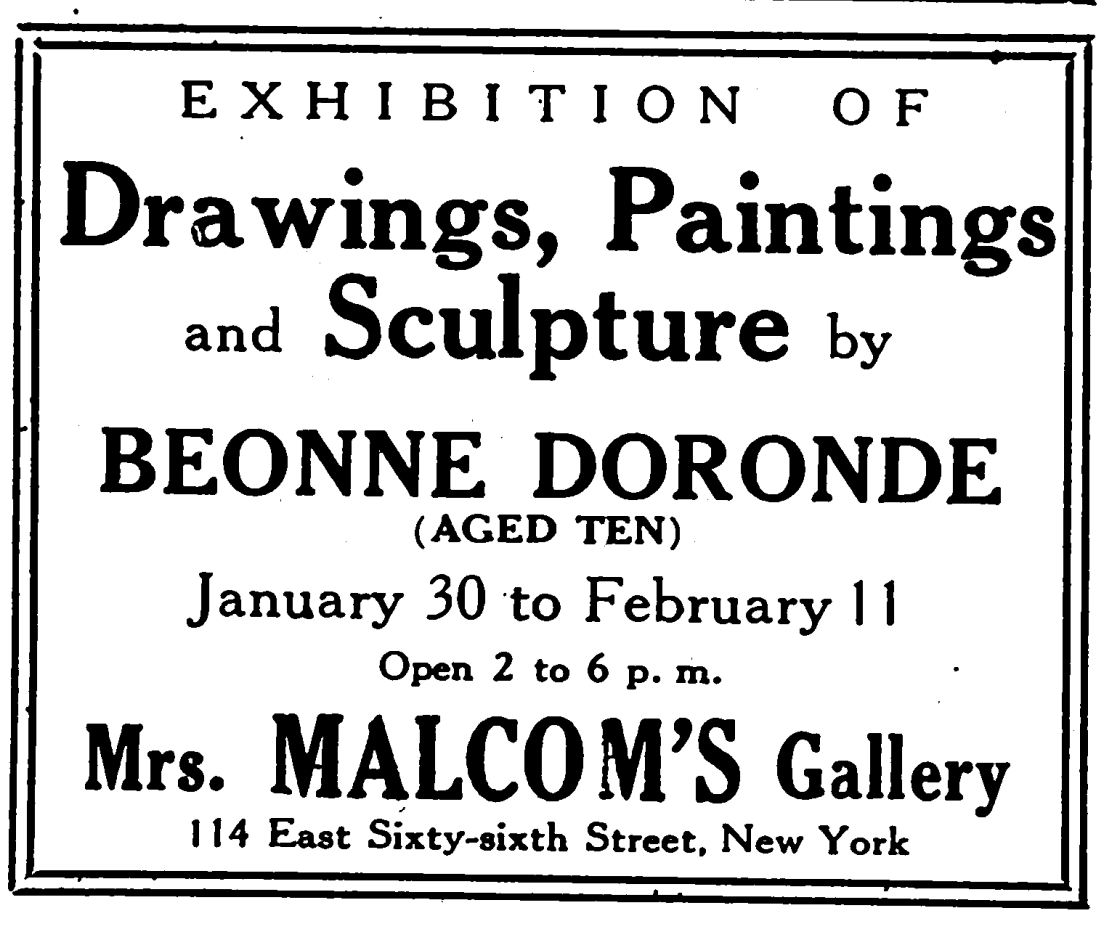
Boronda's (misspelled) solo exhibition in 1921, at Mrs. Malcom's Gallery in New York City

Beonne Drew Boronda was born on May 23, 1911, in Monterey, California. Her mother was Ruby Elizabeth Drew, and her father was noted artist Lester David Boronda. The Boronda family is a prominent Californio family, who were early settlers from Spain in Monterey County, California. Around 1912, the family moved to New York City, where her parents opened a Spanish colonial-style wrought iron furniture and decors store. In 1915, their family bought a property in Mason's Island in Connecticut, as a vacation home. At the age of ten in 1921, she had her first solo exhibition of drawings, paintings and sculptures at Mrs. Malcom's Gallery located at 114 E. 66th Street in New York City.

Boronda studied at the Clay Club (now SculptureCenter), and at the Art Students League of New York. She also studied under artists Dorothea H. Denslow, Frank DuMond, and Arthur Lee.

She and Otto E. Liebig were married in 1941, and they had one daughter. Their marriage ended in divorce in 1946.

She was the president of the Mystic Art Association, and founded the Mystic Outdoor Art Festival. She won various awards for her artwork, including a first place cash prize (1931) from the Clay Club in New York City, for her sculpture "Golden Crested Crane". In 1953, she won an award from the Connecticut Academy of Fine Arts, for her sculpture "Vampire Bat".

In 1947, Boronda had a solo exhibition at Argent Galleries in New York City. She had two exhibitions in 1964; a group exhibition at the Springfield Art League in Springfield, Massachusetts; and a solo exhibition at the Converse Gallery in Norwich, Connecticut.

She died on January 9, 2012, in Mystic.
