= Evan Penny =

South African-Canadian visual artist

- Born: 1953 (age 72–73); South Africa
- Known for: sculptor

Evan Penny (born 1953, in South Africa) is a visual artist based in Toronto, Ontario.

Penny graduated from the Alberta College of Art and Design in 1978. He makes sculptures of human forms out of silicone, pigment, hair and aluminium saying his interest "is to situate the sculptures perceptually between the way we might see each other in real time and space and the way we imagine our equivalent in a photographic representation." Though his creations are lifelike, Penny believes that "the real can't be represented or symbolized."

== Early works ==
Penny’s early figurative sculptures were brought together in Absolutely Unreal, a major survey of the artist’s work that traveled to the Museum London in London, Ontario, the Mendel Art Gallery in Saskatoon, Saskatchewan and the Glenbow Museum in Calgary, Alberta (2003–2006).

== No One - In Particular (2004–2007) ==
No One – In Particular is a grouping of twice life-size sculptures that are imaginary portraits constructed to look like ordinary people but with larger parts of the body, accentuating the variability in the human form.

== Stretch / Anamorphs (2003–2008) ==
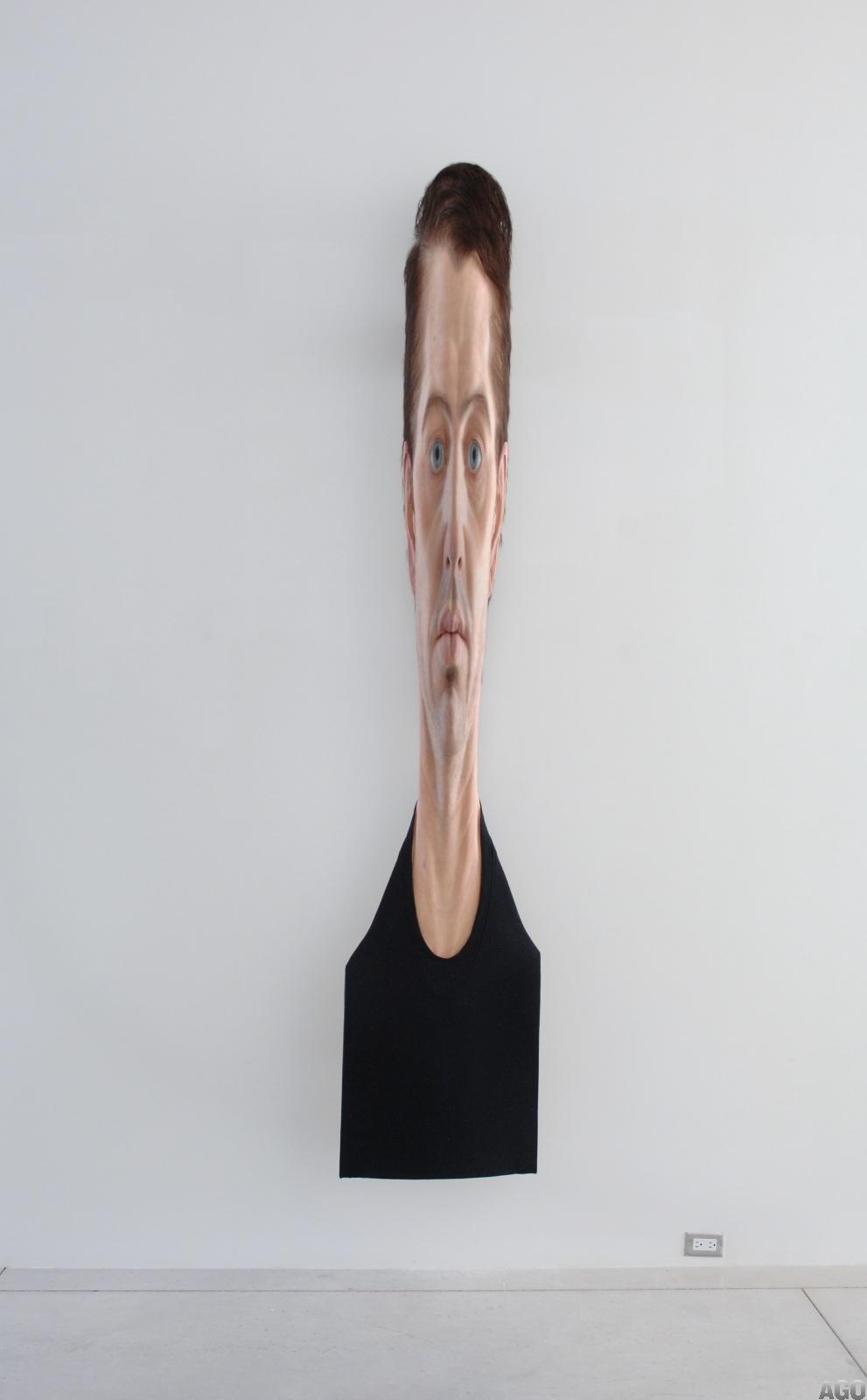
Stretch #1

Penny’s Stretch and Anamorph sculptures stretch, blur and manipulate the human form in space. In works such as Stretch #1 2003, Penny’s traditional busts are vertically stretched elongating the head and shoulders.

Penny’s Panagiota works visually chart a conversation Penny had with a young woman by rendering her facial expression at different points in their conversation.

== Backs (2004–2008) ==
Penny created a series of hyper-real sculptures of the backs of individuals.

== Recent works ==
In 2011, Penny created his largest sculpture to date, Jim Revisited, a 10 foot tall man with a commanding presence. As the model for this new sculpture Penny revisited his 1985 piece, Jim, a diminutive 4/5 life-size sculpture positioned in a contrapposto stance.

== Exhibitions ==
- 2011: Evan Penny. Re Figured, Kunsthalle Tübingen, later on Museum der Moderne Salzburg and Art Gallery of Ontario, Toronto
- 2012–2013: Lifelike, group show originated at the Walker Art Center, traveling to the New Orleans Museum of Art, the Museum of Contemporary Art, San Diego, and Blanton Museum of Art in Austin, Texas

== Awards ==
- 1997 Victor Martyn Lynch-Staunton Award from the Canada Council.
