= Rancho Rincón del Sanjón =

Mexican land grant in California

Coordinates: 36.710°N 121.690°W

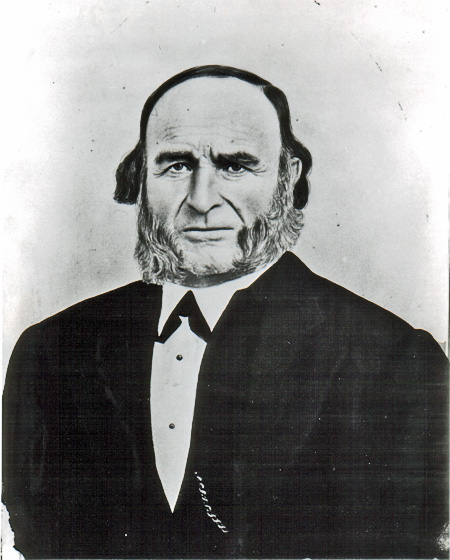
Rancho Rincón del Sanjón was granted to José Eusebio Boronda, a Californio ranchero. The present day community of Boronda is named for him and located on the former grounds of the rancho.

Rancho Rincón del Sanjón was a 2,230-acre (9.0 km^{2}) Mexican land grant in present-day Monterey County, California given in 1840 by Governor Juan B. Alvarado to José Eusebio Boronda. The name means "corner of Sanjo del Alisal". The grant was located on the north side of the Sanjo del Alisal, (the great slough, or deep ditch, of the alisal), between Cooper's Rancho Bolsa del Potrero y Moro Cojo on the west, Castro's Rancho Sausal on the east, and bordering Espinosa's Rancho Bolsa de las Escorpinas on the north. The grant was on the northwest of present-day Salinas, where Boronda, California is located.

== History ==
The Boronda family patriarch, Manuel Boronda (1750-1826) accompanied Junípero Serra’s second expedition to Alta California. By 1790, Boronda was stationed at the Presidio of San Francisco and married Maria Gertrudis Higuera (1776-). Besides his military duties, which included carpenter work, Manuel also conducted a class for boys. The couple then moved to Santa Cruz. In 1811, at age 61, Manuel retired from military service and with his family moved to Monterey, where he built an adobe house in 1817. The three sons of Manuel and Gertrudis Boronda were: José Canuto Boronda (1792-); José Eusebio Boronda (1808-1880); and José Manuel Boronda (1803-1878), grantee of Rancho Los Laureles.

José Eusebio Boronda married Maria Josefa Buelna (1817-1864) in 1831. Maria Buelna was the daughter of Antonio Buelna, grantee of Rancho San Francisquito and Rancho San Gregorio. Boronda served as Mayordomo of Rancho Los Vergeles. In 1839, Boronda and his family settled on a one and one half square league, "mas o menos" ("more or less"), Rancho Rincón del Sanjón which he called San José, and which he was granted in 1840. Boronda was at the Battle of Natividad in 1846.

With the cession of California to the United States following the Mexican-American War, the 1848 Treaty of Guadalupe Hidalgo provided that the land grants would be honored. As required by the Land Act of 1851, a claim for Rancho Rincón del Sanjón was filed with the Public Land Commission in 1853, and the grant was patented to José Eusebio Boronda in 1860.

== Historic sites of the Rancho ==
- Jose Eusebio Boronda Adobe. The home of José Eusebio Boronda built between 1844 and 1848.

== See also ==
- Ranchos of California
- List of Ranchos of California
