= Salinas City Elementary School District =

School district in California

Coordinates: 36.6644°N 121.6579°W

Salinas City Elementary

Address
- 840 South Main Street Salinas, California, 93901; United States

District information
- Type: Public School District
- Motto: Students are the focus of our work
- Grades: K–6
- Superintendent: Rebeca Andrade
- NCES District ID: 0633930

Students and staff
- Students: 8,271 (2020–2021)
- Teachers: 343.0 (FTE)
- Staff: 450.97 (FTE)
- Student–teacher ratio: 24.11:1

Other information
- Website: salinascityesd.org

Salinas City Elementary is an elementary school district located in Salinas, California. As of 2015, Salinas City Elementary had an enrollment of about 9,000 students, of which 80% were Hispanic or Latino. Salinas City Elementary has 13 campuses and employs ~800 classified and certificated employees, making the district one of the largest employers in Salinas, CA.

Salinas City Elementary School District is one of 96 California school districts that has advanced to the federal Title I Program Improvement (PI) Year 3 status based upon failure to make Adequate Yearly Progress (AYP) for at least five years and is now subject to corrective action and targeted technical assistance as specified by the federal law.

== Demographics ==
Ethnicity	District	State
Hispanic or Latino	80%	48%
White, not Hispanic	12%	30%
Filipino	3%	3%
African American, Not Hispanic	3%	8%
Asian	2%	8%
Pacific Islander	<1%	<1%
American Indian or Alaska Native	<1%	<1%
Multiple or No Response	<1%	<2%

* Source: California State Board of Education, 2005-2006

Roughly 95% of the district's students speak Spanish, with half speaking English as a second language.

== Foundation ==
The Salinas City Elementary School Education Foundation was founded in 2005 by concerned community members to raise funds to provide Salinas City Elementary students with music, technology, and art education because the State of California's budgeting had eliminated these opportunities.

== Board of trustees ==
Member	Area
Roberto Garcia	Area 1
Francisco Javier Estrada	Area 2
Robert Foster Hoffman	Area 3
Amy Ish	Area 4
Stephen Kim	Area 5

Regular Meeting Times: Second Monday of the month, 840 S. Main St., Salinas.

== Campuses ==
School	Website	Grades	Mascot	Principal	Notes
Baldwin Continuation		4 - 6			Closed '07-'08
Boronda DIAS		K - 3	Pumas	Mary Pritchard	
Boronda Meadows		K - 6	Hawks	Susana Mancera-Juárez	
El Gabilan		K - 6	Hawks	Esabel Cervantes	
Henry F. Kammann		K - 6	Panthers	Leticia García	
Laurel Wood		K - 6	Dolphins	Al Velasquez	Distinguished School Award 2002
Lincoln		K - 6	Leopards	Juan Chaidez	
Loma Vista		K - 6	Super Stars	Katherine Venza-Balesteri	
Los Padres		K - 6	Panthers	Claudia Morales	
Mission Park		K - 6	Mustangs	Jennifer Zanzot	
Monterey Park		K - 6	Eagles	Brian Hays	
Natividad		K - 6	Golden Eagles	Susano Marquez	
Roosevelt		K - 6	Bears	Hilda Huerta	Founded as "West End School". Notable alumni: John Steinbeck.
Sherwood		K - 6	Sharks	Everardo Marquez	
University Park		K - 6	Panthers	Anna Padilla	Distinguished School Award 2000
