= Rana Creek Preserve =

Nature preserve in Monterey County, California

- IUCN category V (protected landscape/seascape)
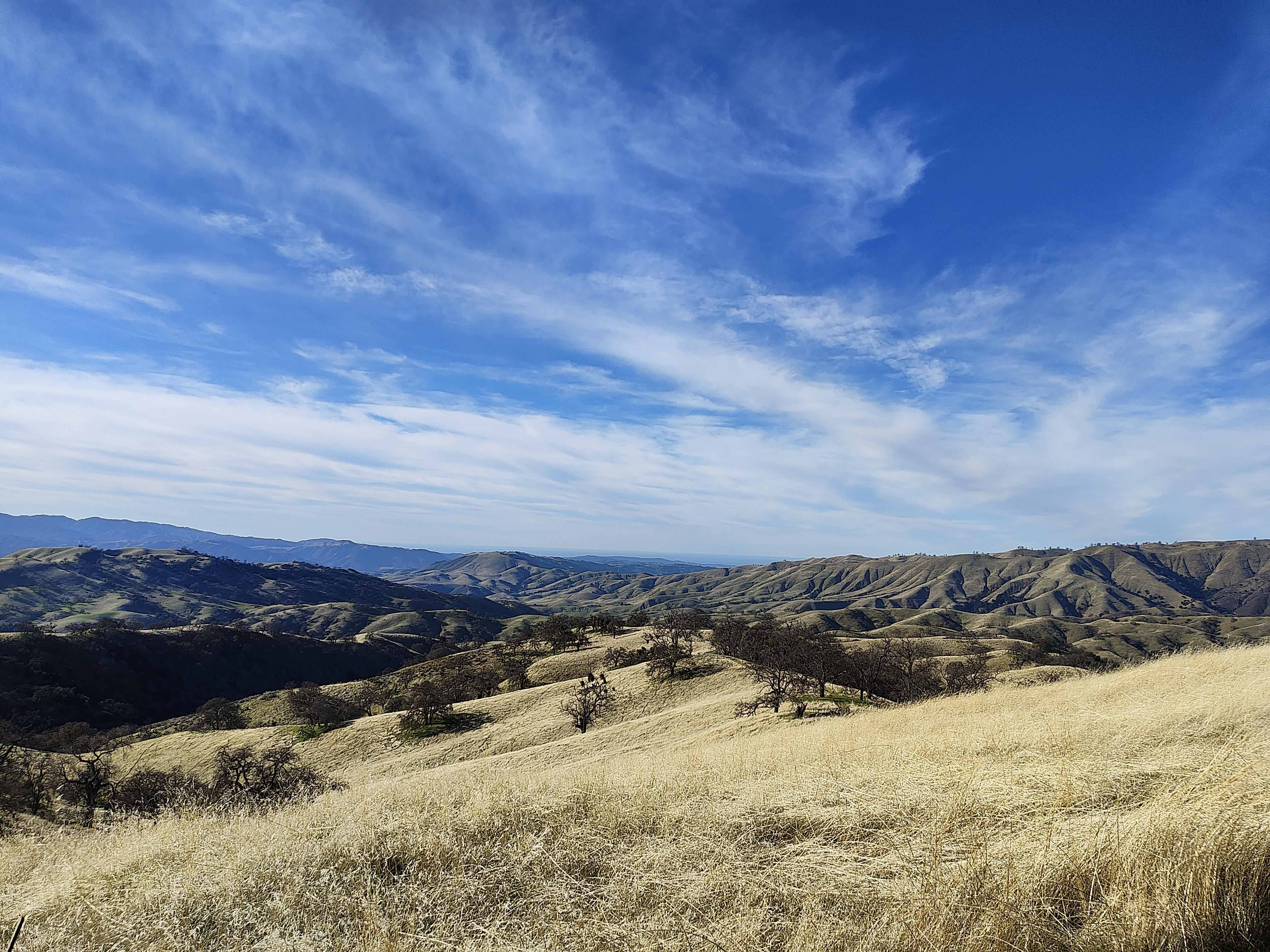
- Upper Carmel Valley

- Location within California
- Interactive map of Rana Creek Preserve
- Location: Monterey County, California
- Nearest city: Monterey, California
- Coordinates: 36°26′24″N 121°38′7″W
- Area: 12,452 acres (5,039 ha)
- Max. elevation: 3,400 ft (1,000 m)
- Min. elevation: 500 ft (150 m)
- Created: 2023
- Operator: The Wildlands Conservancy
- Website: Rana Creek Preserve

Rana Creek Preserve is a nature preserve in Monterey County, California, owned and managed by The Wildlands Conservancy, a nonprofit land trust. It is part of the organization’s system of protected lands (see List of The Wildlands Conservancy preserves). The preserve takes its name from Rana Creek, a tributary of Tularcitos Creek, which flows into the Carmel River and ultimately Monterey Bay.

== Geography ==
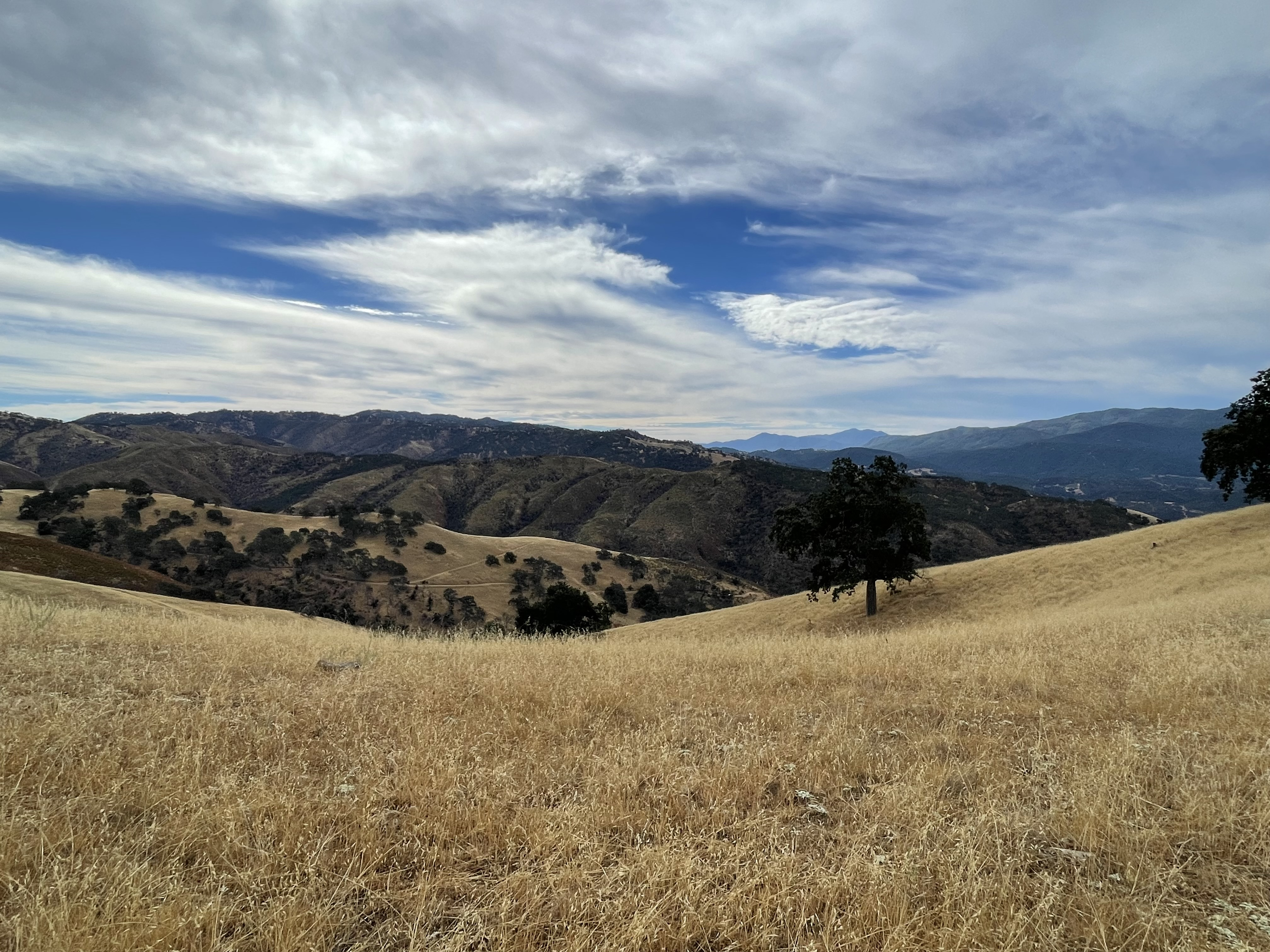
Rolling ridges

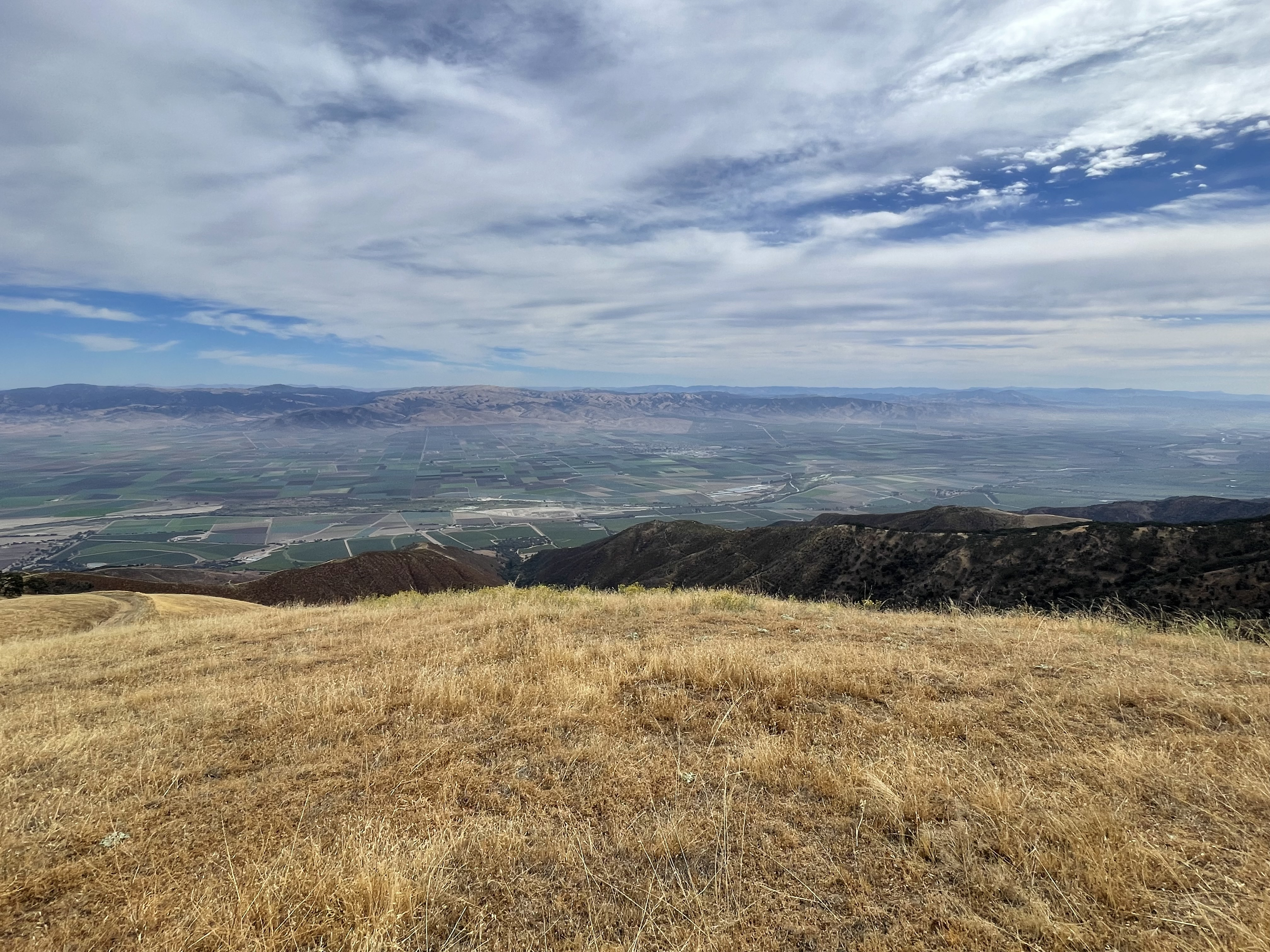
View toward the Salinas Valley

The property extends across the western flank of the Sierra de Salinas, from Carmel Valley Road north to the Salinas Valley. Elevations range from about 500 feet (150 m) to more than 3,400 feet (1,000 m), with ridgetops overlooking the Salinas Valley. Rana Creek itself is a 7.6 miles (12.2 km) tributary of Tularcitos Creek, named for its abundance of frogs (rana is Spanish for frog). The watershed includes numerous springs, seasonal creeks, and vernal pools formed by faulting along the Tularcitos Fault.

Habitats range from oak woodlands and chaparral to grasslands, wetlands, and riparian corridors. The preserve contains more than 16 miles of ranch roads and trails.

== Flora and fauna ==
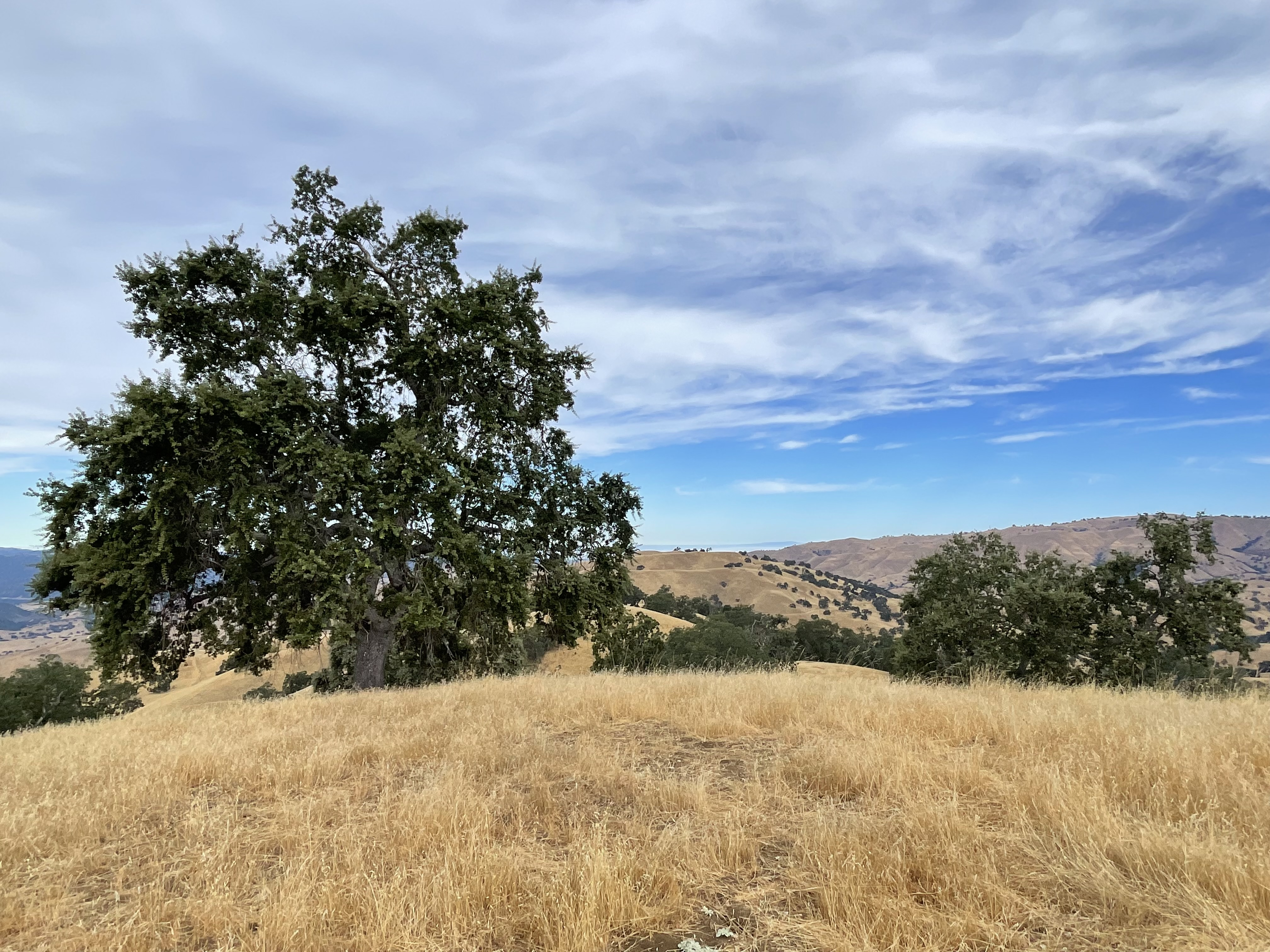
Oak tree

The vernal pools host western toads, chorus frogs, and other amphibians, while federally protected species on the property include the California red-legged frog and California tiger salamander. Birdlife includes golden eagles and Swainson’s hawks. Other mammals documented include black bears (Ursus americanus) and puma (Puma concolor).

Valley oaks and native grasslands are prominent, though historic grazing has suppressed oak regeneration in some areas.

== History ==
The lands of Rana Creek were originally inhabited by the Esselen people and later became part of the Mexican-era Rancho Tularcitos land grant. The property remained a working cattle ranch into the 21st century and was subdivided into parcels under the Williamson Act.

In 1982, Apple co-founder Mike Markkula and his wife Linda purchased 9,000 acres of the ranch for $8 million, later adding surrounding parcels and building a conference center and airstrip. Markkula listed the property for sale multiple times from 2013 onward, with asking prices up to $60 million.

On July 28, 2023, the Wildlands Conservancy acquired the ranch for $35 million to establish a public preserve. Funding included $24 million from the California Wildlife Conservation Board, $2 million from the State Coastal Conservancy, $2.5 million from Wildlands, and a $6.5 million loan from the Markkulas. Without the purchase, zoning would have allowed development into dozens of home sites.

In 2025, The Wildlands Conservancy and the State Coastal Conservancy completed the return of 1,720 acres (700 ha) at the headwaters of Tularcitos Creek to the Esselen Tribe of Monterey County, funded with $8.6 million in state grants.

== Conservation ==
Conservation priorities at the preserve include vernal pools, oak regeneration, and wildlife corridors between the Salinas Valley and Los Padres National Forest. Cattle grazing continues on parts of the preserve.

== Recreation ==
As of 2026 the preserve remains closed except by permission. The conservancy has hosted monthly volunteer days and seasonal guided hikes in partnership with community groups.

== Education and programs ==
Local nonprofits have arranged docent-led tours and school field programs. Outreach presentations on restoration at Rana Creek have been hosted by the California Native Plant Society Monterey Bay Chapter.

== Works ==
- "Carmel Valley's Newest Preserve and Kern County's Tule Elk". OpenRoad. Episode 92. April 7, 2024. NBC Bay Area. OpenRoad had editorial control. The Wildlands Conservancy funded the episode.

== See also ==
- List of The Wildlands Conservancy preserves
