= Tularcitos Creek (Carmel River tributary) =

Stream in Monterey County, California

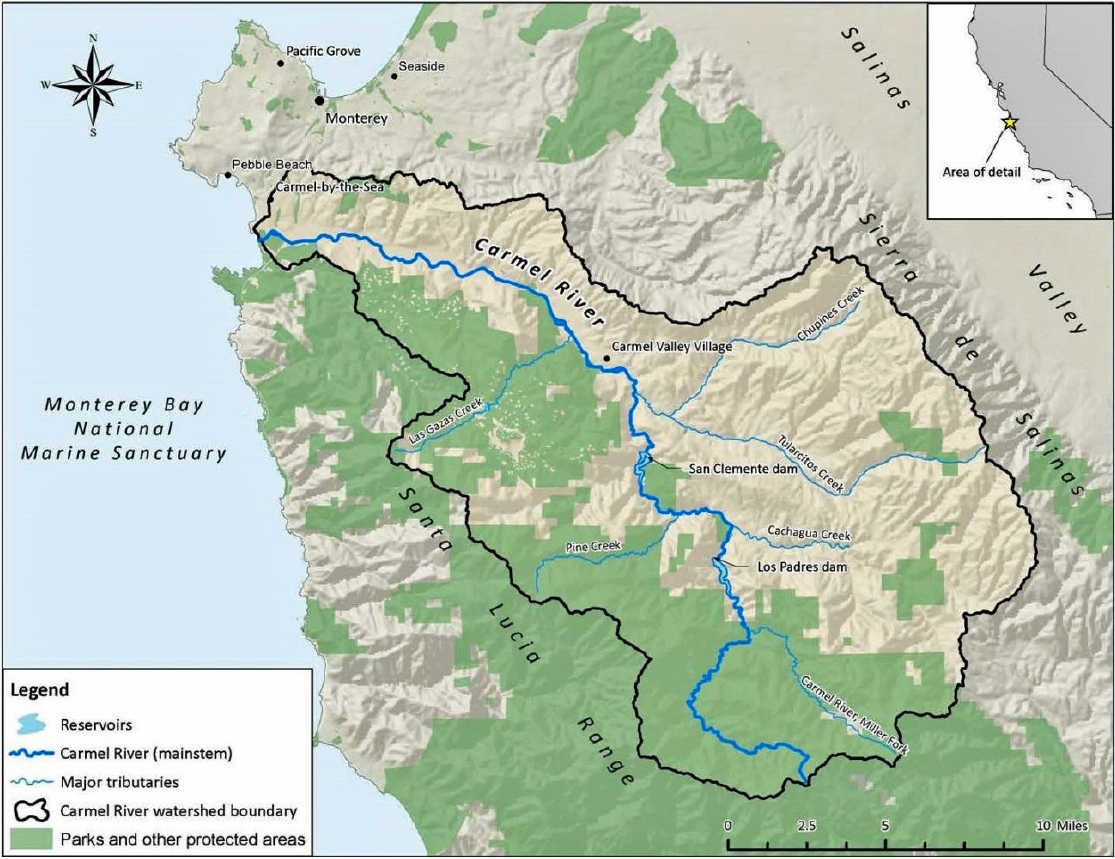
- Carmel River Watershed Map with major tributaries, National Marine Fisheries Service 2013

- Location of the mouth of Tularcitos Creek in Carmel Valley, California

Location
- Country: United States
- State: California
- Region: Monterey County
- Municipality: Carmel Valley, California

Physical characteristics
- Source: Western flank of Sierra de Salinas
  - coordinates: 36°28′11″N 121°31′59″W
  - elevation: 3,300 ft (1,000 m)
- Mouth: Confluence with the Carmel River
  - location: Carmel Valley, California
  - coordinates: 36°27′52″N 121°42′51″W
  - elevation: 318 ft (97 m)

Basin features
- Tributaries
  - right: Rana Creek, Chupines Creek

Tularcitos Creek is a 15.8-mile-long (25.4 km) stream flowing initially south, then west, then northwest, to its confluence with the Carmel River in Carmel Valley, Monterey County, California.

== History ==
Before the arrival of Spanish colonists, the Tularcitos Creek watershed was part of the homeland of the Esselen indigenous peoples.

Tularcitos Creek's name is derived from a chain of small ponds with abundant tules (Schoenoplectus acutus var. occidentalis) that grow along its lower reaches. A place called Tularcitos in mentioned in a 1828 report along with Laureles (likely Rancho Los Laureles) and Chupines. On Jan. 8, 1831 the Tularcitos name was given to a land grant, which became Rancho Tularcitos in 1834. On a 1832 diseño for Rancho Los Tularcitos the creek is labelled Arroyo de la Noria ("noria" being Spanish for water wheel). On an 1888 map it was labelled Ardilla Creek ("ardilla" being Spanish for "squirrel" likely the California ground squirrel Otospermophilus beecheyi). The Chupines Creek tributary may have been named for black cottonwood (Populus trichocarpa) for which the Spanish word is "chopo". In 1828 an Arroyo de los Chupines is mentioned and a report by Father Sarría and Father José Ramón Abella of the Carmel Mission described the "Cañada of the Tularcitos" where "one comes upon timbers, laurels, chupines, and tularcitos." The Rana Creek tributary is likely named for its abundant frogs for which the Spanish word is "rana".

== Watershed ==
The Tularcitos Creek watershed, including the Rana Creek and Chupines Creek subwatersheds, drains 15 square miles (39 km^{2}). In contrast to the high flow from the Carmel River's tributaries in the Santa Lucia Range, the combined flow from the Tularcitos, Rana, and Chupines subwatersheds of the Sierra de Salinas produces only 4% of the annual discharge of the Carmel River, although occupying 23% of the linear distance of whole watershed. Lying in the northeastern portion of the Carmel River watershed, Tularcitos Creek has low rainfall and thus low sediment loads, although occasional major storms can deliver significant sediment loads. The creek follows the Tularcitos Fault which runs northwest from the Sierra de Salinas past the Monterey Peninsula and beneath Monterey Bay to about 3.7 miles (6.0 km) southwest of Santa Cruz, California.

There are two main southwest-flowing tributaries of Tularcitos Creek, 7.6 miles (12.2 km)-long Rana Creek and 8.8 miles (14.2 km)-long Chupines Creek. These enter Tularcitos Creek 6.6 miles (10.6 km) and 2.0 miles (3.2 km) (stream miles) upstream from the Tularcitos Creek confluence with the Carmel River, respectively.

== Ecology ==
Federally threatened South-Central California Coast Steelhead trout (Onchorhynchus mykiss) occasionally spawn and rear in the Tularcitos Creek.

The upper watershed, including the 7.6-mile Rana Creek tributary, is largely protected within Rana Creek Preserve. For details on the preserve and its land acquisition history, see that article.

== See also ==
- Sierra de Salinas
- Carmel River
