= California Coastal Conservancy =

State agency to improve coastal resources

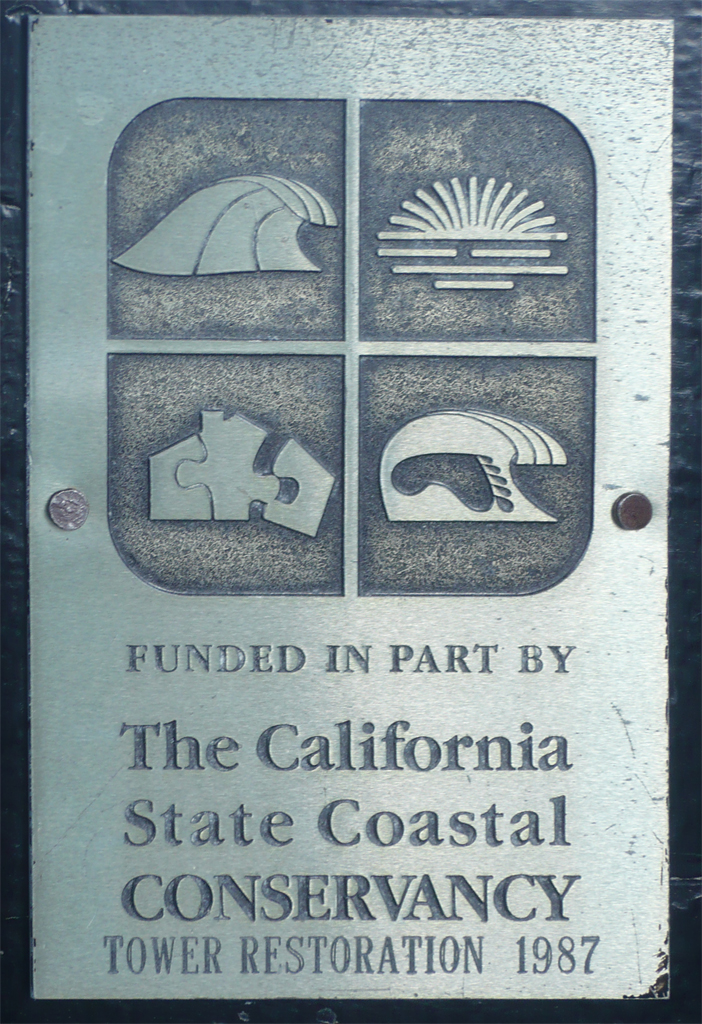
- Plaque at Battery Point Lighthouse, in the tower with the light. Plaque reads: "Tower Restoration 1987. Funded in part by The California State Coastal Conservancy"

Agency overview
- Headquarters: Oakland, California
- Employees: 70
- Annual budget: $384m USD (2022)
- Agency executive: Amy Hutzel, Executive Officer
- Parent department: California Natural Resources Agency
- Website: https://scc.ca.gov/

The California State Coastal Conservancy (CSCC, SCC) is a non-regulatory state agency in California established in 1976 to enhance coastal resources and public access to the coast. The CSCC is a department of the California Natural Resources Agency. The agency's work is conducted along the entirety of the California coast, including the interior San Francisco Bay and is responsible for the planning and coordination of federal land sales to acquire into state land as well as award grant funding for improvement projects. The Board of Directors for the agency is made up of seven members who are appointed by the Governor of California and approved by the California Legislature, members of the California State Assembly and California State Senate engage and provide oversight within their legislative capacity.

== Goals ==
The agency's official goals are to:

- Protect and improve coastal wetlands, streams, and watersheds
- Improve access to coasts and shores by building trails and stairways and improving the availability of low cost accommodation including campgrounds and hostels
- Work with local communities to revitalize urban watersheds
- Assist in resolving complex land-use problems
- Purchase and hold environmentally valuable coastal and bay lands
- Protect Agricultural lands and support coastal agriculture
- Accept donations and dedication of land and easements for public access, wildlife habitat, agriculture and open spaces

Since its establishment, the Conservancy has completed over 4,000 projects along the California coastline and San Francisco Bay, restored over 400,000 acres of coastal habitat, built hundreds of miles of new trail including the Bay Area Ridge Trail, Santa Ana Parkway Trail, and partnered on over 100 urban waterfront projects. The Conservancy has spent over $1.8 billion on projects. It works in partnership with other public agencies, nonprofit organizations and private landowners, employing 75 people and overseeing a current annual budget of 53 million dollars. The Conservancy was created by the legislature as a unique entity with flexible powers to serve as an intermediary among government, citizens, and the private sector in recognition that creative approaches would be needed to preserve California's coastline.

The Conservancy provides technical assistance and grant funding to local communities, nonprofit organizations, other government agencies, businesses, and private landowners to implement multi-benefit projects that:

- Protect the natural and scenic beauty of the coast
- Enhance wildlife habitat help the public to get to and enjoy beaches and parklands
- Keep farmland and timberlands in production
- Improve water quality
- Revitalize working waterfronts
- Prepare communities for the impacts of climate change

== Projects ==
The conservancy has completed more than 2,400 projects along the California coastline and in the San Francisco bay. These projects have included preserving almost 20,000 acres (81 km^{2}) of wetlands, dunes, wildlife habitat, recreation lands, farmland, and scenic open space, building hundreds of miles of access ways and trails along the coastline, and assisting in the completion of more than 100 urban waterfront projects. The Conservancy has hundreds of ongoing projects including:

=== California Coastal Trail ===
Once completed, the California Coastal Trail (CCT) will extend 1,200 miles (1,900 km) from Oregon to Mexico, making it one of the longest trails in the United States. While informal trails along our coast have been used for centuries, CCT was initiated in 1972 when Californians passed Proposition 20 recommending that a trails system be established along or near the coast. In 1999, the CCT was designated at the state and federal level as Millennium Legacy Trail, and in 2001 state legislation called for its completion. Roughly half of the CCT was complete in 2009.

Enacted in 1976, the State Coastal Conservancy Act (Division 21 Section 31000 et al. of the Public Resources Code) calls for the Coastal Conservancy to have a principal role in the implementation of a system of public accessways to and along the state's coastline, including development of the CCT. The Coastal Conservancy pursues this mandate in part by awarding grants to public agencies and nonprofit organizations to acquire land, or any interest therein, or to develop, operate, or manage lands for public access purposes to and along the coast, on terms and conditions the Coastal Conservancy specifies. In addition, the Coastal Conservancy works with other state agencies including the California Department of Parks and Recreation and the Coastal Commission to coordinate trail development.

In 2001, the Governor signed Senate Bill 908 directing the Coastal Conservancy to report back to the Legislature on progress made completing the trail. In 2003, the “Completing the California Coastal Trail” Report described the status of the trail and outlined strategies for its completion. SB 908 also directed the Coastal Conservancy to provide grants and assistance to establish and expand inland trail systems that may be linked to the trail, and directed agencies with property interests or regulatory authority in coastal areas to cooperate with the Coastal Conservancy with respect to planning and making lands available for completion of the trail.

In 2007, the Governor signed SB 1396 directing the Coastal Conservancy to coordinate development of the Coastal Trail with the Caltrans. This bill also required local transportation planning agencies whose jurisdiction includes a portion of the Coastal Trail, or property designated for the trail to coordinate with the Coastal Conservancy, Coastal Commission, and Caltrans regarding development of the trail.

=== Napa Sonoma Marsh Restoration Project ===
The U.S. Army Corps of Engineers, the Conservancy, and the California Department of Fish and Game conducted a feasibility study and preparing an Environmental Impact Report / Environmental Impact Statement (EIR/EIS), which involves the technical Analysis of Alternatives for the restoration of 10,000 acres (40 km^{2}) of wetlands and associated habitats within the former Cargill salt pond complex in the North Bay.

The goals of this project are to restore large patches of tidal marsh that support a wide variety of fish, wildlife and plants, including special status mammals and water birds – specifically the salt marsh harvest mouse, California clapper rail, and black rail, endangered fish – specifically the delta smelt, Sacramento splittail, steelhead trout and Chinook salmon, and aquatic animals. They will also be managing water depth to maximize wildlife habitat diversity, with shallow-water areas for migratory and resident shore birds and deep-water areas for diving ducks.

=== Carmel River Reroute and San Clemente Dam Removal Project ===
The project involves the Conservancy, National Marine Fisheries Service (NMFS), the Conservation League Foundation and the Californian American Water company (CalAm) working together to remove the San Clemente Dam. Since the dams construction in 1921, the Carmel River has suffered from accelerated erosion, and the once vibrant steelhead trout run has dramatically decreased.

The benefits of the dam removal include recovery of central coast steelhead trout (a threatened species) by proving unimpaired access to over 25 miles (40 km) of spawning and rearing habitat, expansion of public recreation by preserving over 900 acres (3.6 km^{2}) of coastal watershed lands, restoration of a natural sediment regime improving the habitat for steelhead trout, reducing beach erosion that now contributes to destabilization of homes, roads and infrastructure, and improvement of habitat for the threatened California red-legged frog.

The total project cost for the project is estimated at $83 million. According to the implementation agreement, CalAm will pay an amount equivalent to the estimated cost of buttressing the dam, or approximately $49 million. The Conservancy, with assistance from the NMFS, will secure the additional $34 million from state, federal, and private foundation sources. Construction of the project is expected to take three years – activities will be restricted to approximately April to November to avoid the rainy season and impact to migrating steelhead. During years two and three of construction, the Carmel River and San Clemente Creek will be diverted around the reservoir and dam site, and the reservoir will be emptied.

=== Integrated Watershed Restoration Program (IWRP) ===
The Integrated Watershed Restoration Program (IWRP; pronounced "I Werp") for Santa Cruz County was formed in 2002 as a county-wide effort to prioritize watershed restoration. The IWRP's objectives are to:

- Coordinate agencies on the identification, funding and implementation of watershed restoration projects
- Target proposals to critical projects supported by the resource agencies
- Facilitate higher quality designs at lower costs
- Simplify the permit process for watershed restoration
- Effect institutional change to improve watershed restoration efforts
- Develop a countywide outreach and education program
- Develop a monitoring program geared toward future project identification needs
- Develop additional assessments and plans
- Serve as a water restoration information hub for Santa Cruz county.

The Conservancy awarded $4.5 million to the Resource Conservation District of Santa Cruz County in June 2003 to initiate Phase 1 of the IWRP focused on pre-implementation activities including designs and permits for nearly 100 critical watershed restoration projects in Santa Cruz County including expansion of rural roads, technical assistance programs, comparative lagoon ecological assessment projects, countywide outreach and education program development, watershed education activity and resource guides, and coordination of resources: annual watershed partner forum, reporting, website and technical assistance.

=== South Bay Salt Pond Restoration Project ===
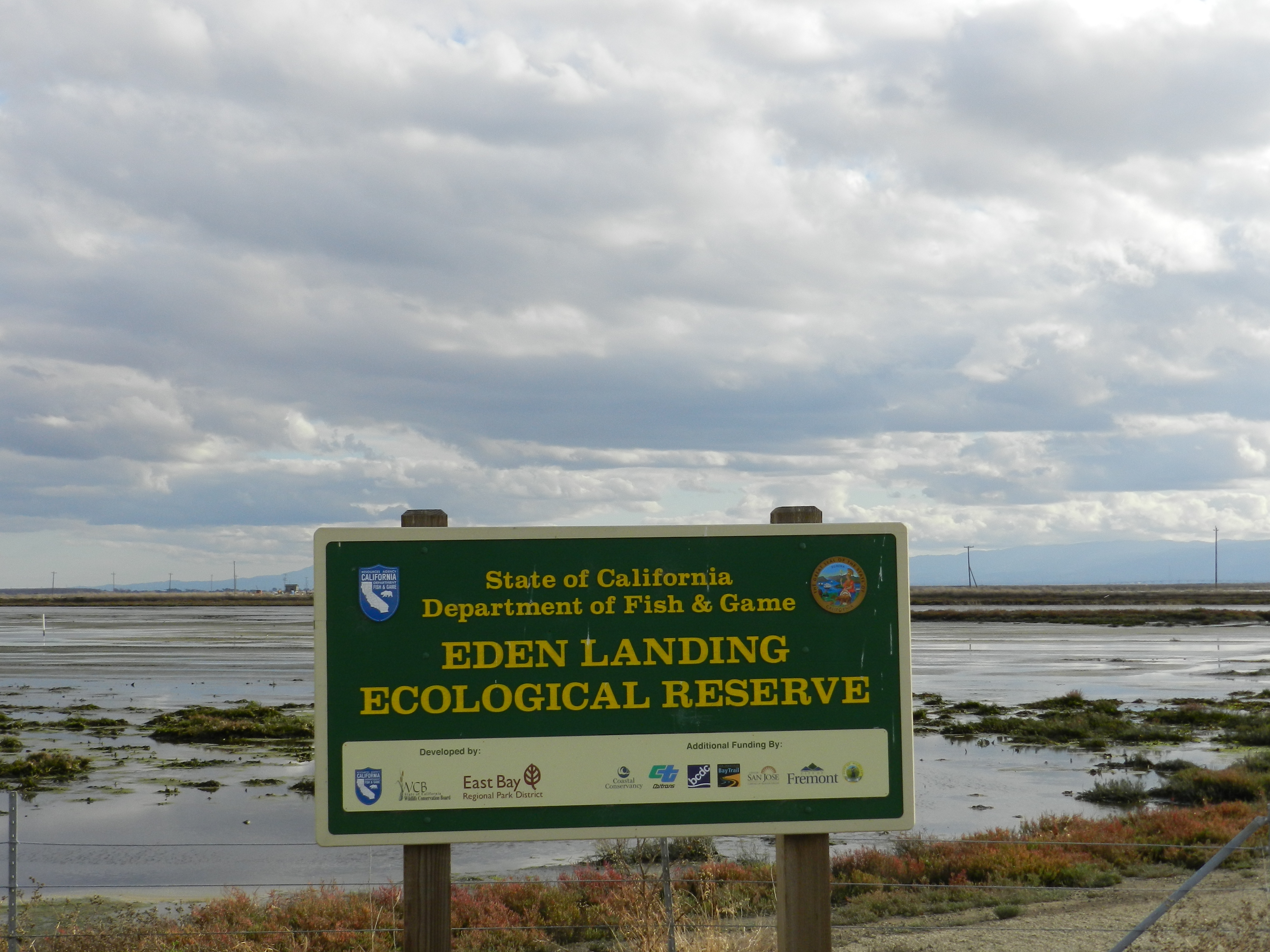
Eden Landing Ecological Reserve San Francisco Bay Area

The project is being headed by the state of California and the federal government to restore 15,100 acres (61 km^{2}) of Cargill's former salt ponds in San Francisco Bay. In October 2000, Cargill proposed to consolidate its operations and sell lands and salt production rights on 61 percent of its South Bay Operation area. Negotiations were headed by Senator Dianne Feinstein and a framework agreement was signed in May 2002 by the conservancy, the California Resources Agency, the Wildlife Conservation Board, the California Department of Fish and Game, United States Fish and Wildlife Service, Cargill and Senator Feinstein. California approved the purchase of the property on February 11, 2003.

=== Invasive Spartina Project ===
The Invasive Spartina Project is a coordinated regional effort among local, state and federal organizations dedicated to preserving California's extraordinary coastal biological resources through the elimination of introduced species of Spartina. Cordgrasses are highly aggressive invaders that significantly alter both the physical structure and biological composition of our tidal marshes, mudflats and creeks. The control program is the "action arm" of the San Francisco Estuary Invasive Spartina Project, a project of the conservancy. The program uses an Integrated Vegetation Management (IVM) approach to prioritize and implement control efforts.

Applying this approach, the control program uses all available scientific information regarding the San Francisco Estuary, the invasive cordgrasses, and the likely economic, sociological, and ecological consequences of both the invasion and the treatment program, to develop a management strategy that is effective, economical, and protective of public and environmental health.

To implement the site-specific management strategies, the program relies heavily on partnerships developed with the landowners and managers around the Bay that have non-native Spartina growing on their lands. The conservancy provides treatment and eradication grants to these partners, who subsequently select an appropriate aquatic vegetation control contractor through a competitive bid process, or utilize their own equipment and crews in the case of flood control and mosquito abatement districts. These partners are ultimately responsible for the success of the project through the long-term commitment to monitor and maintain the eradication efforts, and ensure that Spartina is not reintroduced to the system.

=== Explore the Coast program ===
The Conservancy's Explore the Coast Grant program is a small grants program supporting programs that encourage all Californian's to explore and experience the coast, with a focus on under-served communities and young people. Since 2013, the Conservancy has awarded over $4 million in 150 separate grants for programs that bring people to the coast, increase stewardship of coastal resources, and provide educational opportunities. These grants prioritize projects that achieve one or more of these objectives:

- Provide coastal experiences to lower-income or other underserved populations;
- Increase the number of people visiting the coast;
- Improve barrier-free access for persons with disabilities; and/or
- Provide a valuable recreational, environmental, cultural or historic learning experience;
- Increase stewardship of coastal resources; or
- Enhance the public's coastal experience in a way that does not currently exist.

=== Explore the Coast Overnight program ===
In 2019, the Conservancy introduced its Explore the Coast Overnight program to fund projects and programs to increase Californians' opportunities to stay overnight near or on the coast. The program allocates funding from Proposition 68, the Parks and Water Bond Act of 2018, to support the construction of cabins, campsites and other lodging as well as overnight programming at the coast. The Explore the Coast Overnight grant program and the Conservancy's Explore the Coast Overnight Assessment, were developed in response to AB-250 State Coastal Conservancy: Lower Cost Coastal Accommodations Program (Gonzalez Fletcher).

== Leadership ==
The Conservancy's Executive Officer is Amy Hutzel who also serves in the same capacity for the San Francisco Bay Restoration Authority The Deputy Executive Officers are Evyan Sloane and Helen Kang. The Chair of the Conservancy's Board is Douglas Bosco.

== Additional References ==
- Official website
- Hikers Guide, California Coastal Trail info, Coast Walk, 2003
- Los Angeles River Wetlands in the City of Long Beach: A Feasibility Study, City of Long Beach Department of Parks Recreation and Marine May 2002
