= San Clemente Dam =

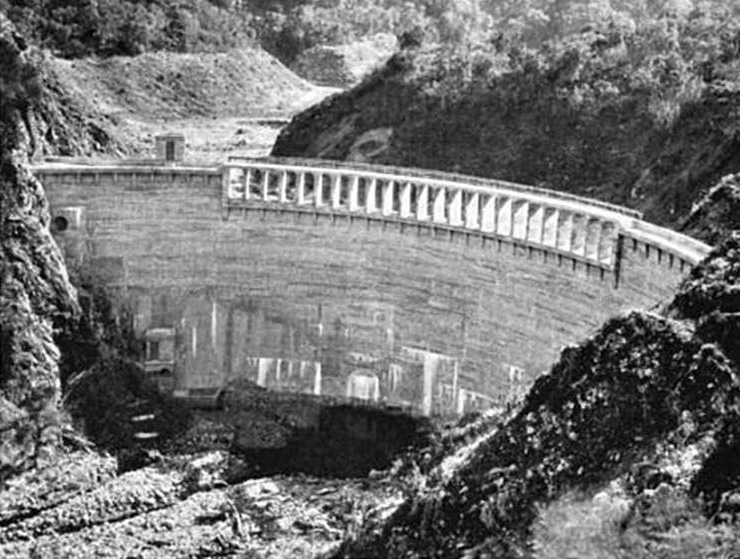
- San Clemente Dam in 1921, shortly before its reservoir was impounded

- Location within California
- Country: United States
- Location: Monterey, California
- Coordinates: 36°26′9.11″N 121°42′31.56″W
- Purpose: Water supply
- Status: Demolished
- Construction began: 1918; 108 years ago
- Opening date: 1921; 105 years ago
- Demolition date: November 2015 (10 years ago)
- Owner: California American Water

Dam and spillways
- Type of dam: Arch
- Impounds: Carmel River
- Height (foundation): 106 ft (32 m)
- Length: 300 ft (91 m)
- Dam volume: 7,070 cu yd (5,410 m^{3})

Reservoir
- Creates: San Clemente Reservoir
- Total capacity: 70 acre⋅ft (86,000 m^{3})

The San Clemente Dam was an arch dam on the Carmel River about 15 mi (24 km) southeast of Monterey in Monterey County, California of the United States. It was located just downstream of the Carmel River and San Clemente Creek confluence. Completed in 1921 to supply water to the Monterey Peninsula, the dam was removed in November 2015 due to safety and environmental concerns.

== Background ==
The San Clemente Dam was implemented by Samuel Morse, owner of the Del Monte Properties Company, in order to supply municipal water to the growing population on the Monterey Peninsula. It would replace the Old Carmel River Dam which was built just downstream in 1883. At a cost of US$300,000, the 106-foot-tall (32 m) arch dam was designed by J.A. Wilcox and constructed by Chadwick & Sykes Inc of San Francisco from 1918 to 1921. About 7,070 cu yd (5,410 m^{3}) of concrete was used in its construction. A fish ladder was constructed on the dam shortly after its completion. In 1930 Morse sold the dam to Chester Loveland, owner of the California Water and Telephone Company (CWTC). In 1966 California American Water (CAW) purchased CWTC and acquired the dam for US$42 million.

=== Removal ===
The dam's reservoir originally had a storage capacity of 1,425 acre⋅ft (1,758,000 m^{3}), but over 2,150,000 cu yd (1,640,000 m^{3}) of sediment built up over the years, leaving the water storage capacity at 70 acre⋅ft (86,000 m^{3}) by 2008. Due to the threat sediment build-up poses to a dam and that the location of the dam is near a fault line, in 1991 the California Department of Water Resources (CDWR) issued a warning of potential dam failure and sought alternatives. In 1992, CAW was required to upgrade the dam for safety which, along with an annual drawdown in reservoir levels, included a US$1 million project which drilled holes in the face of the dam to relieve hydrostatic pressure. In February 2008, the CDWR approved a plan to reroute the Carmel River and demolish the dam. It became known as the Carmel River Reroute & San Clemente Dam plan. An agreement was reached with CAW in 2010 to implement this option.

The project includes rerouting the Carmel River upstream of the dam through a half-mile-long channel into San Clemente Creek, which contains the least amount of sediment. The Carmel River currently contains most of the sediment and the section between the reroute and immediately upstream of the dam will be a permanent holding area since it was determined there is no feasible way to remove all of the sediment. About 380,000 cu yd (290,000 m^{3}) of sediment will also have to be excavated from San Clemente Creek to the permanent holding area on the Carmel River. Once the sediment is secure, the San Clemente Dam and Old Carmel River Dam will be completely removed.

Construction began in 2013 and the Carmel River was diverted by December 2014. By November 2015 the San Clemente Dam was removed. The Carmel River Dam removal and project completion is slated for 2016. The project will cost US$84 million. $49 million is being provided by CAW, US$25 million by the State of California and the remaining by Federal and other funding.

Other benefits from removing the dam include freeing up 7 mi (11 km) of the river for rainbow trout migration and to improve the California red-legged frog habitat.

== See also ==
- Dam removal
