= Carmel River =

Carmel River may refer to:

- Carmel River (California), a river in California, United States
- Carmel River State Beach, state park unit in Carmel, California, United States
- Carmel River (Nicolet Southwest River), a river in Centre-du-Québec, Quebec, Canada
