= Rancho Tularcitos =

Mexican land grant in California

Rancho Tularcitos Los Tularcitos
- Mexican land grant
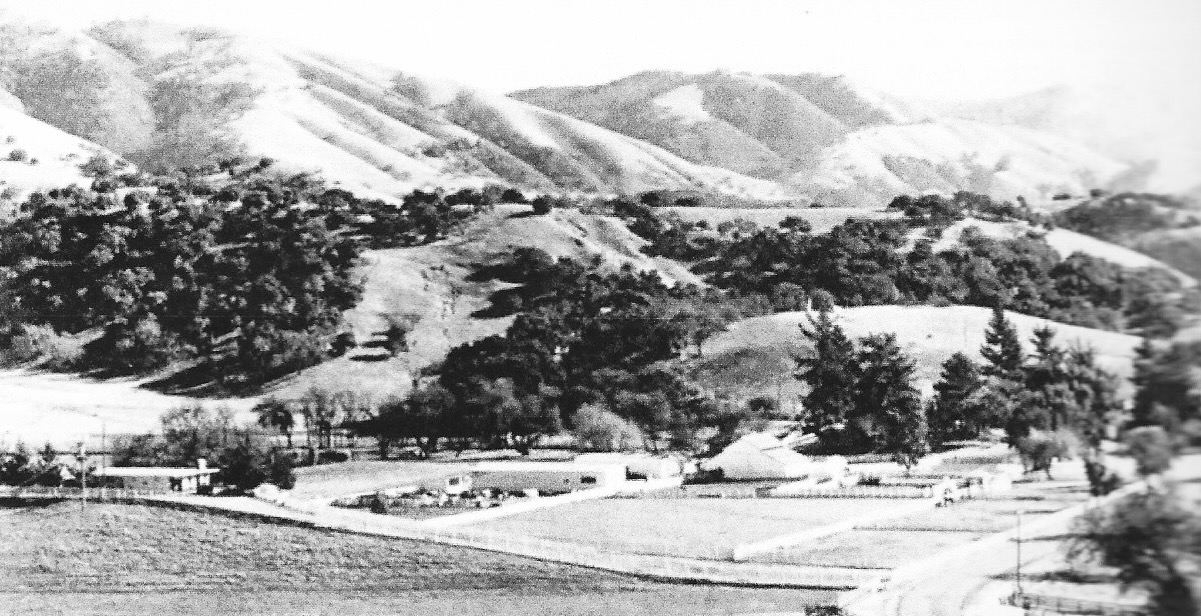
- View of Rancho Tularcitos from west of the ranch, circa 1960s

- Location of Monterey County, California
- Coordinates: 36°28′12″N 121°37′48″W
- Country: United States
- State: California
- County: Monterey County
- Established: 1834

Area
  - Total: 26,581 acres (10,757 ha)

Rancho Tularcitos was a 26,581-acre (107.57 km^{2}) Mexican land grant in present day Monterey County, California, given in 1834 by Governor José Figueroa to Rafael Gómez. Tularcitos means "place of the little Tule thickets". The grant was in the upper Carmel Valley, along Tularcitos Creek, and was bounded on the west by Rancho Los Laureles.

== History ==
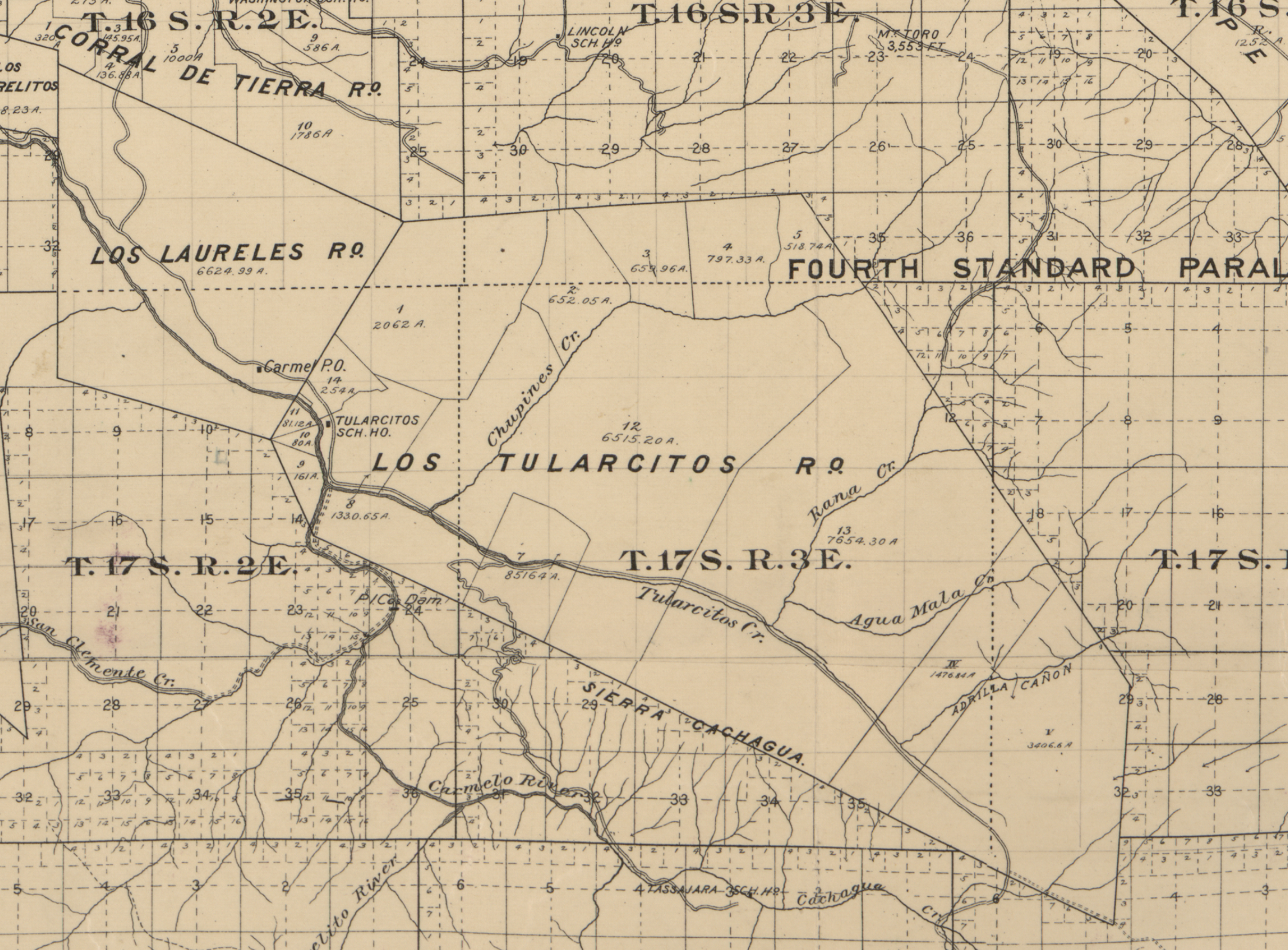
Map indicating Los Tularcitos land grant, 1898

Rafael Gómez (1784-1838), born in Mexico, came to California in 1830 as a legal advisor to Governor Manuel Victoria. In 1831, he married Josefa Antonia Estrada (1813-1890), a daughter of José Mariano Estrada, grantee of Rancho Buena Vista. Gómez was a supporter of Figueroa, but resigned his position, and was granted the six square league Rancho Tularcitos in 1834. He held public offices in Monterey in 1835-36. Rafael Gómez died in an accident on Rancho Tularcitos in 1838.

With the cession of California to the United States following the Mexican-American War, the 1848 Treaty of Guadalupe Hidalgo provided that the land grants would be honored. As required by the Land Act of 1851, a claim for Rancho Tularcitos was filed with the Public Land Commission in 1852, and the grant was patented to Josefa Antonia Estrada de Gómez in 1866.

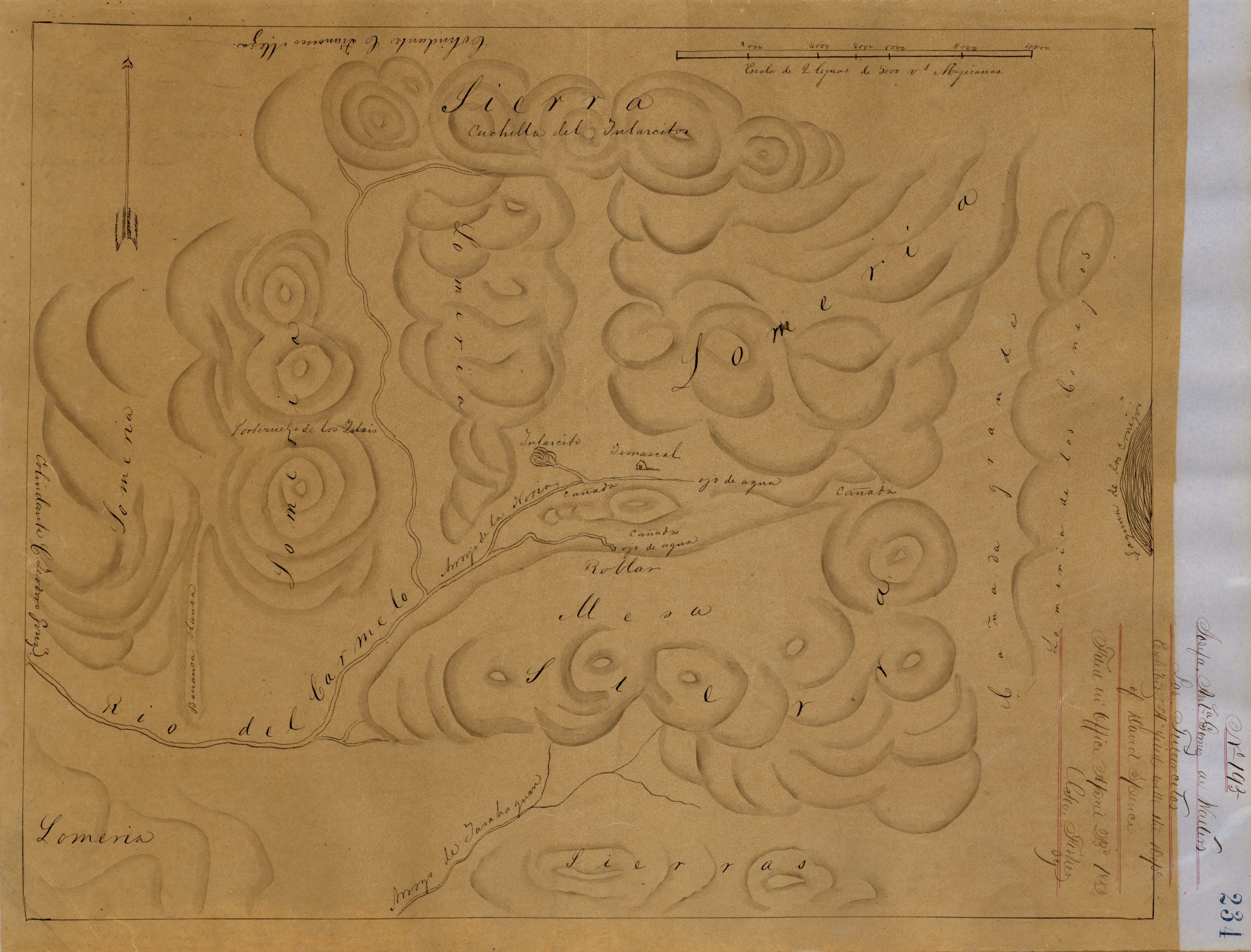
Hand-drawn diseño (map) of Los Tularcitos (Goméz), Diseños, GLO no. 291, Monterey County

After Rafael Gómez died in 1838, Josefa Antonia Gómez married Charles Wolter, a German sea captain of a Mexican ship, who settled in Monterey in 1833. Josefa Antonia Gómez sold Rancho Tularcitos to Andrew J. Ogletree. Ogletree lost the rancho to Alberto Trescony, owner of Rancho San Lucas, in a mortgage foreclosure in 1880. Trescony gradually sold off the land, except for 2,000-acre (8.1 km^{2}). Andrius Blomquist was born in Sweden in 1846 and emigrated to the United States in 1867 to start a new life. He eventually settled in upper Carmel Valley in 1885 and acquired nearly 8,000-acre (32 km^{2}) of Rancho Tularcitos.

In 1924, Rancho Tularcitos came under the ownership of John E. Marble, and the Marble family took on the responsibility of managing the ranching operations for a considerable duration thereafter. The ranch was eventually divided between his sons, John M. and Robert. John M. inherited the ranch headquarters, while Robert received the eastern section of the ranch. By the late 1940s, Bill Dorrance served as the ranch superintendent. Robert Marble decided to rename his portion of the ranch to Rana Creek Ranch.

Mike Markkula bought the 14,000 acres (5,700 ha) Rana Creek Ranch in 1982 from the Marble family. The Wildlands Conservancy acquired Rana Creek Ranch in July 2023 and created Rana Creek Preserve which it plans to open to the public.

== See also ==
- Ranchos of California
- List of Ranchos of California
