= Home Builders Association of Northern California =

Non-profit association

The Home Builders Association of Northern California is a professional, non-profit association which promotes affordable housing and the construction of quality homes in California, USA. HBANC's membership comprises about 1,000 home builders, trade contractors, suppliers and industry professionals in the Bay Area.

HBANC connects individual members to the local construction industry by providing information, education and technical services, as well as networking opportunities through meetings and events. The association also has individual councils and committees that address issues from members’ perspectives.

HBANC had previously come under criticism from environmentalists due to its filing of a lawsuit against the United States Fish and Wildlife Service; claiming that the Endangered Species Act of 1973 was being used to hinder development and economic growth. On October 22, 2007, the Ninth Circuit District Court ruled in favor of the Fish And Wildlife Service.

== See also ==
- California Building Industry Association
