= Carmel River (California) =

River in Monterey County

Carmel River Rio del Carmelo Nuestra Senora del Monte Carmelo
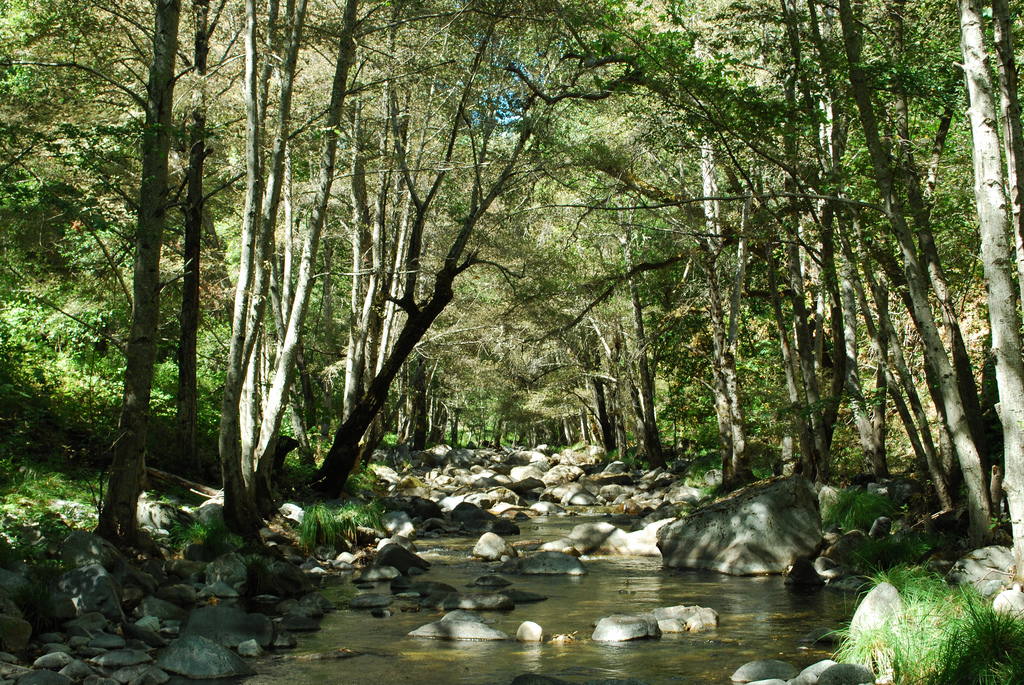
- Carmel River in the Ventana Wilderness

- Location of the mouth of the Carmel River in California
- Native name: tirus ua čorx (Southern Ohlone) (Rumsen language)

Location
- Country: United States

Physical characteristics
- Source
  - location: Santa Lucia Mountains
  - coordinates: 36.318018°N 121.645501°W
  - elevation: 4,120 ft (1,260 m)
- Mouth
  - location: Pacific Ocean
  - coordinates: 36.536072°N 121.928010°W
  - elevation: Sea level
- Length: 36 mi (58 km)
- Basin size: 256 sq mi (660 km^{2})

Basin features
- Tributaries
  - left: Pine Creek, San Clemente Creek, Las Garzas Creek
  - right: Carmel River-Miller Fork, Cachagua Creek, Tularcitos Creek

The Carmel River (Rumsen: tirus ua čorx) is a 41 mi (66 km) river on the Central Coast of California in Monterey County that originates in the Ventana Wilderness of the Santa Lucia Mountains. The river flows northwest through Carmel Valley with its mouth at the Pacific Ocean south of Carmel-by-the-Sea, at Carmel Bay. The Carmel River is considered the northern boundary of Big Sur, the other boundaries being San Carpóforo Creek and the Pacific coastline.

== History ==
Before European first contact, the Indigenous peoples of the Carmel River watershed were the Rumsen Ohlone people in the lower watershed, and the Esselen people of the upper watershed. Both peoples were taken into the Carmel Mission.

The mouth of Carmel Valley where the Carmel River runs into Carmel Bay was first seen by Spanish explorer Sebastián Vizcaíno shortly before he landed in Monterey Bay in December 1602. He wrote about visiting the river on January 3, 1603, but greatly exaggerated its proportions, confusing later explorers. Vizcaino named it El Rio del Carmelo, likely because his voyage was accompanied by three Carmelite friars.

Later that winter the local springs near Monterey froze, and the explorers had to cross the peninsula to find freshwater. Fathers Junípero Serra and Juan Crespí moved Mission San Carlos Borromeo de Carmelo from Monterey to its present site by the Carmel River in 1771, they directed Indian laborers to dig ditches from the Carmel River to water their crops. The river has supplied ranchers and residents ever since.

After railroad baron Charles Crocker built the Hotel Del Monte, he commissioned construction of a Dam in 1883 on the upper river near present-day Cachagua. It supplied 400 acre-feet of water annually to the hotel.

In his 1945 novel Cannery Row John Steinbeck wrote "The Carmel is a lovely little river. It isn't very long but in its course it has everything a river should have."

== Watershed ==
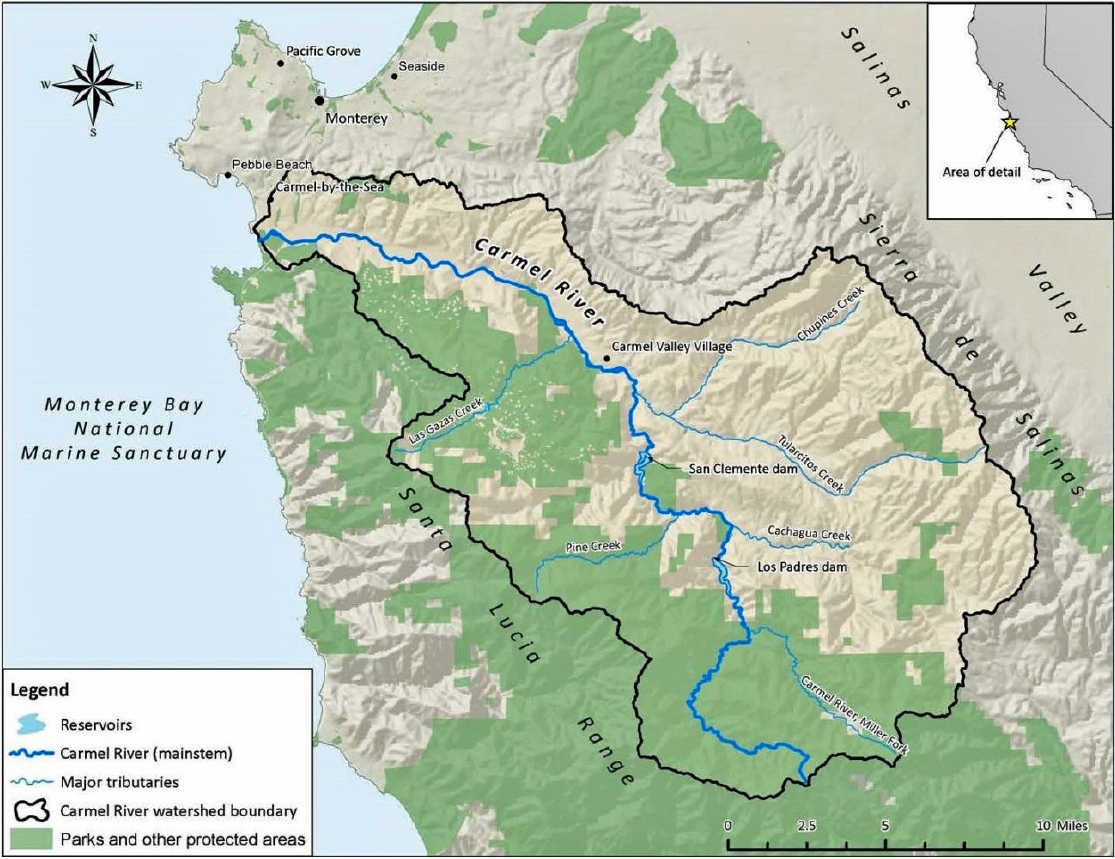
Carmel River Watershed Map with major tributaries, National Marine Fisheries Service 2013

The Carmel River watershed drains 256 square miles (660 km^{2}) and originates at 4,120 ft (1,260 m) on the south side of the peak of Miller Mountain in the Ventana Wilderness of the Los Padres National Forest's Santa Lucia Mountains. The Sierra de Salinas range forms the northeastern divide of the watershed and the northern terminus of the Santa Lucia Mountains forms the southwestern divide. Approximately 96% of the Carmel River flows from the many tributaries in the Santa Lucia Mountains, including San Clemente Creek and Cachagua Creek subwatersheds. In contrast, the combined flow from Tularcitos Creek, and its Rana Creek, and Chupines Creek subwatersheds of the Sierra de Salinas produces only 4% of the annual discharge of the Carmel River, but occupies 23% of the entire watershed. Ventana Double Cone and South Cone are the tallest peaks in the watershed at elevations 4,853 feet (1.479 km) and 4,965 feet (1.513 km), respectively.

Although the length of the river is reported in various publications as 36 mi (58 km), the river length from its origin on the southern side of Mission Mountain peak to its mouth at the Pacific Ocean is 41 miles (66 km) utilizing the United States Geological Survey (USGS) mouth and source coordinates and the USGS National Map. The major tributaries, beginning upstream, are Carmel River-Miller Fork (right), Cachagua Creek (right), Pine Creek (left), Tularcitos Creek (right), and Las Garzas Creek (left). The bee line length of the Carmel River watershed is 26 mi (42 km).

== Ecology ==
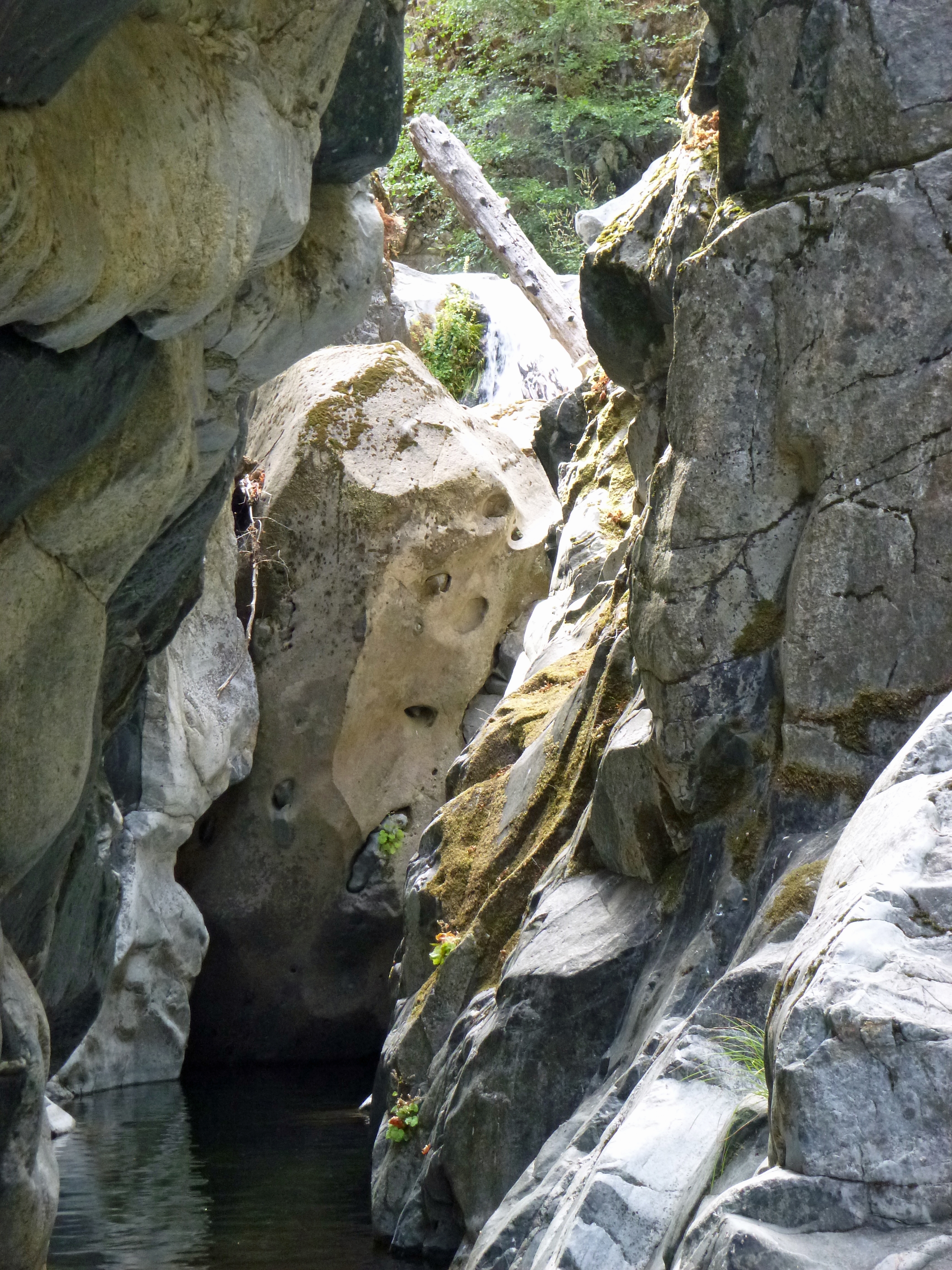
75-foot waterfall on the Carmel River mainstem 6.8 miles above Los Padres Dam - Courtesy Cory Hamilton, Monterey Peninsula Water Management District

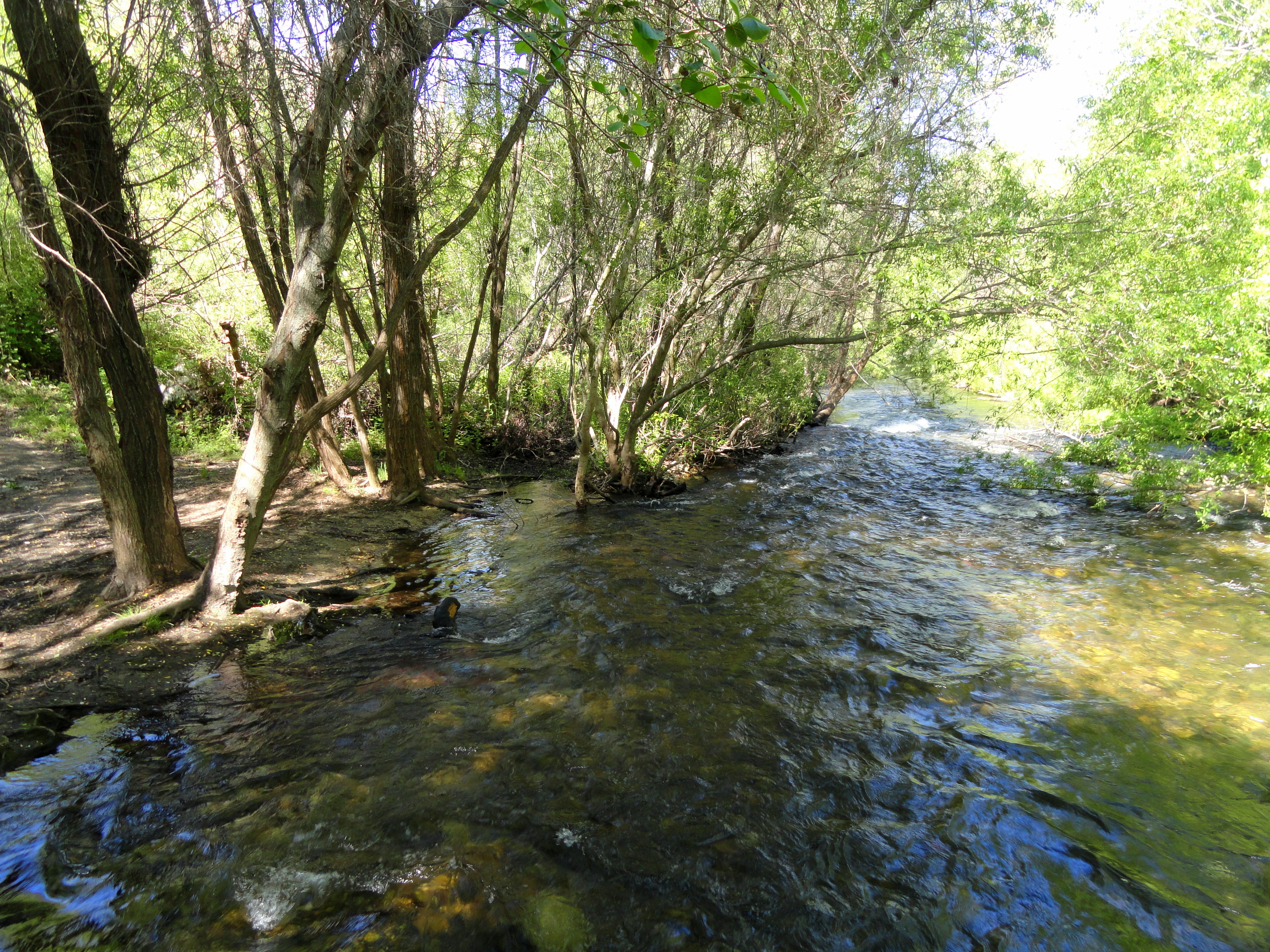
Carmel River - Garland Ranch Regional Park

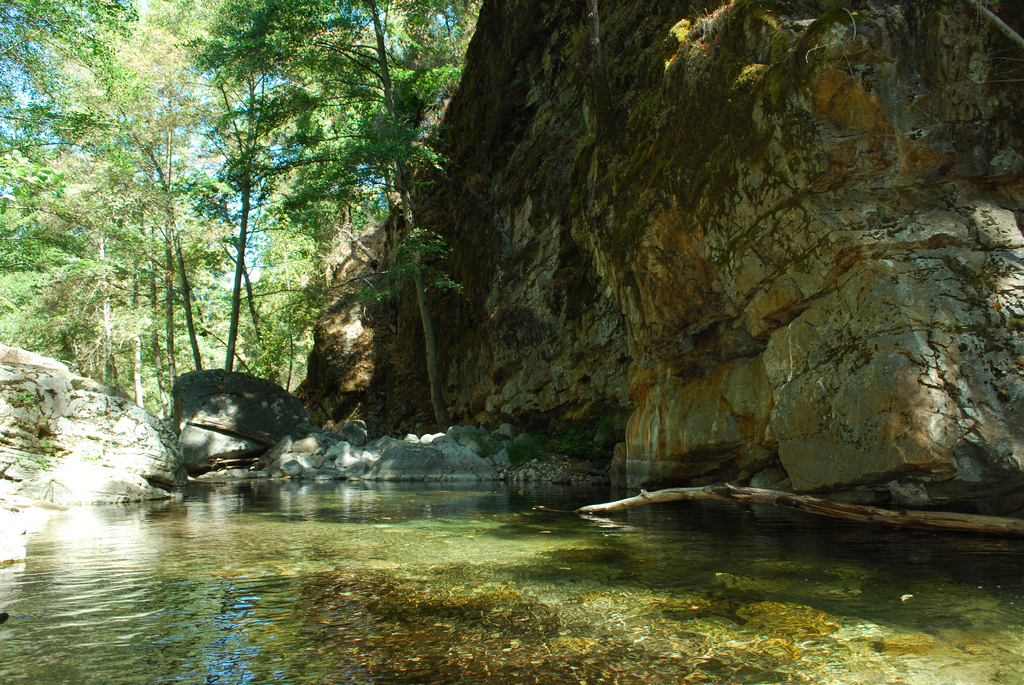
Along the Carmel River Trail upstream of the Los Padres Dam

The river flows through various habitats beyond its bankside riparian zone: starting in mixed evergreen forests at higher elevations, including coast redwoods (Sequoia sempervirens), Coast Douglas fir (Pseudotsuga menziesii var. menziesii) and rare Santa Lucia firs (Abies bracteata) the most endemic fir in North America. At middle elevations the Carmel River flows down through montane chaparral and woodlands, and at lower elevations, to remnant coastal sage and chaparral and coastal prairie, concluding through minor coastal sand dunes at its Pacific mouth.

Stream restoration and conservation projects are proceeding to return/enhance migrating fish in the family Salmonidae, such as the steelhead trout (Oncorhynchus mykiss), and other aquatic and terrestrial flora and fauna to the Carmel River ecosystem. Carmel River steelhead trout are part of the South-Central California Coast Steelhead (SCCCS) distinct population segment (DPS) and listed as threatened under the Endangered Species Act. Removal of the San Clemente Dam via a bypass has removed a partial barrier to steelhead spawning runs and replenished the river below the dam with gravels essential for spawning. The Carmel River supports the largest run of about 27 streams utilized by steelhead trout in the entire South-Central California Coast DPS region. in normal and above water years, adult steelhead can potentially spawn in a total of 73.7 miles of stream, including 28.7 miles of the Carmel River main stem, 34.3 miles of primary tributaries, and 10.8 miles of secondary tributaries. However, Los Padres Dam remains a barrier to steelhead trout in- and out-migration. For passage around Los Padres for adult spawning runs, there is a fish trap at the base of the dam where adults are collected and trucked above the dam and released into the reservoir. For outgoing juveniles/smolts, there is a chute/pipe they are herded into to get them out of the reservoir and into the river downstream of the dam that is operated by NOAA Fisheries. About 6.8 miles (10.9 km) upstream of Los Padres Dam there is a 75-foot waterfall in the river mainstem that is an impassable barrier to anadromous fish. A recent 2022 study has also shown that there is poor downstream passage at the Los Padres Dam which creates an ecological trap for migrating steelhead trout. The steelhead can ascend the fish ladder and spawn above the Los Padres Reservoir but a truncated hydroperiod and low flows limit successfully outmigration back to the ocean.

Another federally threatened species, the California red-legged frog (Rana draytonii) is native to the river.

The Hastings Natural History Reserve lies where Big Creek and Robertson Creek merge to form the Finch Creek tributary to Cachagua Creek, which is, in turn, tributary to the Carmel River mainstem. It is located off Carmel Valley Road just above Jamesburg, California and is a 2,500-acre Biological Field Station of the University of California, Berkeley Museum of Vertebrate Zoology and Natural Reserve System.

== Dams and reservoirs ==
The Carmel River had three dams, with their reservoirs used for drinking water and having severe sediment buildup. The San Clemente Dam, built in 1921, was located 18.5 miles (29.8 km) upstream from the ocean, and once provided drinking water throughout the Monterey Peninsula. It was the second of three dams built on the Carmel River, preceded by the Old Carmel River Dam built in the 1880s and followed by the Los Padres Dam in 1949.

The San Clemente Dam had an original capacity of 1,450 acre⋅ft (1,790,000 m^{3}), but as of 2002, the capacity had fallen to less than 150 acre-feet (190,000 m^{3}) because it was 90 percent silted up. State regulators declared in 1991 that it was in danger of collapsing in an earthquake and spilling the 40 million US gallons (150,000 m^{3}) of water trapped behind its crumbling walls. In January 2010 an agreement was reached with the California American Water Company to dig a new half-mile channel to bypass and strand the sediment behind the dam at a cost of $84 million, beginning in 2013. The Carmel River Reroute and San Clemente Dam Removal Project (CRRDR) was completed at the end of 2015, rerouting the Carmel River channel through a bedrock divide to join San Clemente Creek approximately 2,625 feet (800 m) upstream from the natural San Clemente Creek–Carmel River confluence. The CRRDR opened up 6.5 miles (10.5 km) of historic steelhead rainbow trout habitat on the river mainstem, plus access to three named tributary creeks: San Clemente Creek, Pine Creek and Cachagua Creek. At the time it was the third largest dam removal in North America, and the largest dam removal in a Mediterranean hydroclimate setting.

The Los Padres Dam, built in 1949, is located 26 miles (42 km) upstream from the ocean, and 6.8 miles (10.9 km) above the San Clemente Dam. Its original capacity was 3,030 acre-feet (3,740,000 m^{3}), but as of 2008, its capacity was only 1,775 acre-feet (2,189,000 m^{3}). The most productive habitat for steelhead trout is the 6.2 miles (10.0 km) upstream of Los Padres Dam because of the excellent spawning gravels there. The Los Padres Reservoir is steadily filling with sediment, as the pervasively fractured granitic and metamorphic rock underlying the Carmel River watershed are easily eroded. Sediment loads may greatly increase when fires reduce vegetation cover and are followed by large rainfall events, as in the 1977 Marble Cone Fire that produced catastrophic debris flows. Los Padres dam and reservoir are an impediment to natural flow of woody debris and gravel/sediment downstream, and to steelhead trout migration. However, it also serves an aesthetic function by ensuring summer flow through many miles of river below the dam each summer.

The oldest dam on the river, which was used as a turnout for a water pipeline, was located approximately 2,000 feet (610 m) downstream of San Clemente Dam. It was removed as part of the San Clemente Dam Removal Project. This first dam and associated pipeline was constructed ca. 1880 by Charles Crocker and the Pacific Improvement Company with a labor force that included approximately 700 Chinese workers. This small dam, which has been referred to as the "Chinese Dam" and "Old Carmel River Dam," was built using hewn and mortared granite blocks. A cast-iron pipe 25 miles (40 km) long and 12 inches (30 cm) in diameter was used to deliver water from the dam to the first Del Monte Hotel on the Monterey Peninsula, crossing the Carmel River five times on its way. Remnants of the original iron pipe still exist along Carmel Valley Road, but no records have been found to show where the pipe crossed the river.

== See also ==
- Carmel Bay State Marine Conservation Area
- Hydrological transport model
- List of rivers of California
