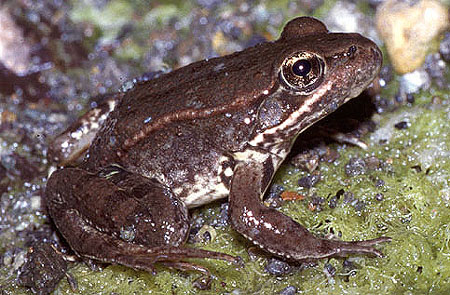

Conservation status
- Near Threatened (IUCN 3.1)

- Imperiled (NatureServe)

Scientific classification
- Kingdom: Animalia
- Phylum: Chordata
- Class: Amphibia
- Order: Anura
- Family: Ranidae
- Genus: Rana
- Species: R. draytonii

Binomial name
- Rana draytonii Baird & Girard, 1852
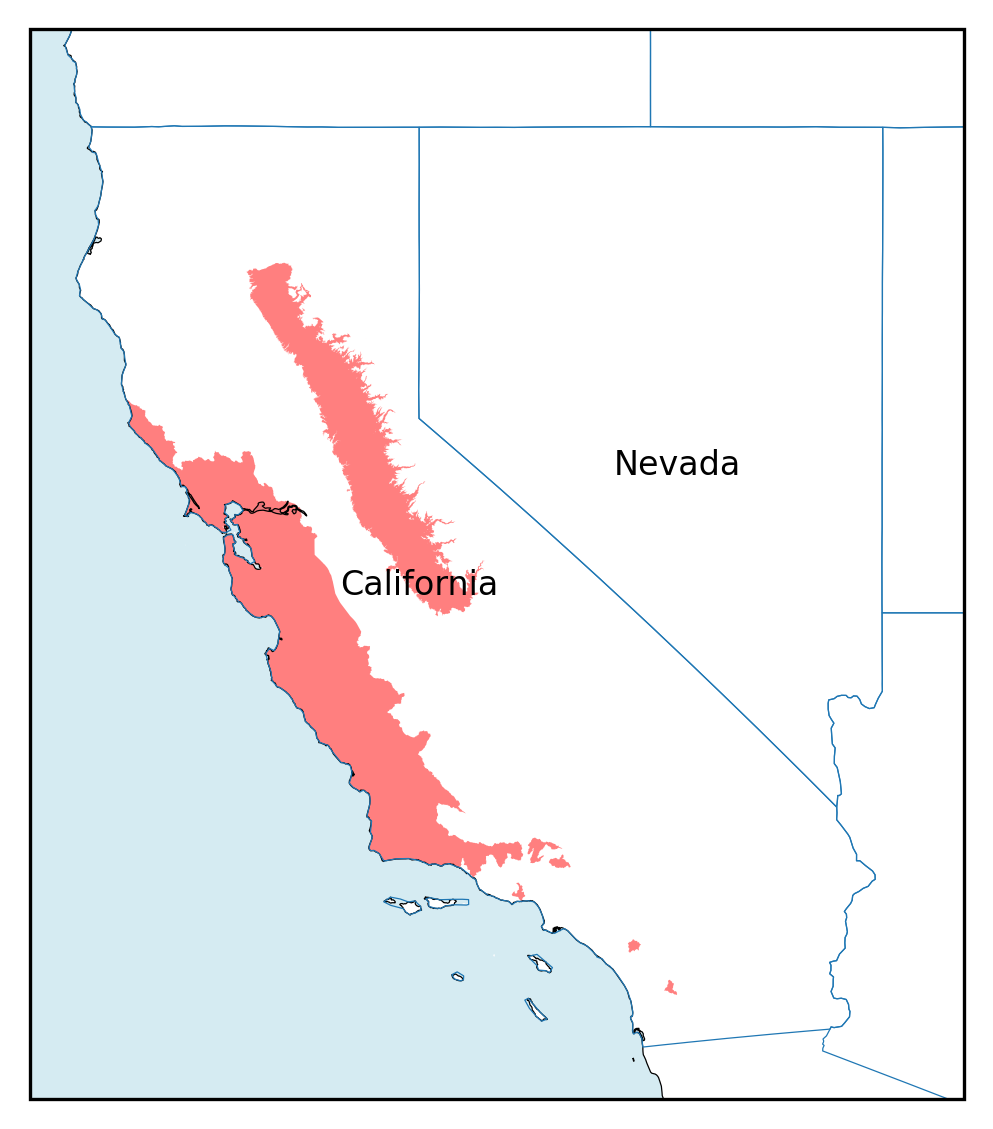

Synonyms
- Rana aurora draytonii Baird & Girard, 1852; Aurorana draytonii (Baird & Girard, 1852); Rana aurora draytoni Baird & Girard, 1852; Rana lecontii Baird & Girard, 1853; Rana longipes Hallowell, 1859; Rana nigricans Hallowell, 1854

= California red-legged frog =

Species of amphibian

The California red-legged frog (Rana draytonii) is a species of frog in the family Ranidae. The species is native to California (USA) and northern Baja California (Mexico). It was formerly considered a subspecies of the northern red-legged frog (Rana aurora). R. draytonii has an IUCN "Near Threatened" conservation status as of 2021, has a NatureServe conservation status of "Imperiled" as of 2015, and is a federally listed threatened species of the United States that is protected by law.

== Distribution ==
The California red-legged frog is found in California and extreme northern Baja California, northwestern Mexico. This species now occurs most commonly along the northern and southern Coast Ranges, and in isolated areas in the foothills of the Sierra Nevada mountains. The current southernmost California populations are on the Santa Rosa Plateau in Riverside County, and within the Upper Las Virgenes Canyon Open Space Preserve in the Simi Hills in eastern Ventura County, near the community of West Hills. In 2015, egg masses from the nearby Simi Hills were introduced to two streams in the Santa Monica Mountains. Juvenile frogs were found living at the locations a year later.

== Description ==
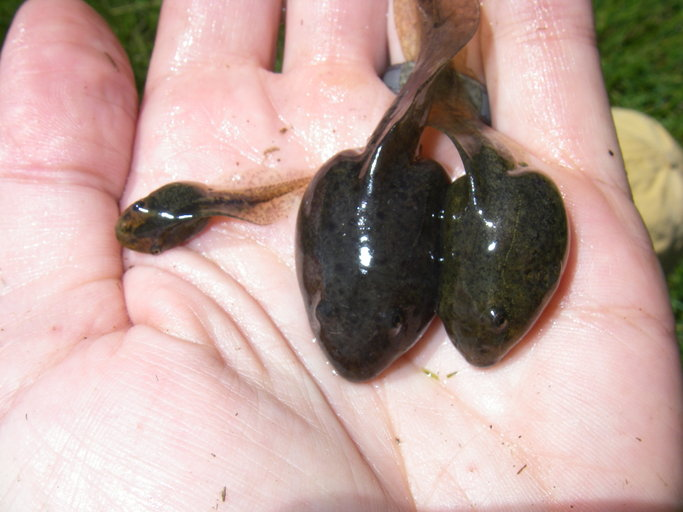
Tadpoles

Rana draytonii is a moderate to large (4.4–14 cm or 1.7–5.5 in) frog. It is the biggest native frog species in the western United States. The back is a brown, grey, olive, or reddish color, with black flecks and dark, irregular, light-centered blotches, and is coarsely granular. A dark mask with a whitish border occurs above the upper jaw, and black and red or yellow mottling is in the groin. The lower abdomen and the undersides of its hind legs are normally red. The male can be recognized by its large forelimbs, thumbs, and webbing. Only a portion of the toes are webbed, and it uses vocal sacs to grunt during the breeding season. The juvenile frog has more pronounced dorsal spotting, and may have yellow, instead of red, markings on the undersides of the hind legs. A characteristic feature of the red-legged frog is its dorsolateral fold, visible on both sides of the frog, extending roughly from the eye to the hip. R. draytonii looks very similar to the northern red-legged frog.

== Ecology and behavior ==
Rana draytonii has disappeared from an estimated 70% of its range, and is now only found in about 256 streams or drainages in 35 counties of California. However, the species is still common along the coast, and most of its population declines are in the Sierra Nevada and Southern California. The California red-legged frog is an important food source for the endangered San Francisco garter snake in San Mateo County. The California newt is often found with this species due to sharing habitat requirements and the newt's eating their eggs. The California red-legged frog primarily eats earthworms, beetles, flies, and other winged insects. There have been instances where the species was viewed as preying on juvenile snakes, small mammals such as mice, and other frogs and tadpoles.

Breeding occurs from late December to early April. The male frog's advertisement call is a series of a few small grunts, usually given while swimming around underwater. Choruses are weak and easily missed. The adult California red-legged frog is nocturnal, while juvenile frogs are both nocturnal and active during the daytime. The species inhabits dense, shrubby, or emergent riparian vegetation and still or slow-moving perennial and ephemeral water bodies that also serve as breeding sites. This species has been noted to utilize upland habitats as adults near aquatic areas (such as creeks). They often use these zones for basking and searching for prey. They prefer tall plants such as cattails for protection and to lay eggs.

The tadpoles (larvae) of this species may metamorphose into frogs within about 7 months of hatching from the egg, or may overwinter, taking up to 13 months. This is a recent discovery, which may have management implications for the species, particularly when aquatic habitat undergoes modification.

The California red-legged frog exhibits several behaviors when approached by predators. They either stay immobile, quickly leap into vegetation in an upland habitat or a water source nearby, or, rarely, give off an alarm call to indicate danger. They have also been seen demonstrating the unken reflex when caught.

== Conservation ==
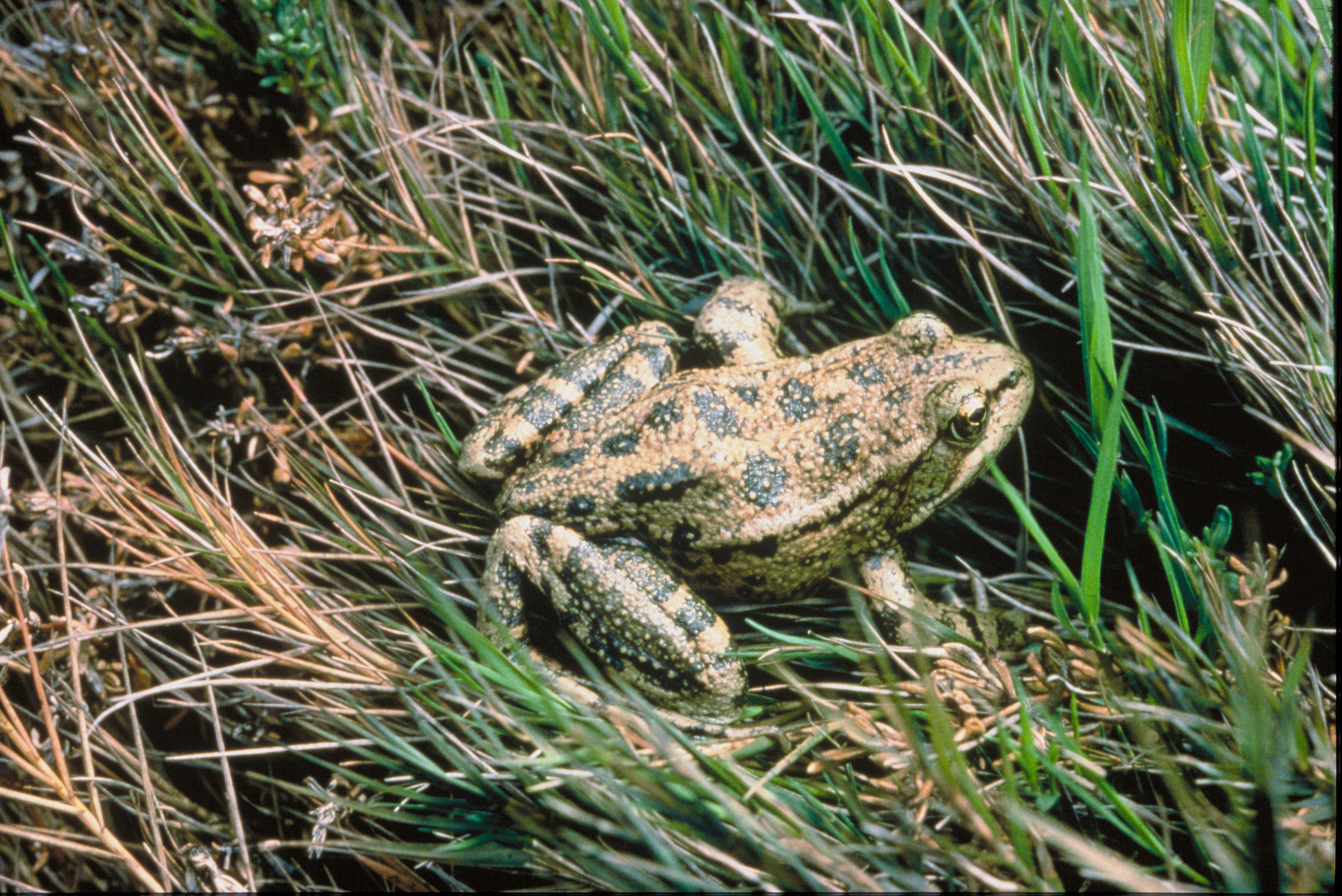
California red-legged frog in habitat

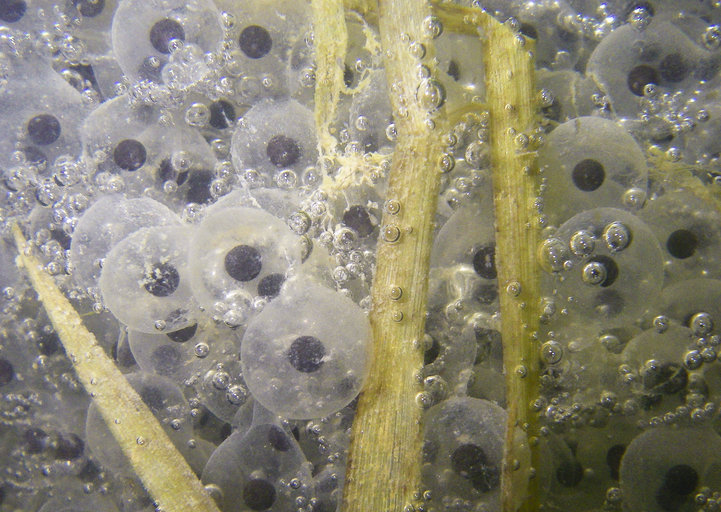
Egg mass

Rana draytonii is listed as threatened and is protected by federal and California law. One cause of the population decline is habitat loss and destruction, but introduced predatory species, such as American bullfrogs, might also be a factor. Their habitats are in close proximity to roads and trails, indicating traffic, runoff, pollution, and other human interference may be a significant threat to the species. The species has also been found thriving in undisturbed and isolated ponds in comparison. Vegetation diversity and surface coverage on smaller ponds indicate a greater likelihood of the species being present.

A 2023 U.S Geological Survey from The United States Geological Survey (USGS) indicates that amphibian populations across regions in the United States are declining at an average rate of 3.79 percent per year, and in some regions, such as the West Coast, declining even further. Amphibians are good indicators of significant environmental changes due to breathing through their skin, which is constantly exposed to environmental factors such as disease, pollution, toxic chemicals, and habitat destruction. The worldwide decline of amphibians, including the California red-legged frog, serves as an early indicator of ecological imbalance, prompting ongoing conservation efforts to address these growing global environmental concerns.

2006

After years of litigation initiated by land developers' organizations, specifically the Home Builders Association of Northern California, and scientific back-and-forth, the US Fish and Wildlife Service announced in April 2006 the designation of about 450,000 acres (1,800 km^{2}) of critical California habitat for the threatened frog. This protected habitat did not include any land in Calaveras County, the setting of Mark Twain's short story, "The Celebrated Jumping Frog of Calaveras County", which features this species.

2008

On September 17, 2008, the US Fish and Wildlife Service proposed to more than triple the habitat of the California red-legged frog, citing political manipulation by former Deputy Assistant Secretary Julie MacDonald at the United States Department of the Interior. According to the Los Angeles Times, "development and destruction of wetlands have eliminated the frogs from more than 70% of their historic range. MacDonald would have reduced what was left of the frog's range by 82%." San Mateo County and Monterey County seem to have some of the largest healthy populations of these frogs, especially in coastal wetlands.

2010

In March 2010, the US Fish and Wildlife Service announced 1,600,000 acres (6,500 km^{2}) of protected land for the species throughout California, which has implications regarding development and use of such land. The largest population of the frog will be given protection on a 48-acre stretch of land (19 ha) in Placer County.

2015

A new law designates the California red-legged frog the "state amphibian." Presently, it is subject to protection under both federal and state laws passed in 1996. Although the designation as official state amphibian does not provide legal protection to the frog as a threatened species, it does highlight the importance that California places on the frog's preservation.

Recent Conservation Efforts (2016-2025)

Since 2015, there have been several high-profile coordination recovery projects that have expanded the range and resilience of the California red-legged frog (Rana draytonii). Primarily, in 2023, the Recovery Champions Program, through the U.S Fish and Wildlife Service, developed a bi-national plan for reintroducing the species through egg transportation from Baja California, Mexico, to sites in Riverside and San Diego counties. Efforts were made to work with landowners and local conservation organizations to identify suitable habitats for releases and to monitor their ongoing development.

The Woolsey Fire in the fall of 2018 in Los Angeles County saw the red-legged frog lose much of its habitat due to forest fires and a heavy season of rainfall that caused debris flows that filled the streams with silt and mud (4). Some adult frogs at every site survived the fire and silt, showing their resistant nature to climate change and natural disasters. Reintroduction sites in the years to follow led to the frogs thriving back to their pre-fire breeding numbers; however, the habitat is still severely damaged, and it's unclear how the frogs will manage to grow their numbers in the long run.

In Napa County, the Land Trust of Napa County began a 2,000-acre wetland restoration initiative in 2022 to rehabilitate pond hydrology and riparian vegetation that supports breeding for the red-legged frog. Funded by an Endangered Species Conservancy and Recovery Program grant from the U.S. Fish and Wildlife Service, the project aims to relocate egg masses into high-quality pond habitats and track individual frogs through tagging.

In the Tahoe National Forest, the U.S Forest Service constructed new wetlands in a 2021 project where representatives from the Forest Service, U.S Fish and Wildlife Service, and the Sheltowee Environmental Educational Coalition arrived in Foresthill, California, to construct 18 new low-maintenance ponds for the red-legged frogs. Joined by over 100 volunteers, the wetlands were modeled after a similar project done on the Eldorado National Forest. After the devastating Mosquito Fire that burned nearly 77,000 acres across El Dorado County, only a small number of frogs survived. In late 2023, volunteers and employees removed the hazard trees and planted native vegetation, which regenerated the wetlands red-legged frog population.
