= Sierra de Salinas =

Mountain range in California, United States

- Location within California

Highest point
- Elevation: 1,354 m (4,442 ft)

Geography
- Country: United States
- State: California
- District: Monterey County
- Range coordinates: 36°24′17.863″N 121°29′31.776″W
- Topo map: USGS Palo Escrito Peak

Sierra de Salinas is a mountain range in the California Coast Ranges, located in central Monterey County, California. The range is a part of the Salinian Block and lies between the Santa Lucia Range to the west and the Salinas Valley, Salinas River, and Gabilan Range to the east.
