= Little Sur River =

River in California, United States

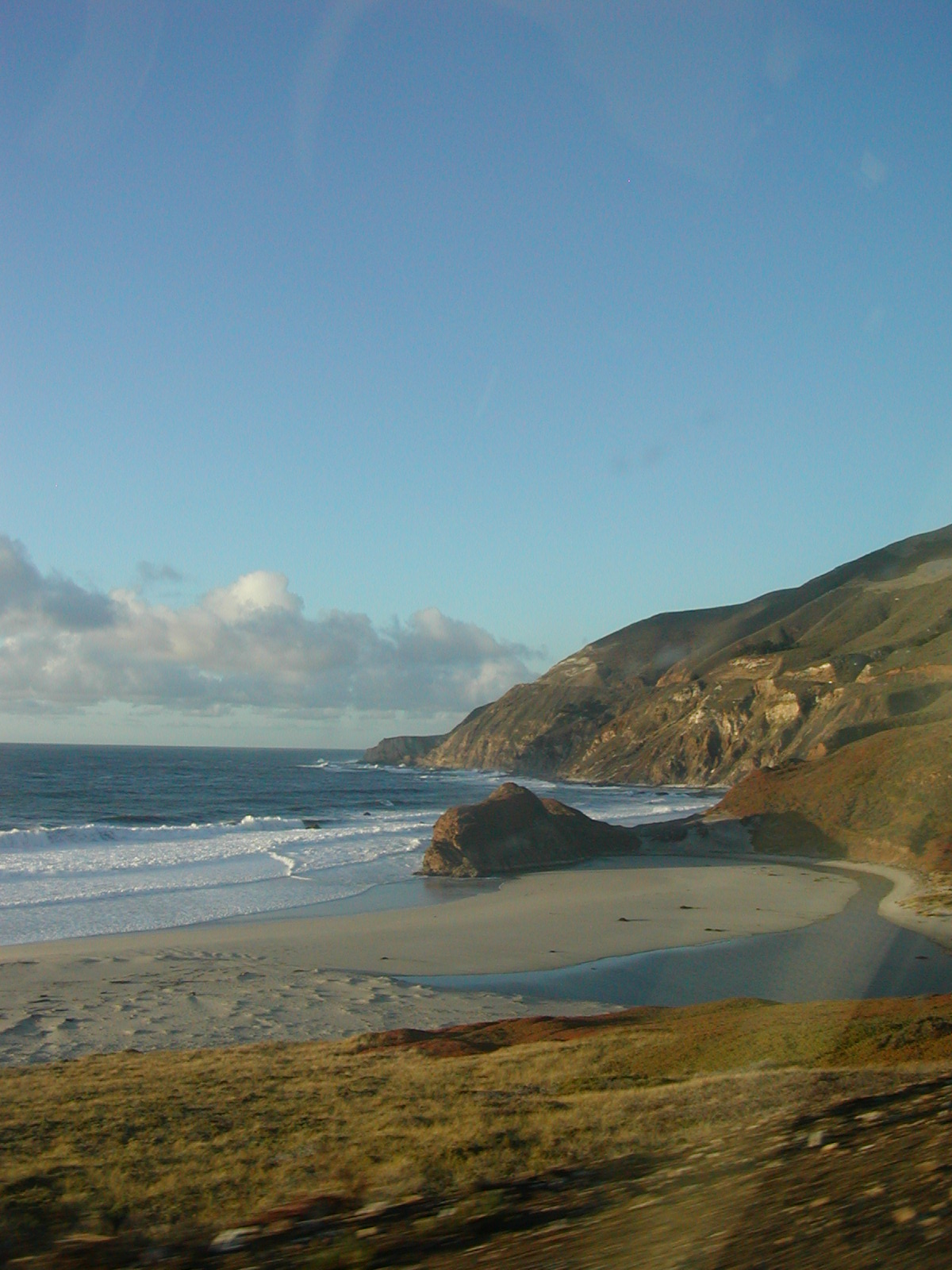
- View of Little Sur River outlet from Highway 1

- Location of the mouth of the Little Sur River in California

Location
- Country: United States
- State: California
- Region: California Central Coast
- County: Monterey County

Physical characteristics
- Source: Ventana Double Cone
  - coordinates: 36°17′49″N 121°42′49″W
  - elevation: 4,853 ft (1,479 m)
- Mouth: Pacific Ocean
  - coordinates: 36°20′05″N 121°53′22″W
  - elevation: 0 ft (0 m)
- Length: 14.3 mi (23.0 km)
- Discharge
  - location: Pacific Ocean

Basin features
- Tributaries
  - left: Skinners Creek (North Fork), Comings Creek (North Fork), Puerto Suelo Creek (North Fork), Launtz Creek (South Fork)
  - right: Ventana Creek (North Fork)

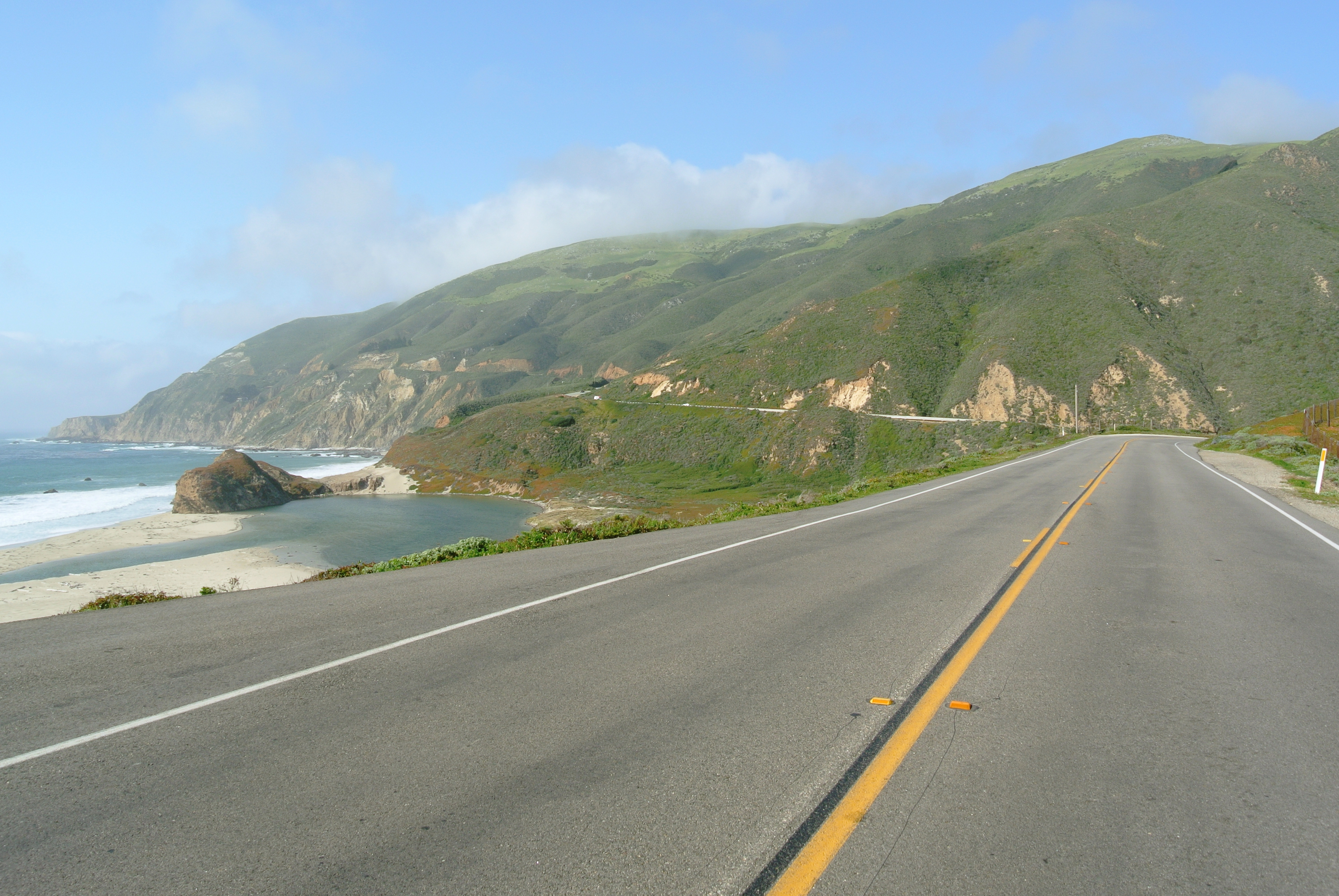
Highway 1 and the mouth of Little Sur River.

The Little Sur River is a 14.3-mile (23.0 km) long river on the Central Coast of California. The river and its main tributary, the a 11.1-mile (17.9 km) long South Fork, drain a watershed of about 40 square miles (100 km^{2}) of the Big Sur area, a thinly settled region of the Central California coast where the Santa Lucia Mountains rise abruptly from the Pacific Ocean. The South Fork and the North Fork both have their headwaters in the Ventana Wilderness, straddling Mount Pico Blanco. Portions west of the national forest and Old Coast Road lie within the El Sur Ranch. Some portions of the North Fork are on land owned by Granite Rock Company of Watsonville, California, which has owned the mineral rights to 2,800 acres (1,100 ha) on Mount Pico Blanco since 1963. The North and South forks converge about 2 miles (3.2 km) from the coast where the river enters the Pacific Ocean.

The river's steep canyons and high chaparral-covered ridges are host to a number of rare species including the Santa Lucia Fir, Dudley's lousewort, and virgin stands of old-growth redwood.

== Watershed ==
=== Protections ===
In 1973 the California State Legislature, recognizing the river's "extraordinary scenic, fishery, wildlife, (and) outdoor recreational values" and to protect its "free-flowing and wild status," added the river to the California Protected Waterways System. Responding to the state's request, in 1981 Monterey County added the river to its Protected Waterways Management Plan and encouraged the state in its Big Sur Coast Land Use Plan to designate the Little Sur area as a "coastal resource of national significance." The mouth of the river is protected because it is surrounded by private land, preventing public access.

=== Wildlife ===
The Little Sur River watershed provides habitat for mountain lion, bear, deer, fox, coyotes and wild boars. The upstream river canyon is characteristic of the Ventana Wilderness region: steep-sided, sharp-crested ridges separating valleys. Because the upper reaches of the Little Sur River watershed is entirely within the Ventana Wilderness, much of the river is in pristine condition. The California Department of Fish and Game says the river is the "most important spawning stream for steelhead" on the Central Coast. and that it "is one of the best steelhead streams in the county." The Little Sur River is a key habitat within the Central California steelhead distinct population segment which is listed as threatened.

A U.S. fisheries service report estimates that the number of trout in the entire south-central coast area—including the Pajaro River, Salinas River, Carmel River, Big Sur River, and Little Sur River—have dwindled from about 4,750 fish in 1965 to about 800 in 2005. The total number of steelhead in the Little Sur River was estimated at less than 100 in 1991.

=== Vegetation ===
The watershed is populated with coastal redwood, Douglas fir, western sycamore, bay laurel, bigleaf maple, and tanbark oak. Mixed in with the redwood and Douglas fir is a riparian habitat containing alder, poison oak, and thimbleberry. The upper slopes are usually a mix of chaparral, covered by coyote bush, ceanothus, chamise, manzanita, sagebrush, and bush lupine. On a few upper slopes may be found patches of open grassland dotted with black oak, canyon live oak, and tanbark oak favored by the early Esselen inhabitants.

The Little Sur River watershed contains stands of some of the most impressive uncut coastal redwood trees in the entire Big Sur area, including specimens over 200 feet (61 m) tall. It also contains the largest and tallest stands of Douglas fir on the Central Coast, up to 150 feet (46 m) in height. A stand of the rare Santa Lucia fir, described as "the rarest and most unusual fir in North America," are found on Skinner's Ridge, east of Pico Blanco Boy Scout camp.

=== Geology ===
The river canyon is deep and narrow, and even in the summer sunshine only reaches the canyon bottom for a few hours. The land is mostly steep, rocky, semi-arid except for the narrow canyons, and inaccessible. The upstream river canyon is characteristic of the Ventana Wilderness region: steep-sided, sharp-crested ridges separating valleys. Upstream from the Boy Scout camp are narrow gorges, waterfalls, and a few large pools.

Several northwest-trending faults cut across the Little Sur River drainage: the Sur, the Palo Colorado, and the Church Creek faults. The river flows mostly west for much of its length, unlike other rivers in the region which tend to flow to the northwest or southeast. Near Camp Pico Blanco, the river meets the Palo Colorado fault and follows it northwesterly for about 1 mile (1.6 km), before turning west towards the Pacific Ocean. The lower length of the South Fork follows the Sur fault zone until it meets the North Fork. West of the Sur fault the earth is composed of Franciscan Assemblage rocks, some exposed serpentine, and overlying sandstone. Most of the Little Sur River geology is to the east of the Sur fault. This area is marked by deep canyons cut through granitic and metamorphic rocks of the Salinian Block. Upstream from the Boy Scout camp the gorges are full of mica schist and gneiss (metamorphosed sedimentary rocks), and granodiorite, quartz monzonite, and quartz diorite (granitic rocks). At the river's mouth are some of the largest sand dunes on the Big Sur coast.

The north and south forks of the Little Sur River straddle either side of Mount Pico Blanco, Spanish for "White Peak." It is topped by a distinctive white limestone cap, visible from California's Highway 1. The native Esselen people revered the peak as a sacred mountain from which all life originated. They believed that three creatures—the eagle, coyote and the hummingbird—rode out the Great Flood atop the mountain and went on to create the world.

=== Weather ===
The Little Sur River basin climate, protected for the most part from coastal fog by Pico Blanco, is characterized by hot, dry summers and rainy, mild winters. Annual temperatures average 50 °F (10 °C) to 65 °F (18 °C). Annual precipitation ranges from 10 to 50 inches (250 to 1,270 mm), with a pronounced summer drought. This interior is hotter than the coastal region and receives less moisture from fog in summer. Severe spring rains have caused mud slides on steep slopes above roads near the hair-pin turns, which briefly closed the road into the Pico Blanco Boy Scout camp during the spring of 1967 and 1969.

== Tributaries ==
The river originates in the area of the Ventana Double Cone and flows to the Pacific Ocean. The upper part of the river's watershed is in the Ventana Wilderness of the Los Padres National Forest. The rest, mostly near the coast, is privately owned. Precipitation increases with altitude at Big Sur. Higher elevations can receive over 50 inches (1,300 mm) per year, about 10 inches (250 mm) higher than lower areas.

The main river, locally known as the North Fork, is in a bowl-shaped watershed, fed by several creeks and surrounded by Launtz Ridge and Pico Blanco (3,709 feet (1,131 m)) to the west, Devil's Peak (4,158 feet (1,267 m)) to the north, Uncle Sam Mountain (4,766 feet (1,453 m)) to the east, and Ventana Double Cone (4,853 feet (1,479 m)) to the southeast. The North Fork flows mostly over granite bedrock. Upstream tributaries include Skinners Creek, Ventana Creek, Comings Creek, and Puerto Suelo Creek. A one-armed man named Vogler built a cabin east of Devil's Peak in the 1880s, later purchased by the Comings family, for whom the location and creek are named today. (They continued to use the cabin until the early 1950s.)

The South Fork of the river flows over granite bedrock, with portions of limestone and marble bedrock. The river has eroded the limestone and marble such that it travels underground in several locations. Tributaries on the South Fork include Rocky Creek, Turner Creek, Bixby Creek, Mill Creek, and Lachance Creek, many of them named for former homesteaders like Antare P. Lachance. Bixby Creek was the site of a landing built to transfer tanbark via cable to ships anchored offshore. The South Fork is unrestricted by any man-made dams, but an impassable waterfall about 12 feet (3.7 m) high 11 miles (18 km) upstream prevents steelhead from migrating further.

== Boy Scout camp ==
Camp Pico Blanco is at 793 feet (242 m) elevation on the North Fork. Upstream tributaries include Jackson Creek, Pine Creek, Puerto Suelo Creek, and Comings Creek. A small creek enters the Little Sur River via a waterfall at the location of the seasonal reservoir in the camp proper. The immediate camp environment consists of seven distinct biotic habitats: coast redwood/mixed evergreen forest, white alder riparian woodland, herbaceous vegetation, aquatic habitat, bare alluvium, bare ground, and Sur Complex bedrock. The camp is accessed via the narrow and winding Palo Colorado Road, 7.6 miles (12.2 km) from the coast, which was closed due to the 2017 Soberanes fire, and as of January 2021 remains closed. Some of the redwoods in the vicinity of the camp were planted between 1910 and 1921.

=== Dam ===
There is a seasonal 11 feet (3.4 m) high concrete flash board dam on the North Fork of the river in the Camp Pico Blanco. Built in 1953, it creates a small recreational reservoir about 2 acres (0.81 ha) in size. In 2002, the California Department of Fish & Game attempted to stop the Monterey Bay Area Council from using the dam. After intervention by Rep. Sam Farr and Senator Bruce McPherson, the Fish and Game retreated from preventing the council from filling the dam, but stipulated that certain regulations must be adhered to.

The National Marine Fisheries Service discovered shortly afterward that the Council appeared to have filled the dam in violation of these regulations, "dewatering" the river below the dam and killing at least 30 threatened steelhead trout. The council could have been subject to fines of up to $360,000. The council avoided paying a fine by building a $1 million custom fish ladder.

== Habitat for endangered species ==
=== Steelhead trout ===
In 1895, a fishing journal reported that "there are plenty of large fish in the stream, and there are several fine streams running into the North Fork, all full of California trout." A 1903 state report similarly reported that "The Big and Little Sur Rivers... are noted for trout-fishing."

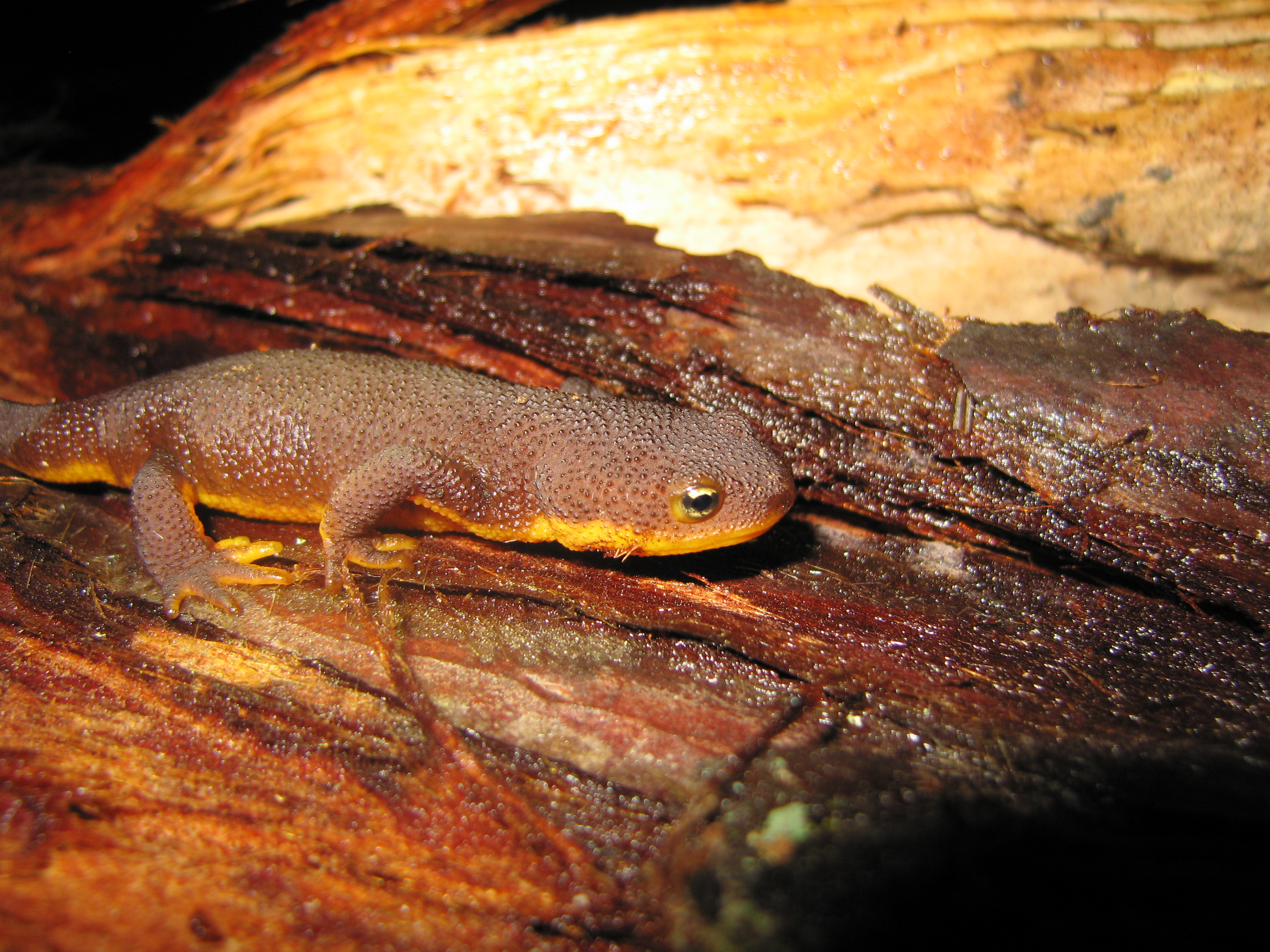
Coastal Range newt

A 1965 report said the stream contained about 30 miles (48 km) of prime habitat for the threatened steelhead.

An advertisement from 1910 for the Idlewild Resort at the junction of the North and South forks of the river described the pool at the mouth of the river as "the famous '1000 Salmon trout pool.'"

In 2002, Fish and Game staff surveyed the Little Sur River in the vicinity of the Camp Pico Blanco and found "numerous" steelhead fry and fingerlings. They described the river as "probably the most productive steelhead river south of the San Francisco Bay at this time." The Little Sur River is considered by the California Department of Fish and Game to be the "most important spawning stream for steelhead" on the Central Coast and "one of the best steelhead streams in the county."

As of 2011, fishing is limited to the fourth Saturday each month from May through October 31 each year. Only artificial lures with barbless hooks may be used.

=== Amphibians ===
Other at risk species found in the river's riparian corridor include the California red-legged frog (Federally threatened, California Species of Concern), western pond turtle(California Species of Concern), foothill yellow-legged frog (California Species of Concern), and the Coastal Range newt (California Species of Concern).

=== Rare vegetation and wildlife ===
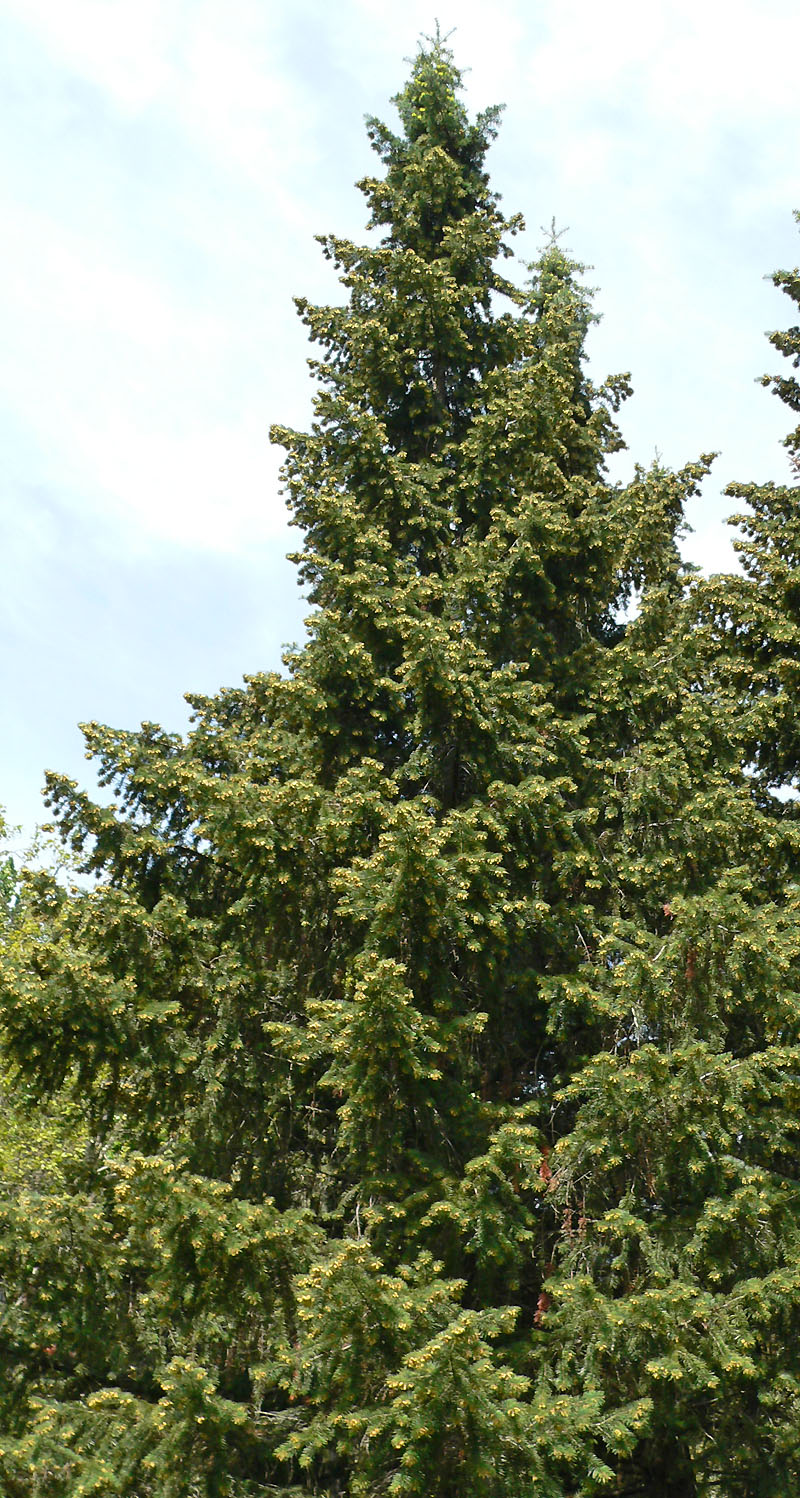
A specimen of Santa Lucia Fir in the Regional Parks Botanic Garden, Berkeley, California

The area was first surveyed in 1905 when the region was set aside as part of the Monterey Forest Preserve. That survey noted that the redwoods achieved their maximum development along the Little Sur River. The Little Sur River watershed contains stands of some of the most impressive uncut coastal redwood trees in the entire Big Sur area, including specimens over 200 feet (61 m) tall. It also contains the largest and tallest stands of Douglas fir on the Central Coast, up to 150 feet (46 m) in height. A stand of the rare Santa Lucia fir, described as "the rarest and most unusual fir in North America," are found on Skinner's Ridge, east of the Camp Pico Blanco. There are also a few ponderosa pine in the lower canyon.

The North Fork of the Little Sur River supports the largest known population found on public lands of the rare Dudley's lousewort. Endemic to redwood forests, fewer than 10 known locations are known to support the plant.

== Fire impact ==
Fire is an integral part of the Little Sur River landscape. Upper elevations are typically covered by chaparral. In one of the first recorded fires in 1894, most of what is now the Monterey Ranger District, including the Little Sur River watershed, was burned by a fire that was unchecked for weeks. In October, 1905 another fire raged for more than a month, consuming all of the Palo Colorado and Pico Blanco area. The Molera Fire in 1972 burned a considerable portion of the watershed, and in August, 1977, the Marble-Cone Fire burned the entire area. This was repeated in 2008 when the Basin Complex fire involved the entire watershed. In 2016, the Soberanes Fire once again burned through almost the entire Little Sur River watershed with the exception of areas west of the Old Coast Road.

== History ==
The Little Sur River area has always been sparsely occupied. The land is mostly steep, rocky, semi-arid except for the narrow canyons, and inaccessible, making long-term habitation a challenge.

=== Esselen tribe ===
The area was first occupied by the Esselen American Indians who followed local food sources seasonally, living near the coast in winter, where they harvested rich stocks of mussels, abalone and other sea life. In the summer and fall they move inland to harvest acorns gathered from the black oak, canyon live oak and tanbark oak, primarily on upper slopes in areas outside the current camp's location. A large boulder with a dozen or more deep mortar bowls worn into it, known as a bedrock mortar, is located in Apple Tree Camp on the southwest slope of Devil's Peak, north of Camp Pico Blanco. The holes were hollowed out by Indians who used it to grind the acorns into flour. Other mortar rocks have also been found within the Boy Scout camp at campsites 3 and 7, and slightly upstream from campsite 12, while a fourth is found on a large rock in the river, originally above the river, between campsites 3 and 4.

Pico Blanco, which splits the north and south forks of the river, was sacred in the native traditions of the Rumsien and the Esselen, who revered the mountain as a sacred place from which all life originated. The Spanish mission system led to the virtual destruction of the Indian population. Estimates for the pre-contact populations of most native groups in California have varied substantially. Alfred L. Kroeber suggests a 1770 population for the Esselen of 500. Sherburne F. Cook raises this estimate to 750. A more recent calculation based on mission baptism records and population density is that they numbered 1,185–1,285.

=== European contact ===
On June 14, 1771, Father Junípero Serra founded Mission San Antonio de Padua near the current town of Jolon. By about 1822, much of the native Indian population had been forced into the Spanish mission system, and most of the interior villages within the current Los Padres National Forest were uninhabited. Virtually all of the Esselen were baptized and relocated to Mission San Carlos Borromeo de Carmelo in present-day Carmel, California, where many died from disease, demoralization, poor food, and overwork. The last baptism of an Esselen native was recorded in 1808, and there is evidence that some members may have avoided control of the Spanish mission by escaping into the relatively inaccessible upper reaches of the Carmel and Arroyo Seco Rivers' watershed.

=== European settlement ===
Along with the rest of California, Big Sur became part of Mexico when it gained independence from Spain in 1821. On July 30, 1834, Mexican governor José Figueroa conveyed the 8,949-acre (36 km^{2}) Rancho El Sur land grant to Juan Bautista Alvarado. Alvarado later traded his Rancho El Sur to his uncle by marriage, Captain John B.R. Cooper, in exchange for Rancho Bolsa del Potrero y Moro Cojo.

Bixby Landing in 1911. Similar landings were constructed in a number of locations, including Notley's Landing at the mouth of Palo Colorado Canyon.

After California revolted against Mexican rule and became a U.S. state, a few hardy pioneer homesteaders settled in the Big Sur region, drawn by the promise of free 160 acre (0.6 km^{2}) parcels. They filed United States government patents as early as 1891. These settlers included William F. Notley, who homesteaded at the mouth of Palo Colorado Canyon in 1891.

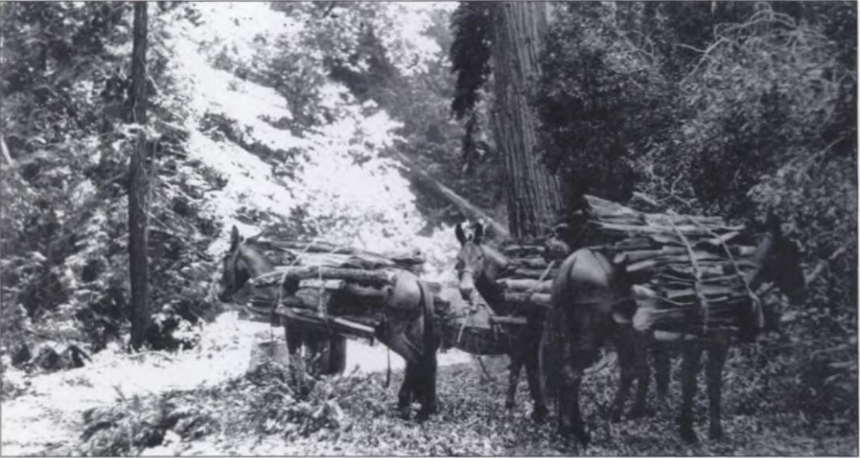
A major forest product of Big Sur coast was the bark of Tanbark Oak trees. The bark, high in tannic acid, was used to cure leather. After the trees were felled, the bark was stripped from the trunks, dried, and then packed out via mule or sleds, called "go-devils", or on wagons.

He began harvesting tanoak bark from the canyon, a lucrative source of income at the time. The bark was used to manufacture tannic acid, necessary to the growing leather tanning industry located in Santa Cruz, about 80 miles (130 km) to the north. Notley constructed a landing at the mouth of the Palo Colorado River like that at Bixby Landing to the south. The tanbark was harvested from the isolated trees inland, corded, and brought out by mules or on wooden sleds nicknamed "go-devils". A point on the Palo Colorado Road is still nicknamed "The Hoist" because of the very steep road which required wagon-loads of tanbark and lumber to be hoisted by block and tackle hitched to oxen. One of the original pulleys is mounted under a long plank supporting mailboxes along the road.

=== Notleys Landing ===
At the coast, the tanbark was loaded by cable onto waiting vessels anchored offshore at a dog-hole port named Notley's Landing. Notley's Landing was used to ship the tan bark north, and a small hamlet existed at that spot from 1898 to 1907. In 1889, as much as 50,000 cords of tanbark were hauled out from the Little Sur River and Big Sur River watersheds. Redwood harvesting was limited by the rugged terrain and difficulty in transporting the lumber to market. Near the start of the 20th century, the tan oak trees were becoming seriously depleted, which slowly led to the demise of the industries they had created.

A one-armed man named Vogler built a cabin east of Devil's Peak in the 1880s, later purchased by the Comings family, for whom the location and creek are named today. (They continued to use the cabin until the early 1950s.) Other early homesteaders in the Palo Colorado Canyon region included Thomas W. Allen, 1891, Isaac N. Swetnam, 1894, Harry E. Morton, 1896, Samuel L. Trotter, 1901, Abijah C. Robbins, 1901, and Antare P. Lachance, 1904. Swetnam bought the Notley home at the mouth of Palo Colorado Canyon and also constructed a small cabin on the Little Sur River at the site of the future Pico Blanco camp.

Alfred K. Clark built a home on the south fork of the Little Sur River around the turn of the century. He filed a land patent for 158.06 acres (63.96 ha) on June 30, 1906. Clark searched for silver unsuccessfully on his property for many years. Before he died, he told his neighbor and friend Al Geer that he had found a cavern decorated with "elephants with long shaggy hair and curly teeth" and "cats with long sharp teeth."

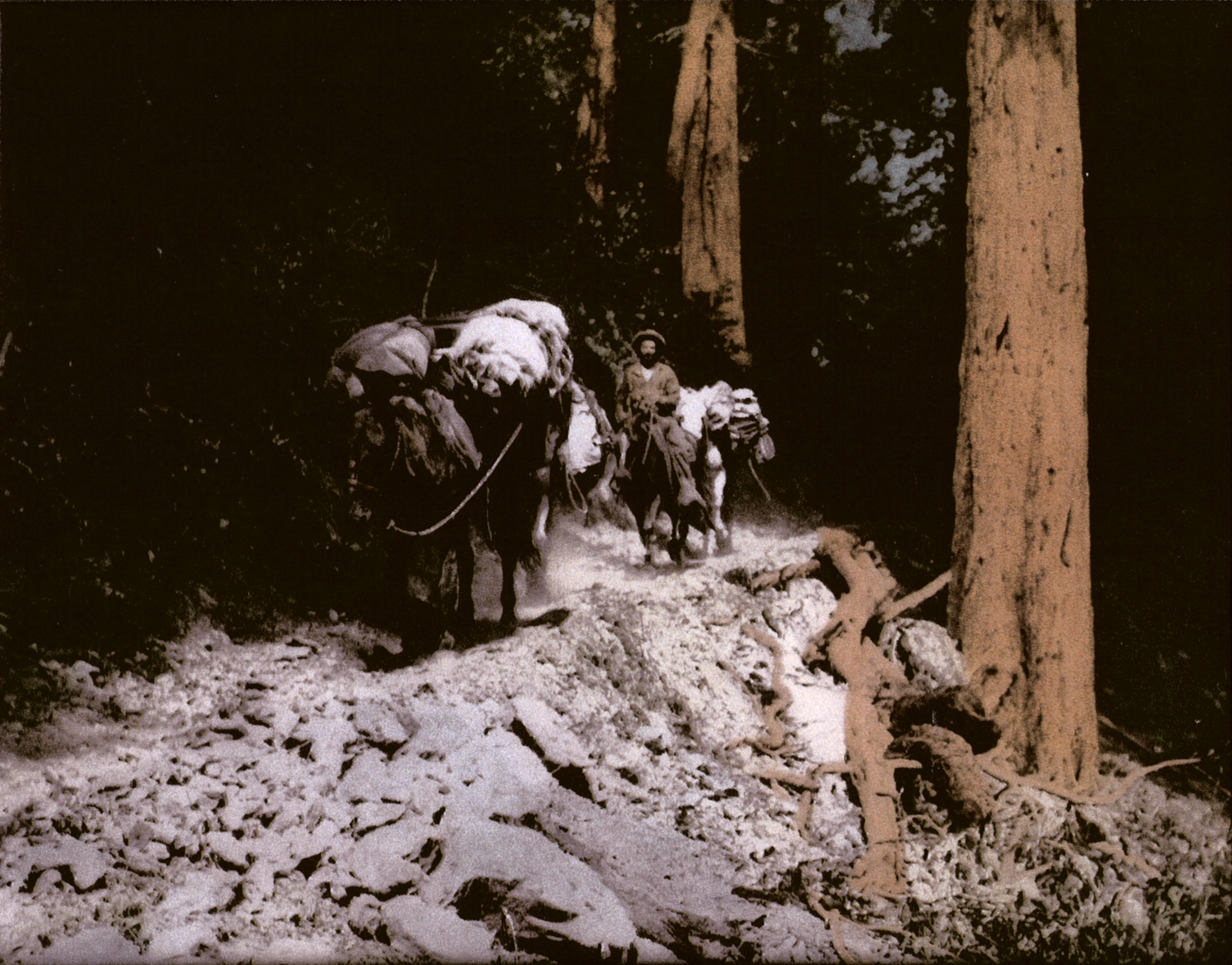
Hand-tinted photograph of local Cowboy Roy Bixby leading pack mules through the redwoods in Palo Colorado Canyon on 1932.

=== Idlewild Resort ===
A travel brochure published in 1890 describes the "embryo Saratoga Springs ... owned by Mr. Keleher, who discovered them, and Dr. S. M. Archer" of Monterey County Hospital. It states that the springs "are situated nearly fifty feet above the river channel" and reported that, "The ocean, with a beautiful sandy beach, is but two miles distant." In 1893, the Monterey Cypress reported on a visitor who caught a 3.5 pounds (1.6 kg) trout in front of Keleher's home on the river.

Charles Howland drove the mail stage between Monterey and Big Sur in about 1900. He built the Idlewild Hotel about .25 miles (0.40 km) east of the Old Coast Road where it crosses the Little Sur River. He and his wife offered large tents furnished with stove, cooking utensils, dishes, cots, and mattresses for $3.00 per week. A stage ran from the Everett House and later the Pacific Ocean House in Monterey to the hotel on Mondays, Wednesdays, and Fridays every morning beginning on August 3, 1901. Hotel rooms were $1.50 per day. The Idlewild and the Pfeiffer Ranch Resort were only two hotels in the Big Sur region hosting guests in 1905.

William T. Mitchell bought the resort in about 1909. He guaranteed guests their full limit of trout from the Little Sur River, bragging that children could catch fish with bent pin hooks. Reports included mention of guests taking advantage of a hot springs upstream from the hotel. W. T. Mitchell sold the hotel back to its original owners, Charles Howland and his wife, in June 1911.

The hotel was near John Bautista Henry Cooper's 10,000 acres (4,000 ha) Rancho El Sur. When he died in 1899, his wife Martha Brawley Cooper received 2,591 acres (1,049 ha) of his estate. Their children John B.R. Cooper, Alfred, Alice, and Abelardo each inherited a share of the land. On April 9, 1913, she acquired the land formerly owned by Charles and Hattie Howland along the Little Sur River in a Sheriff's sale for $6,590.60 (or about $215,000 today). When Alfred died in an auto accident on September 2, 1913, his two siblings Abelardo and Alice assigned their interest in his estate including the Rancho to their mother, Martha. The additional land apparently included the location of the Idlewild Hotel on the south bank of the north fork.

During the next season, the Howlands moved the Idlewild Hotel to the north side of the North fork of the Little Sur River. In a series of competing ads beginning on May 2, 1914, Martha Cooper placed a notice in the Monterey Daily Express that the "summer resort on the Little Sur River known as 'Idlewild' is permanently closed to the public." Immediately below that notice, Charles Howland "former owner of Idlewild", ran a larger ad for Idlewild's "new camp... Same county, same streams, near same old spot."

Cooper continued to run an ad notifying the public that the Idlewild resort was closed through the end of 1918. Howland similarly ran his ad alongside hers for much of the same period of time. Cooper offered a reward for information leading to the arrest and conviction of anyone trespassing on the Cooper land. In a report in The Californian on July 1, 1919, Charles Howland is once again named as the owner of the Idlewild. On July 25, 1919, Mignnnette Myers Gruit described the "Hitchcock camp" at Camp Idlewild, entertainment, and a large number of visitors. The 300 acres (120 ha) of land became the subject of a legal dispute between the Howlands and their partners, John and Anna Brown. A judge finally ruled that they should split the land.

=== Early trails and roads ===
José Castro documented the first trail from Monterey to Palo Colorado Canyon in 1853, when he filed a map of the rancho. A trail was in use from Palo Colorado Canyon to Mill Creek (present-day Bixby Canyon) by about 1855. The area was very isolated and only the sturdiest and most self-sufficient settlers stayed. In 1870, Charles Henry Bixby and his father hired men to improve the track and constructed the first wagon road including 23 bridges from the Carmel Mission to Bixby Creek.

Bixby later partnered with William B. Post to extend the road 11 miles (18 km) inland, around Bixby Canyon and up Cerro Hill to the junction of the north and south forks of the Little Sur River, and thence south to the Post Ranch. The 30 miles (48 km) trip was over a rough and dangerous track. The single-lane road was closed in winter when it became impassable. Coast residents could receive supplies via a hazardous landing by boat from Monterey or San Francisco. The road was gradually improved, including grading of the road up Cerro Hill from the coast to the Little Sur River. By 1920, the 26 mi (42 km) trip from Carmel in a light spring wagon pulled by two horses could be completed in about 11 hours. A lumber wagon pulled by four horses could make the trip in 13 hours. A side road into Palo Colorado Canyon was in place by 1900.

Prior to the completion of the two-lane Carmel-San Simeon Highway in 1937, the California coast south of Carmel and north of San Simeon was one of the most remote regions in the state, rivaling nearly any other region in the United States for its difficult access.

The United States Army Corps of Engineers began building a road from the end of Palo Colorado Road in 1950 from a location known as "The Hoist" to Bottcher's Gap (2,050 feet (620 m)), the site of former homesteader John Bottcher's cabin in 1885–86. The road leaving Bottcher's Gap traverses extremely steep terrain, necessitating four narrow switchbacks. The road reached the Little Sur River in the vicinity of the camp in the summer of 1951. The council turned over the road from The Hoist to Bottcher's Gap to Monterey County in 1958. In 1963, the Council Executive estimated that buying the land at that time would cost the council over $1 million, or nearly $72,562,500 in today's dollars.

=== National forest creation ===
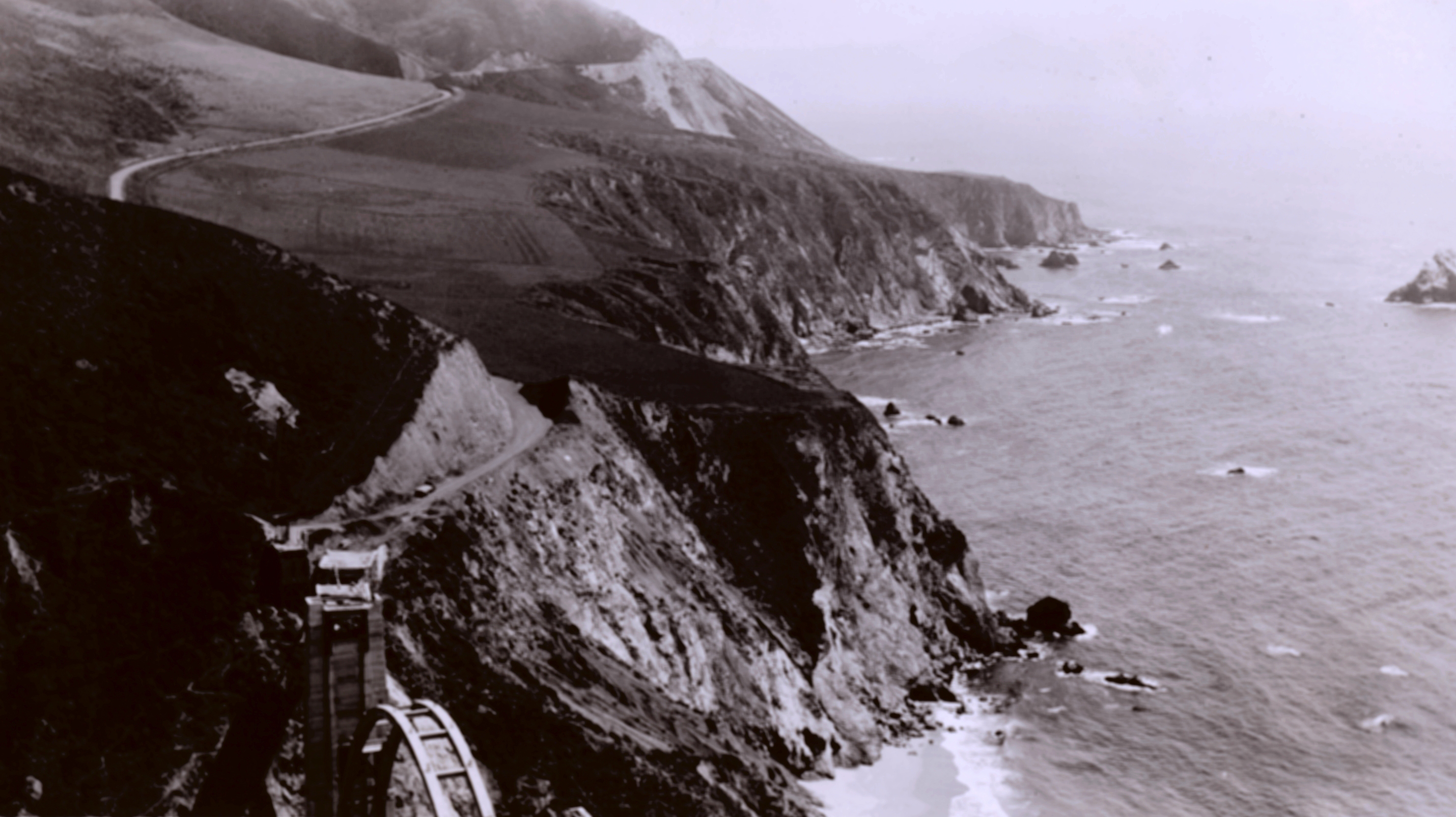
Bixby Canyon Bridge under construction in 1932

In October, 1905 the land that now makes up the Los Padres National Forest, including the South Fork and portions of the upper reaches of the North Fork of the Little Sur River watershed, were withdrawn from public settlement by the United States Land Office, although current landholders were allowed to retain their property. In January 1908, 39 sections of land, totaling 25,000 acres (10,000 ha), were added to the Monterey National Forest by President Theodore Roosevelt in a presidential proclamation. Several tanning companies and some homesteaders retained ownership of land within the area which were not purchased by the government.

By 1916 the Kron Tanning Company of Santa Cruz and the Eberhard Tanning Company of Santa Clara had acquired most of the acreage along the Little Sur River from the original owners. Interest in preserving the abundant growth of redwoods in the area prompted newspaper publisher William Randolph Hearst to purchase the entire acreage. On November 18, 1921, the Hearst Sunical Land and Packing Company paid approximately $50,000 to buy the land from the tanning companies.
