= Soccorondo, California =

Former settlement in Monterey County, California, U.S.

Soccorondo is a former Esselenian settlement in Monterey County, California, United States. Its precise location is unknown.
