= Rancho El Sur =

Mexican land grant in California

Coordinates: 36.300°N 121.840°W

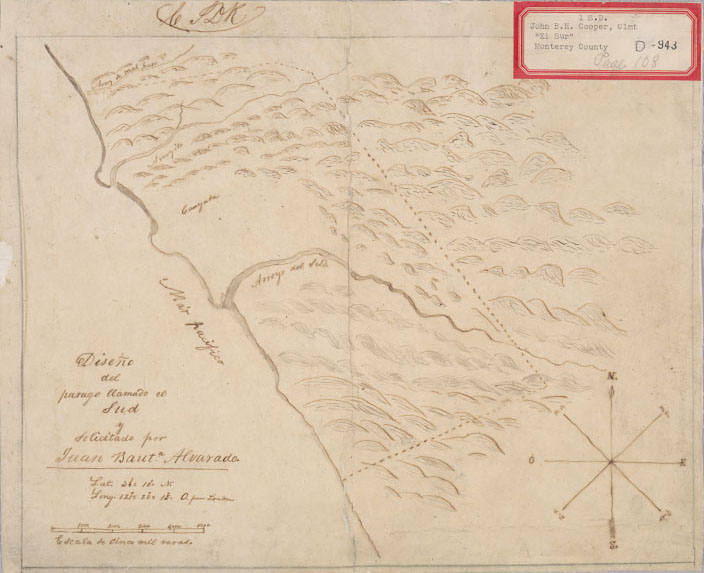
Hand-drawn diseño (map) of Rancho El Sur supporting Juan Bautista Alvarado's patent claim.

Rancho El Sur was a 8,949.06-acre (36.22 km^{2}) Mexican land grant in present-day Monterey County, California, on the Big Sur coast given in 1834 by Governor José Figueroa to Juan Bautista Alvarado. The grant extended from the mouth of Little Sur River inland about 2.5 miles (4.0 km) over the coastal mountains and south along the coast past the mouth of the Big Sur River to Cooper's Point. In about 1892, the rancho land plus an additional 3,000 acres (1,200 ha) of resale homestead land was divided into two major parcels. The southern 4,800 acres (1,900 ha) became the Molera Ranch, later the foundation of Andrew Molera State Park. The northern 7,100 acres (2,900 ha) form the present-day El Sur Ranch.

== History ==
Before the arrival of Europeans, the land was occupied by the Esselen people, who resided along the upper Carmel and Arroyo Seco Rivers, and along the Big Sur coast from near present-day Hurricane Point to the vicinity of Vicente Creek in the south. The native people were heavily affected by the establishment of three Spanish Missions near them from 1770 to 1791. The native population was decimated by disease, including measles, smallpox, and syphilis, which wiped out 90 percent of the native population, and by conscript labor, poor food, and forced assimilation. Most of the Esselen people's villages within the current Los Padres National Forest were left largely uninhabited.

=== Spanish grant ===
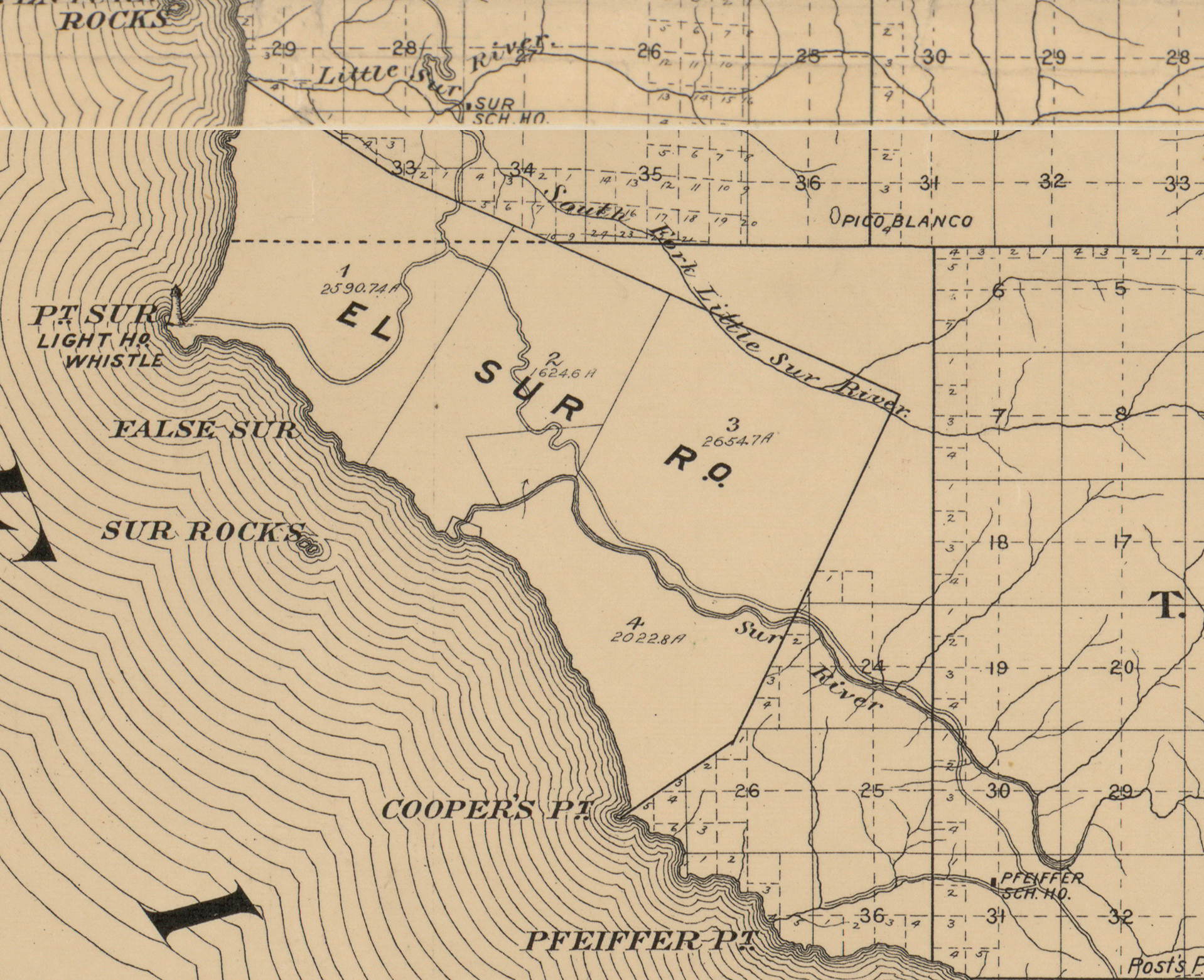
1898 map showing the legal boundaries of Rancho el Sur after Cooper's successful claim.

Alvarado filed a claim for Rancho El Sur on May 14, 1834 in which he stated that he had first petitioned for a provisional grant on August 12, 1830, and repeated his petition on February 26, 1831. He stated that he maintained "at this time ... more than three hundred head of large cattle and nearly an[sic] hundred horses, all my own property, and have built a house and pens."

Mexican Governor José Figueroa granted Rancho El Sur comprising two square leagues of land (8,949.06-acre (36.22 km^{2})) on the Big Sur coast to Juan Bautista Alvarado (1809–1882) in 1834. Cooper was apparently involved in managing the ranch as early as 1834, when he negotiated an agreement with Job Dye to permit him to raise mules on the property.

In 1840, Alvarado traded ownership of Rancho El Sur to Captain John B. R. Cooper in exchange for the more accessible and readily farmed 22,000-acre (89.03 km^{2}) Rancho Bolsa del Potrero y Moro Cojo north of present-day Castroville in the Salinas Valley.

When Mexico ceded California to the United States following the Mexican-American War, the 1848 Treaty of Guadalupe Hidalgo provided that the land grants would be honored. But California passed the Land Act of 1851, which required grantees to provide legal proof of their title. Cooper filed a claim for Rancho El Sur with the Public Land Commission in 1852 and he received the legal land patent after years of litigation in 1866.

Cooper never actually lived at the ranch, but various family members and ranch workers continuously occupied it from 1840 onward. In the 1850s Cooper landed smuggled goods at the mouth of Big Sur River to avoid the heavy customs charges levied by the Americans at Monterey.

=== Next generation ===
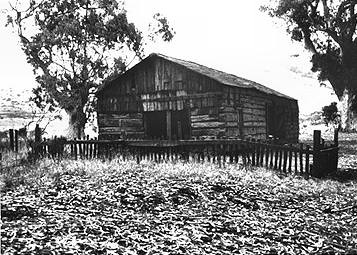
The Cooper cabin, originally built in April or May 1861, is the oldest surviving structure in Big Sur.

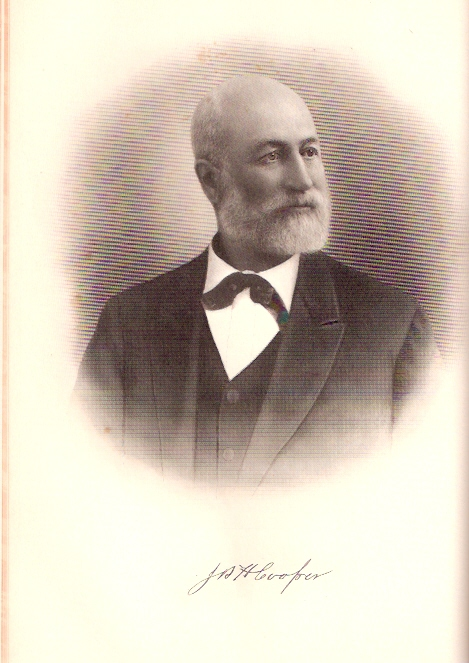
John Bautista Henry Cooper

On March 12, 1871, John B.R. Cooper's 40 year old son John B.H. married 18 year old Martha Brawley, a cousin of Abraham Lincoln, at the San Carlos Cathedral. After John B.R. Cooper's death in 1872, the ranch was divided into four parts: son John B.H. Cooper received the northern-most section. John B.R. Cooper's widow Maria Encarnación Vallejo received section two of the land. Their two surviving daughters, Anna Maria de Guadalupe Cooper and Francisca Guadalupe Amelia Cooper, received sections three and four.

John B.H. Cooper became a Monterey County supervisor and managed Rancho Bolsa del Potrero y Moro Cojo between present-day Castroville and Tembladero Slough. He later moved to San Francisco while continuing to own the ranch. J.B.H. Cooper and his wife Martha had four children: Alice, John, Abelarde, and Alfred. J.B.H. built a new home on Rancho El Sur for his family but died on June 21, 1899, soon after its completion, and before he could live there. Martha Brawley Cooper received 2,591 acres (1,049 ha) of her husband's 7,000 acres (2,800 ha) estate. By 1904, she had added 900 acres (360 ha) to her share of the ranch.

After her son Alfred died in an automobile accident on September 2, 1913, his two siblings assigned their interest in the estate including his share of the Rancho to their mother, Martha.

=== Molera Ranch ===
John B. H. Cooper's sister Francisca Amelia married Eusebius J. Molera, an engineer and architect born in Spain, on March 28, 1876, in Vallejo, California. She retained her share of the rancho she inherited from her parents. The marriage between the Cooper and Molera families left a legacy marked by their names on notable places throughout the region, including the Cooper-Molera Adobe in Monterey.

Francisca and Eusebius Molera had a son and daughter, Andrew and Frances. Andrew built up a successful dairy operation. His Monterey Jack cheese was especially well-liked. A report in the Monterey Daily Express on June 9, 1911, reported that there was "good demand for the Spanish cheese all over the state." "It is not believed that the cheese is made in any other section of the state. Cheese was manufactured on the ranch from about 1918 to 1931.

Andrew and Frances maintained a residence for most of their lives on Sacramento Street in San Francisco. The census record records their occupation as "farmer" and, indicative or their relative wealth, recorded the presence of a cook and maid living with them. During the time the Cooper family owned the land, they managed it as a cattle ranch and dairy, employing Hispanic and Indian vaqueros. They supported a school and community center. Big Sur pioneer Sam Trotter wrote about attending the "big dance Saturday night at the Cooper hall near the mouth of Big Sur [River] on the Cooper grant."

=== Family sells property ===
In 1928, Henry C. Hunt, a business man from Carmel-by-the-Sea, purchased the northern 8,000 acres (3,200 ha) from John B. H. Cooper's widow, Martha Cooper Hughes (née Brawley) Vasquez, for about $500,000. On November 28, 1931, he announced that he had arranged to lease the remaining 5,000 acres (2,000 ha) from her.

== Modern use ==
The ranch was partitioned into fifteen lots by 1892. The Native American trail along the coast had been improved over time by the homesteaders and ranchers. They improved it until wagons could travel the road from Monterey to Big Sur in less than a day in 1900. It remained impassable in wet weather. The road (now known as the Old Coast Road) was improved by local residents and routed through Rancho El Sur, inland about 1.25 miles (2.01 km) to the meeting of the North and South Forks of the Little Sur River, and then south through the Molera Ranch near the Big Sur River and to Pfeiffer Resort in Sycamore Canyon. Three years later it was extended to about 2 miles (3.2 km) to Post Summit. In 1897, Harold W. Fairbanks and Maynard Dixon traversed the coast over a two-week period. They wrote:

A Spanish grant is located about the mouth of the Sur river. The greed of the Spaniards leading them to this almost inaccessible spot is rather surprising. It is still almost in a state of nature, but roamed over by thousands of cattle. The ranch buildings consist of old sheds and tumble-down adobes peopled with geese, chickens, hogs, calves, and Mexicans of all ages and conditions.

=== Andrew Molera State Park ===
Cooper's daughter, Amelia, married Spanish engineer Eusebio Joseph Molera in 1875. Their son Andrew Molera and his sister Frances inherited the 4,800 acres (1,900 ha) ranch. Andrew was very obese and died of a sudden heart attack in 1931. Frances inherited his portion of the land.

In 1965, almost 100 years after her family gained title, she sold 2,200-acre (890 ha) of the original land grant west of Highway 1 to The Nature Conservancy with the intent it become a state park. She stipulated that the park should be named Andrew Molera State Park in honor of her brother. The conservancy held the beachfront property in trust until the state of California could finance the purchase of the land. She died in 1968. She added provisions to the sale requiring that the land remain relatively undeveloped. When the California state park administration began to propose considerable development for the park, the Nature Conservancy threatened to revoke the sale arrangement, and the state backed down.

The state bought the remainder of the land east of Highway 1 from her estate soon after.

=== El Sur Ranch ===
Lots one through thirteen now comprise the El Sur Ranch. The 7,100 acres (2,873 ha) El Sur Ranch straddles Highway 1 for 6 miles (9.7 km) from the mouth of the Little Sur River to Andrew Molera State Park. It has been owned by the Hill family since 1958, who run a commercial cow-calf operation with about 450 head on the ranch.

== Historic structures ==
- Cooper Cabin. Built for John Cooper in 1861 on his ranch.

== See also ==
- Ranchos of California
- List of Ranchos of California
