= Pico Blanco =

Landform in Monterey County, California

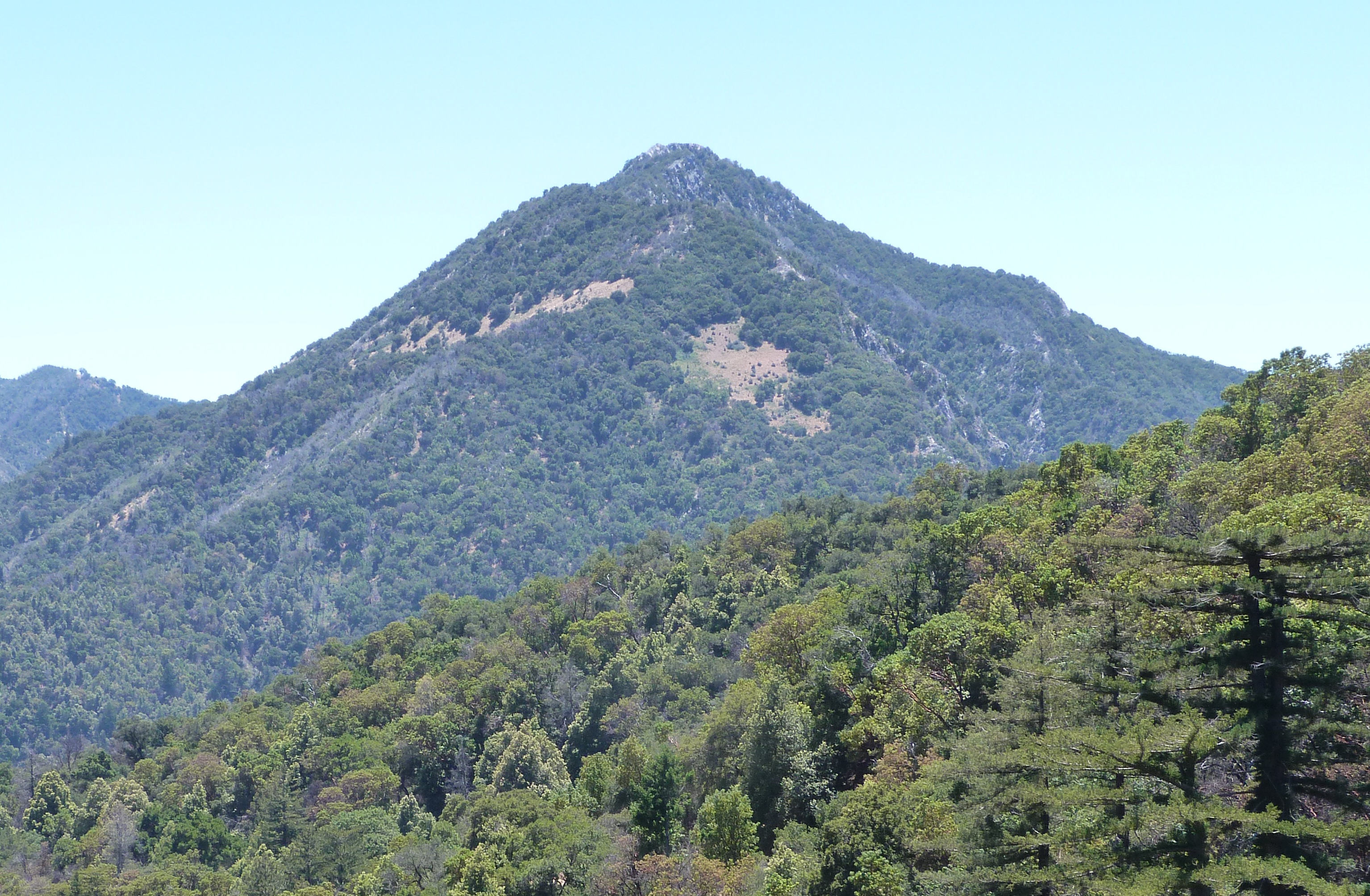
- Pico Blanco

Highest point
- Elevation: 3,694 ft (1,126 m) NAVD 88
- Coordinates: 36°19′07″N 121°48′42″W

Geography
- Location within California
- Location: Monterey County, California, U.S.
- Parent range: Santa Lucia Mountains
- Topo map: USGS Big Sur

Climbing
- Easiest route: Trail hike

Pico Blanco is a peak on the coast of Big Sur in the Santa Lucia Range of the Los Padres National Forest. The Little Sur River and its tributaries almost surround the mountain. The North Fork wraps around the northern flank and eastern edge of the mountain, and the South Fork crosses the mountain to the west and south-west. The mountain is known for an extremely high-grade limestone deposit. The peak and surrounding 2,800 acres (1,100 ha), are owned by the Granite Rock Company of Watsonville, California. The lower western slopes of the mountain are the property of the El Sur Ranch. The Old Coast Road built in the early 1900s cuts across its western flank. The view from its summit allows hikers to see Ventana Double Cone and Kandlbinder Peak to the southeast, as well as a host of other Big Sur peaks: Mt. Manuel, Post Summit, Uncle Sam Mtn., and Cone Peak far to the south. The mountain is central to the creation story of the Esselen people.

== Toponymy ==
Pico Blanco means 'white peak' in the Spanish language. A large, white limestone outcropping on the mountain peak is clearly visible from all directions.

== History ==
=== Esselen people ===
The peak was considered a sacred mountain by the Esselen people from which all life originated. According to their creation story, the world was destroyed in a great flood, and when the waters rose, the summit of Pico Blanco was the only land to remain exposed. According to one version of the legend, an eagle, coyote, and hummingbird, or—based on another, an eagle, crow, raven, hawk, and hummingbird—survived the flood. A magical feather was plucked from the eagle and planted in the ocean to cause the waters to recede, recreating the world.

=== European visit ===
The mountain was seen by J. Smeaton Chase, who traveled on horseback up the coast in 1911, who reported:

Near by, and on my left, stood the lonely rock of Point Sur, its summit hidden in mists; and on the other side rose a striking white mountain called Pico Blanco, the second highest point of the range. It looked strangely white, almost as though it were snow-covered, against the blue of the eastern sky.

=== Survey use ===
The summit of the mountain was the location of a triangulation station built by a survey crew from the U.S. Coast & Geodetic Survey, a predecessor agency of the National Oceanic and Atmospheric Administration. They were charged beginning in about 1931 with modernizing nautical charts of the California Central Coast, which was prone to ship wrecks. The 3,694 feet (1,126 m) peak was a six and a half hour climb from the coast. The observation teams would often have to wait hours for the fog to lift before they could make their observations.

=== Alfred Clark's discovery ===
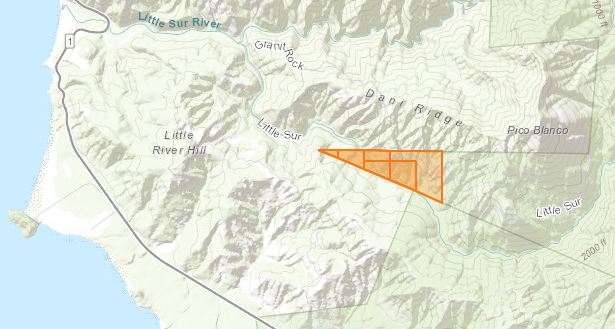
Map of the 1906 land patent claimed by Alfred K. Clark southwest of Pico Blanco.

Alfred King Clark was born in Middlesex, England, on February 21, 1848. He was baptized at 13 months in the Parish of Old St. Pancras. His father George Robert Clark was a stonemason from Tunstall, Staffordshire, England. The family lived on Albion Street in the London neighborhood of Tyburnia, near Hyde Park. In April 1861, his mother Hannah and Al boarded the Adelaide in Liverpool and departed for New York City.

Three weeks after President Abraham Lincoln delivered his address at Gettysburg, Al Clark enlisted in the 5th Pennsylvania Cavalry on December 11, 1863 at age 15. In April 1869, his mother Hannah married John Bowery in Pajaro, California. In 1870 Clark was a farmworker and on September 5, 1871, he became a naturalized American citizen in Castroville, California, where he was working as a carpenter. Big Sur pioneer W.B. Post owned a butcher shop in town. He was first recorded on the Monterey County voter registration roles in 1877 at age 22. On July 12, 1873, Clark married Sarah A. Curtis. No further record of the marriage is available, and they apparently divorced by 1875, when Clark was recorded as a farmer in San Luis Obispo. Clark was farmer and a carpenter in Castroville, Soledad, and Salinas. He occasionally worked as a laborer on road-building crews.

Clark helped Isaac Newton Swetnam build his home at the mouth of Palo Colorado Canyon. Clark built his own homestead on the south fork of the Little Sur River around the turn of the century. He filed a land patent for 158.06 acres (63.96 ha) on June 30, 1906.

A local legend reports that local Native Americans would, at the behest of the Spanish soldiers, travel into the wilderness near the Little Sur River and return with burros laden with high-quality silver ore. The Indians insisted on traveling alone and the Spanish never learned of the silver's location.

Clark reportedly made friends with one of the last surviving members of the Esselen tribe. When near death, the Indian revealed the existence of the silver mine in the vicinity of the Little Sur River. Clark began searching the area for the mines' locations around the turn of the century. He filed a patent for six tracts of land on June 30, 1906. When he found traces of the mine, he sought financial backing in San Francisco and found a partner in Dr. Clarence H. Pearce. Clark began digging a tunnel but after months of fruitless labor, Pearce withdrew his support. Clark persevered, working occasionally as a ranch hand for Alvin Dani, foreman of the nearby Cooper Ranch. Clark was often not seen or heard from for months, and he became a living legend and earned a reputation as crazy and eccentric. The Silver King mine shaft led straight into the mountain 15 feet (4.6 m), then dropped 20 feet (6.1 m), where separate tunnels branched off from it.

J. Smeaton Chase described his encounter with Clark:

In the course of a walk up the stream next morning, I came upon an original who for many years has lived a Robinson Crusoe life in a cabin high up on the cañon wall. His ramshackle dwelling was more shed than house, and I found the ancient himself seated beside it, in a rather alarming state of undress, under the shelter of an umbrella which he had hung obliquely from the roof to intercept the morning sun. With his bright blue eyes, skin originally ruddy but now tanned to Indian hue, and shock of long white hair, he made a most odd appearance. He was talking to himself as I approached, but hailed me hospitably to come in and sit down for a chat. The chatting was a passive affair on my side, for he himself did not cease talking for a moment, and after one or two vain attempts to stop him, I only sat and listened. His great topic was minerals, concerning which he had a theory, new to me, that every metal has a father and a mother. This great discovery had been revealed to him by an old Indian woman, once of these parts, who had bequeathed him a "map," by which, he declared, he was able to make his theory effective. To discount the palpable discrepancy between his apparently poor circumstances and his potential wealth, he explained that he cared nothing for actual money, being content with knowing that he could at any time procure it: a philosophy which, as he appeared to hold it sincerely, was an admirable one, and worthy to be recommended to our captains of finance.

Al Geer and his family befriended Clark and took care of him when he became ill, and again as he aged. Geer paid for Clark to take his one and only plane ride over his property when Clark was in his 90s. Clark gave his land and home to Al Geer before he died on February 11, 1932. Clark told Geer during his last days that he had never found silver, but while digging his mine had found an underground chamber. He said the cavern contained several rooms containing icicle-like formations hanging from the ceiling and similar formations rising from the floor (stalactites and stalagmites). He described flower-like structures on the wall, possibly what is described today as gypsum flowers. These formations are often found in underground limestone formations. He said he saw an underground stream containing white fish. He found a large room with a packed earth floor and well-used mortar holes. The walls were decorated with "elephants with long shaggy hair and curly teeth" and "cats with long sharp teeth." In 2010, the first known remains of a Columbian mammoth with strands of its hair still intact was discovered in a field near Castroville, California, about 34 miles (55 km) miles from Pico Blanco.

Clark said he had sealed the hole to the chamber. The Geer family moved into Clark's house. When Geer finally found the entrance to the mine, the tunnel was caved in and Geer was unable to reopen it. No modern proof of the cavern Clark claimed to have discovered has been found. Clark's former home site and land is within the boundaries of land currently owned by Graniterock of Watsonville, California.

== Hiking and camping ==
Visitors can usually hike from Bottchers Gap into Camp Pico Blanco on the Little Sur River. It is about 7 miles (11 km) hike from Botcher's Gap to Pico Blanco Camp. From the Boy Scout camp hikers can take the western or right fork of a National Forest trail. It climbs Launtz Ridge 11 miles (18 km) to a fork in the trail, where hikers can take the right fork to U.S. Forest Service campgrounds including Pico Blanco Campground, Pico Blanco Camp, and the Coast Road, or veer left 1.1 km (0.68 mi) to Launtz Creek Camp, Pfeiffer Big Sur State Park and the coast 18 km (11 mi) distant.

On July 22, 2016, the Soberanes Fire began and soon swept through the Palo Colorado Canyon and over the road to Bottchers Gap. The fire burned through October 12. During the following winter, heavy rains caused flooding, and Rocky Creek overflowed Palo Colorado Road at milepost 3.3. The road over Rocky Creek was repaired in 2018 but numerous slide-outs further south caused major damage. As of April 2020 the road and the Bottcher's Gap trailhead was closed indefinitely. Monterey County is still seeking funds to repair the road. Hikers may be able to access the Little Sur Trail from the Old Coast Road, but reports as of April 2020 rated the trail from the road as difficult to nearly impassible. When open, it is about a 5 miles (8.0 km) hike to Pico Blanco Camp.

== Limestone deposit ==
Mount Pico Blanco contains a large, pharmaceutical-grade limestone deposit known as the Pico Blanco body and the Hayfield body. It is the only high-grade deposit on the Pacific Coast outside Alaska within three miles of potential marine transportation. Reserves have been estimated to be from 600 million to a billion tons, reportedly the largest in California, and the largest west of the Rocky Mountains. The Graniterock Company of Watsonville, California bought 2,800 acres (1,100 ha), including the peak, and mineral rights to Pico Blanco in 1963. Limestone is a key ingredient in concrete. The limestone also contains a high concentration of calcium, which is used in medicines, cosmetics, food and clear glass.

Graniterock owns two easements across the El Sur Ranch from the Old Coast Road, allowing it access to the limestone deposits. The Dani Ridge access road was developed as a haul road, while the other road which cuts across the north face of Mount Pico Blanco, above the South Fork of the Little Sur River, has not been developed. The deposit lies partly within and partly outside the national forest, complicating administration of the mining rights.

In 1980, Graniterock submitted a five-year plan to the United States Forest Service and requested a permit to begin excavating a 5 acres (2.0 ha) quarry on the portion of land within the Forest Service boundaries. The Forest Service prepared an Environmental Assessment of the plan and recommended some modifications, which Graniterock implemented. Monterey County adopted an initial version of a Local Coastal Plan for Big Sur that permitted some mining on the eastern slopes of the mountain.

Soon after Graniterock obtained the permit in 1983, the California Coastal Commission required Granite Rock to apply for a coastal development permit. Graniterock filed suit in U.S. District Court claiming that the Coastal Commission permit requirement was preempted by Forest Service regulations, by the Mining Act of 1872, and by the Coastal Zone Management Act. The district court denied Graniterock's motion for summary judgment, and dismissed the action.

The Court of Appeals for the Ninth Circuit reversed the lower court's decision, holding that the Coastal Commission permit requirement was preempted by the Mining Act of 1872 and Forest Service regulations. The Coastal Commission appealed to the United States Supreme Court. In their ruling, California Coastal Comm'n v. Granite Rock Co., the court ruled that because Congress specifically disclaimed any intention to preempt preexisting state authority in the Coastal Zone Management Act, even if all federal lands are excluded from the act's definition of "coastal zone," the act does not automatically preempt all state regulation of activities on federal lands. Graniterock still owns the property.
