= El Sur Ranch =

American cattle ranch in California

- Industry: Cow-calf operation
- Predecessor: Rancho El Sur
- Founded: 1955
- Founder: Courtlandt Hill
- Headquarters: Big Sur, California, U.S.
- Area served: United States
- Products: Beef
- Revenue: $243,000 to $760,000
- Owner: James Jerome Hill III
- Number of employees: 2-5
- Website: www.elsurranch.com

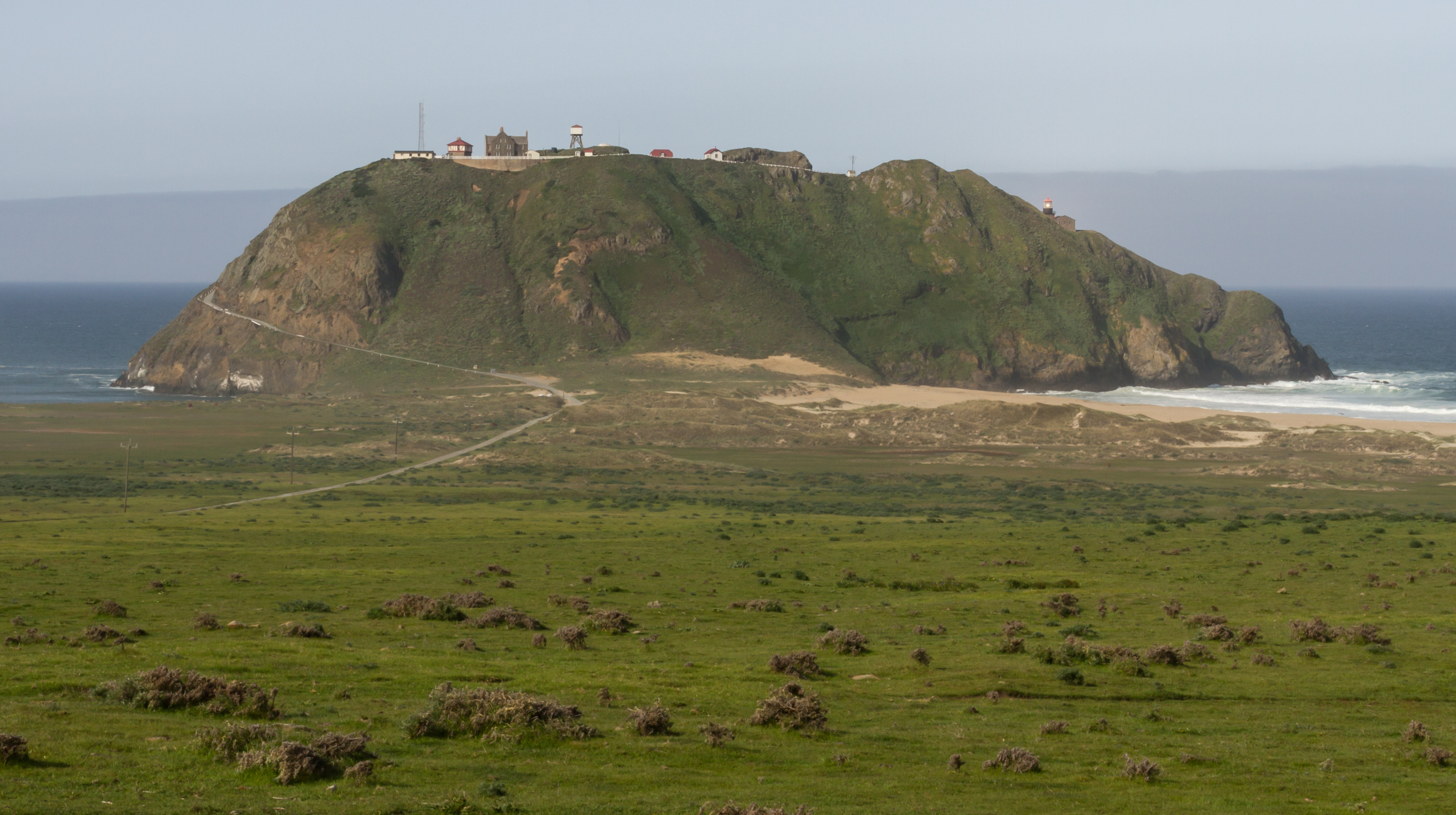
Lands of the El Sur Ranch between Highway 1 and the Point Sur Light Station.

The El Sur Ranch, located on the Big Sur coast of California, has been continuously operated as a cattle ranch since 1834. The approximately 7,100 acres (2,873 ha) ranch straddles Highway 1 for 6 miles (9.7 km) from the mouth of the Little Sur River to the mouth of the Big Sur River and Andrew Molera State Park. Both the ranch and the park originally comprised the Rancho El Sur land grant given in 1834 by Governor José Figueroa to Juan Bautista Alvarado. It has been owned by the Hill family since 1955, who operate a commercial cow-calf operation.

Upon inheriting the ranch while still in college and pressed by increasingly high property taxes, the ranch's current owner James Hill began plans to develop two percent of the property. His plans were protested by Big Sur residents whose efforts persuaded the California Coastal Commission to deny his permit. In 1997, after being denied a permit to build a 200-room hotel at the mouth of Little Sur River, he agreed to a conservation easement covering the western-most parcel of land, at a cost of $11 million to California taxpayers. Most of this parcel is visible from Highway 1. The land to the west of the highway has historically used water from wells drilled in 1949 and 1984 near the Big Sur River. Hill has sought to increase water drawn from the wells to levels that according to one conservation group might harm endangered steelhead trout.

== Location ==
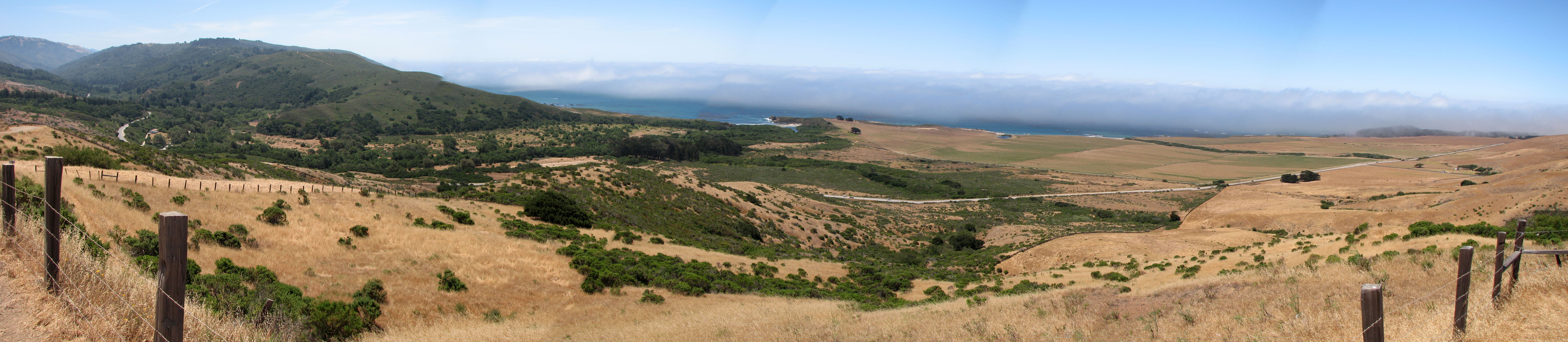
Looking west from Old Coast Road. Andrew Molera State Park on the left includes the Big Sur River down to where it meets the Pacific in the middle of the picture. The land to the front within the fence to the coast is part of the El Sur Ranch.

The original Spanish land Rancho El Sur land grant was partitioned on March 21, 1891. John B.H. Cooper's sister Francisca Guadalupe Amelia Cooper inherited the southern portion of Rancho El Sur. When she died, her two children Andrew J. and Francisca (known as Frances) Molera inherited the land, although they lived their adult lives in San Francisco. The ranch became known as the Molera Ranch.

The approximately 7,100 acres (2,873 ha) El Sur Ranch comprises 13 of the original parcels. The ranch includes 12% of the private land in Big Sur. It straddles 6 miles (9.7 km) of Highway 1 stretching south from Hurricane Point, north of the mouth of the Little Sur River, to near the Big Sur River in Andrew Molera State Park, and it reaches 2.5 miles (4.0 km) inland over the coastal mountains into the south fork of the Little Sur valley to the border of the Los Padres National Forest.

== Etymology ==
The Spanish referred to the vast, relatively unexplored, coastal region to the south of their capital Monterey as el país grande del sur, meaning "the big country of the south". This was often shortened to el sur grande. The two major rivers were named El Rio Grande del Sur and El Rio Chiquito del Sur.

The first recorded use of the name "el Sur" (meaning "the South") was on a map of Rancho El Sur land grant given by Governor José Figueroa to Juan Bautista Alvarado on July 30, 1834. The first American use of the name "Sur" was by the United States Coast Survey in 1851, which renamed a point of land that looked like an island and was shaped like a trumpet, formerly known as "Morro de la Trompa" and "Punta que Parece Isla" during Spanish times, to Point Sur. The island was later graded to provide flat land for the Point Sur Light Station.

== History ==
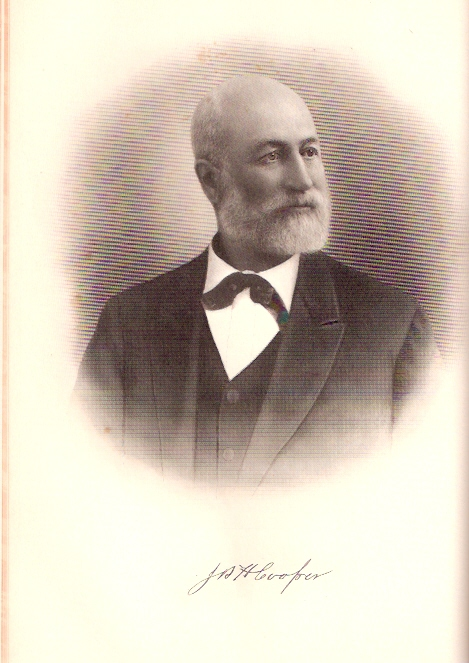
John Baptist Henry Cooper (1831 - 1899) inherited a portion of Rancho El Sur from his father, John Bautista Rogers Cooper. This later became the El Sur Ranch.

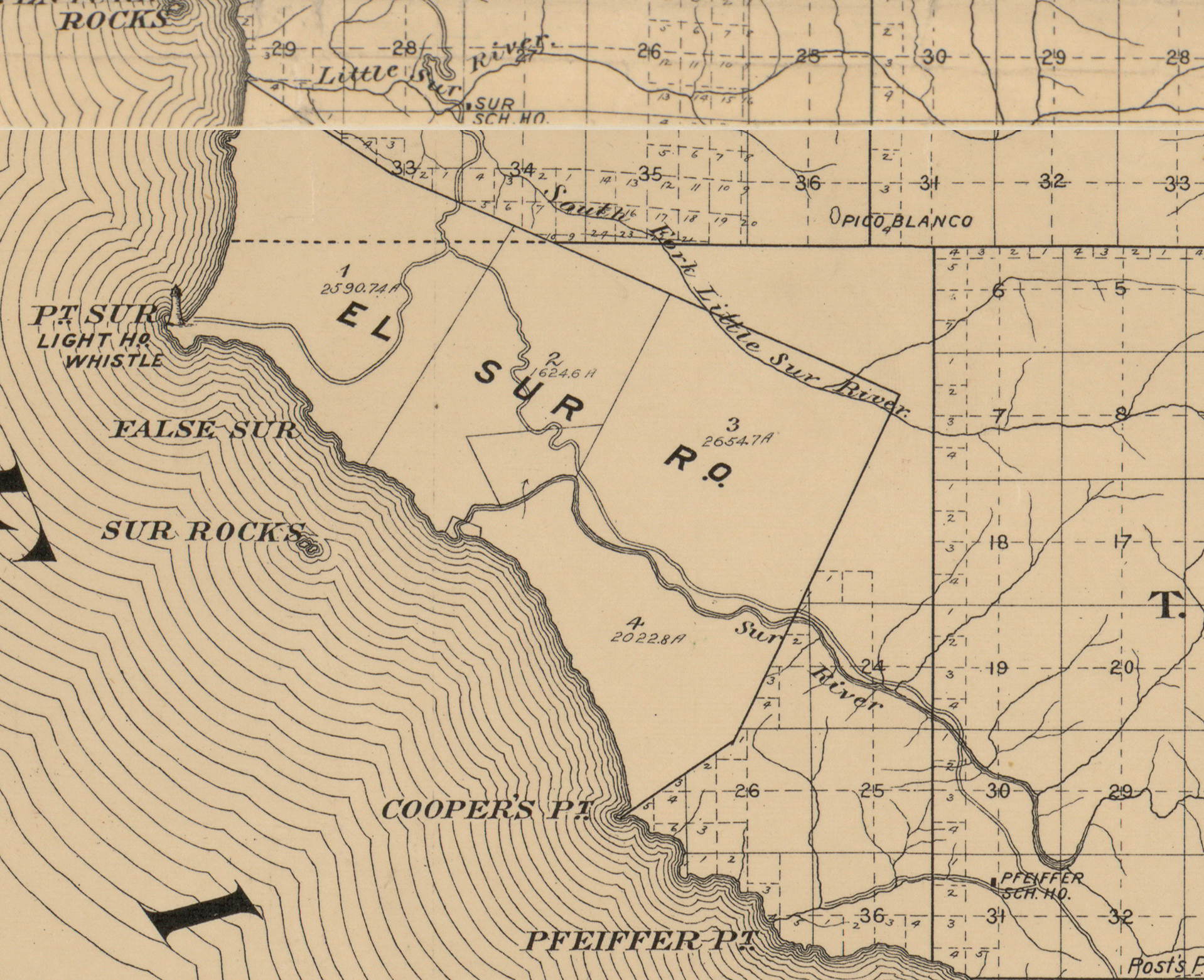
1898 map showing the legal boundaries of Rancho el Sur after Cooper's successful claim.

Before the arrival of Europeans, the land was occupied by the Esselen people, who resided along the upper Carmel and Arroyo Seco Rivers, and along the Big Sur coast from near present-day Hurricane Point to the vicinity of Vicente Creek in the south. The native people were heavily affected by contact with Europeans, who established three Spanish Missions near them from 1770 to 1791. The Spanish forcibly assimilated the Indians, requiring them to labor in the mission fields, while feeding them an inadequate and foreign diet.

The native population was further decimated by diseases for which they had no immunity, including influenza, measles, tuberculosis, gonorrhea, and dysentery, which wiped out 90 percent of their people. Most of the Esselen people's villages within the current Los Padres National Forest were uninhabited by around 1820.

Spanish Governor José Figueroa granted two square leagues (totaling 8,949 acres (36.22 km^{2})) of land named Rancho El Sur in 1834 to Juan Bautista Alvarado, who later traded it to his uncle Juan Bautista Rogerio Cooper in exchange for Rancho Bolsa del Potrero. As required by the Land Act of 1851, Cooper filed a claim for Rancho El Sur with the Public Land Commission in 1852, and after year of litigation he received the legal land patent in 1866.

John B.R. Cooper married Geronima de la Encarnacion Vallejo. They had six daughters and one son. Their son John Baptist Henry Cooper helped his father with the cattle business on Rancho El Sur. He also successfully managed other lands owned by the family in the Salinas Valley. His sister Frances Molera inherited the southern half of Rancho El Sur.

After John B. R. Cooper's death in 1872, the ranch was divided into four parts: their son John Bautista Henry Cooper received the first section. On March 12, 1871, 40 year old John B. H. Cooper had married 18 year old Martha Brawley in 1871, a cousin of Abraham Lincoln, at the San Carlos Cathedral. John B. R. Cooper's widow Maria Encarnación Vallejo also received one-quarter of the land, and their two surviving daughters, Anna Maria de Guadalupe Cooper and Francisca Guadalupe Amelia Cooper, received the remaining portions.

John Baptist Henry Cooper built a new home on Rancho El Sur Ranch but died soon after its completion on June 21, 1899, before he could move in, leaving the 10,000 acres (4,000 ha) ranch to his wife and children. Martha (Brawley) Cooper received 2,591 acres (1,049 ha) of her the land, and over time bought the remainder from her husband's two sisters. She sold 5,000 acres in 1928 to businessman Harry Cole Hunt of Carmel-by-the-Sea. He had been president of the Tidewater Oil Company and a director of Dabney and Hogan Petroleum Companies. He was the founder of Del Monte Properties and with his wife Jane Selby (née Hayne) owned the El Sur Ranch.

== Modern ownership ==
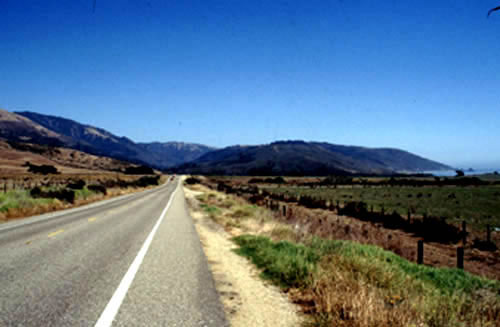
The El Sur Ranch straddles Highway 1 for six miles. It was originally part of the Rancho El Sur land grant.

The current owner, James Jerome Hill III, is descended from railroad magnate James J. Hill. His son Louis W. Hill bought considerable land in Pebble Beach, California when it was first developed by the Pacific Improvement Company with the intent to attract the wealthy. The family enjoyed the mild winters on the California Central Coast and beginning in 1910 often wintered there. Louis' son Cortlandt Taylor Hill built a vacation home in Pebble Beach. Cortlandt married Blanche Lucille Ellen (née Wilbur) in 1934. She had previously been married to George Randolph Hearst, the eldest son of publishing tycoon William Randolph Hearst. The elder Hearst had nurtured an ambition to buy large areas of the Big Sur coast at one time. Blanche married Cortlandt Hill on March 31, 1934, at the Ritz Tower on Park Avenue in New York City. They divorced in 1952. Cortlandt married Marion Ballaire in 1953. They had three children, including James Jerome Hill III, named after his uncle and great-grandfather.

In 1955 Cortlandt bought the El Sur Ranch from Harry C. Hunt. His son James spent many weekends and summer vacations on the ranch. In 1967, the ranch was subject to a precedent-making trespassing appellate court case prosecuted by Leon Panetta's brother, Joseph R. Panetta. Cortlandt and Marion were divorced in March 1972. Cortlandt married Blanche C. Hauserman (née Christian) on January 9, 1973. She had opened the first commercial building and ski shop at Vail Ski Resort, and both were enthusiastic leaders in the snow skiing community.

=== Conservation easement ===
When Cortlandt died in Monterey on March 28, 1978, his only child James inherited the approximately 7,100 acres (29 km^{2}) ranch and other family properties while he was still in college. James looked for income producing opportunities to offset taxes. He contracted with a San Francisco architectural firm to develop a plan for the property that would produce income but keep it undivided and devoted to cattle ranching. Hill initially proposed a 200-room hotel, conference center, and restaurant on land west of Highway 1 adjacent to the Little Sur River, and a cabin complex on the east side hidden from the highway. The plan used only 2% of the land.

The California Coastal Conservancy worked with Hill to reduce the environmental impact. He later submitted a revised plan to Monterey County for a 100-room hotel in three or four buildings and a 200-seat restaurant, plus 98 private home sites situated so they could not be seen from Highway 1. He also sought a conservation easement on 3,000 acres (1,200 ha). The Monterey County Board of Supervisors approved the plan in 1984.

In August 1983, the California Coastal Conservancy announced an agreement to pay Hill $1 million for a conservation and scenic easement on 1,400 acres (570 ha) on the east side of Highway 1, south of Little Sur River, and to purchase 1,200 acres (490 ha). Hill also agreed to donate the cost of a conservation easement on another 1,100 acres (450 ha). Hill retained the right to develop the remaining 3,400 acres (1,400 ha). There was considerable local opposition to the plan. Fifty Big Sur residents attended a meeting of the Coastal Commission in April 1985 to protest the deal with the Coastal Conservancy. The Big Sur Land Trust also voiced their opposition. The Big Sur Local Use Plan was under consideration by the California Coastal Commission, and the supervisors withdrew the plan. Hill's development deal was voted down by the commissioners in a vote of 10 to 1.

The fight over Hill's development rights played a role in tightening rules in the Big Sur Local Coastal Plan. The county conducted additional hearings and modified the land use plan to further restrict larger developments. The Coastal Commission accepted the revised land use plan and rejected Hill's application for a permit. The amended Big Sur Local Coastal plan was approved by the Coastal Commission on April 10, 1986. The Big Sur land use policies are some of the most restrictive local-use standards in California, and are widely regarded as one of the most restrictive development protections anywhere.

In 1991, Hill began negotiating with the Big Sur Land Trust for a conservation easement on 3,252 acres (1,316 ha) of land visible to the public, including all of the lands visible from Highway 1. Monterey County eventually agreed to pay $11.5 million to Hill for the conservation easement. This was almost half of the $25 million set aside by a 1988 parks bond initiative (Proposition 70) to preserve Big Sur land. The payment was the largest in California history. In exchange, Hill and any future owner gave up the right to develop the acres included in the easement. It gave Hill a one-time tax credit of $4.5 million, the difference between the prior market value and the value after the ability to develop the land was removed. He also received the benefit of an ongoing reduction in property taxes. Hill still has the right to develop the remaining 3,450 acres (1,400 ha) within the strict limitations imposed by the Big Sur Land Use Plan. The El Sur Ranch comprises 14 parcels, and only a single parcel astride Highway 1 is subject to the conservation easement.

=== Current operations ===
Hill continues to run a commercial cow-calf operation with about 450 head on the ranch. The cattle graze on natural grasslands in the mountains on the east side of Highway 1 during the winter, spring, and summer, until the pasture is no longer suitable. The cattle are then relocated to eleven fenced and irrigated fields totaling 267 acres (108 ha) on the west side of Highway 1. Hill lives in the family residence in Pebble Beach, California, on the Monterey Peninsula. Public records variously estimate Hill Properties grosses from $243,000 to $760,000 a year from its land, cattle and other operations. Business expenses are unknown as are his net profits.

=== Water rights litigation ===
In 1905, Martha Cooper Vasquez, John B. H. Cooper's widow, was granted a permit to use water from the Big Sur River to irrigate land along the coast. In 1928, after Harry Hunt bought the land, he began raising alfalfa, barley, corn, potatoes and carrots using water diverted from the Big Sur River. In 1938 he returned to raising feed for cattle. Hill irrigates 267 acres (108 ha) with water from two wells, the first drilled in 1949, and the second in 1984, near the Big Sur River.

In 1990, the California Department of Water Resources filed a complaint with the California State Water Resources Control Board stating that the El Sur Ranch's wells were drawing water from the underflow of the Big Sur River, and Hill was required to apply for a Water Right Permit. Hill has supplied studies that contradict the state's findings, and has been engaged in ongoing litigation and negotiations with the California Department of Fish and Wildlife. He is seeking a permit to use a maximum of 1,615 acre-feet per year, based on a 20-year rolling average of 1,200 acre-feet per year. The California Department of Parks and Recreation, the California Department of Fish and Game, and the California Sportfishing Protection Alliance claim the water Hill is diverting is reducing the flow of the Big Sur River and harming the threatened steelhead habitat.

Hill is striving to preserve his right to use water that the ranch must have access to if it is to continue operations. The ranch has relied on water from the Big Sur River or from permitted wells near the river from the time of the original land grant.

=== Community service ===
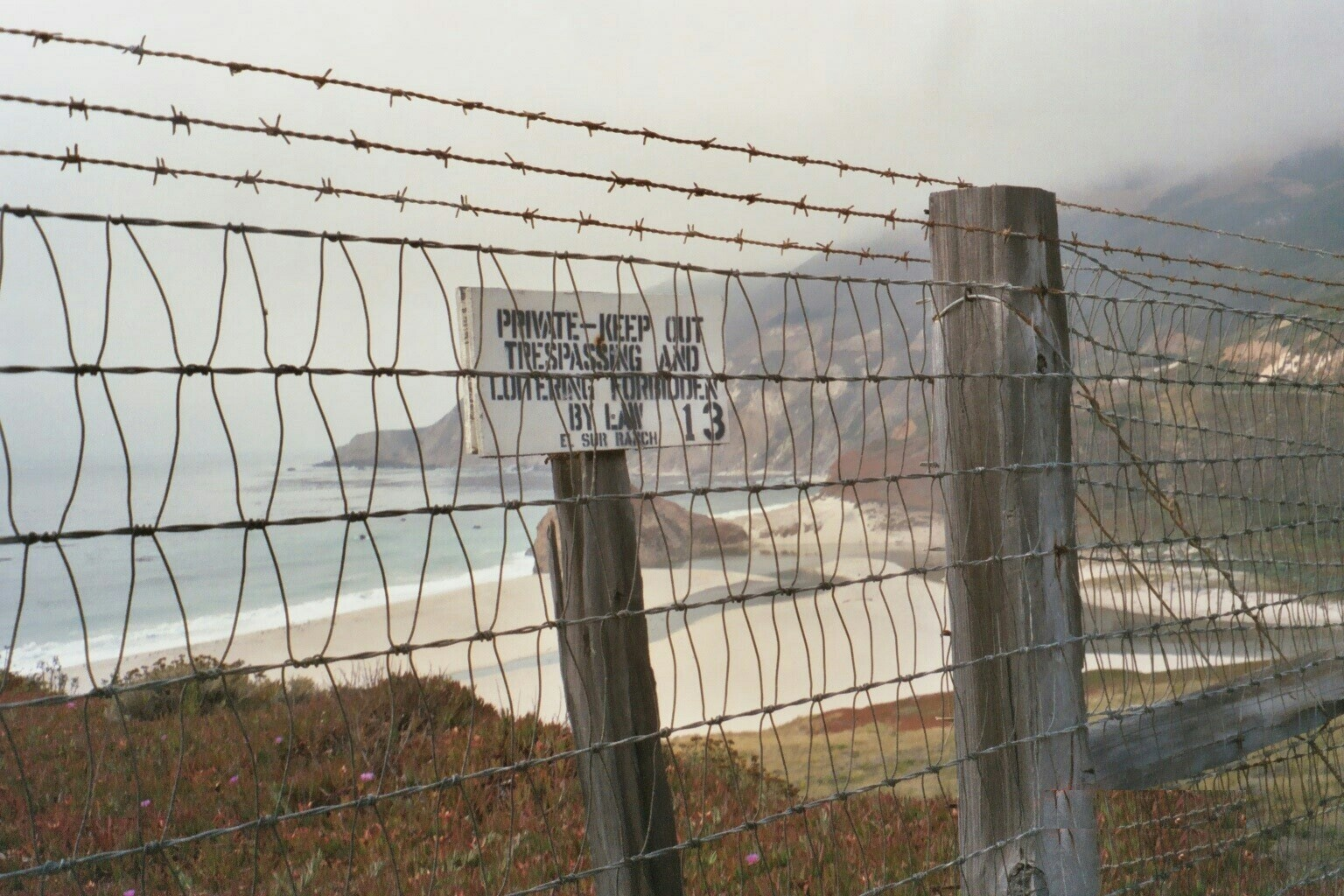
Fence along Highway 1 enclosing the beach at the mouth of the Little Sur River

Hill has allowed fire services to use his ranch as a base of operations during fires. During the Soberanes Fire in 2016, a fire retardant base operated out of the ranch. He has also allowed helicopters to draw water from his ponds for firefighting efforts. Hill was given an honorary lifetime membership in the Big Sur Volunteer Fire Brigade to recognize the ranch's contribution of resources and personnel in fighting the Basin Complex Fire in 2008. The ranch has supported fire fighting efforts in 1977, 1986, 1997, 1999, 2000, 2006, 2007, 2008 and 2016. It also supports the Big Sur Health Center.

Hill privately donated over $100,000 to buy and refurbish a surplus MRAP for use by the Del Rey Oaks and neighboring police departments. Hill is a volunteer on the city's police reserve force. He agreed through his company NorthTree Fire International to maintain the vehicle for five years.

The Ventana Wildlife Society has been engaged since 1996 in a program to restore the California condor population from near extinction. Hill allows the society to use a ranch road to deliver animal carcasses to a location outside the ranch for the condors to eat. Hill later established a second feeding location near by on his land where he has brought carcasses of his own cattle to feed the condors. In 2011, he told a reporter that "Over the last six or seven years, we've delivered 30,000 to 40,000 pounds of carcasses." To prevent the Condors from ingesting lead, Hill has also instructed his employees to use copper bullets when protecting the cattle from predators.

== Little Sur River beach access ==
The beach was subject to a state appellate court case which found that very brief overnight camping itself was not trespassing. In Gion vs. City of Santa Cruz, 2 Cal. 3d 29 (1970), the Supreme Court of California held that "certain coastal property who allowed the public to use the property for recreational purposes over a period of years thereby impliedly dedicated property rights to the public." The legal argument established a method by which the courts could require land owners to allow public access to their property. The concept of "implied dedication by public use" is predicated on prior public access having created de facto public use. If the owner fails to post "No Trespass" signs and allows the public to cross the private property to fish, swim, picnic, and view the ocean, the state can find that an easement for public access for recreational purposes exists.

California passed a law supporting a coastal trail within view of the ocean. The El Sur Ranch is already traversed by the Little Sur Trail which begins within the boundaries of the ranch, along with the Old Coast Road and Highway 1. Hill is opposed to another public right-of-way through the ranch.

At the mouth of the Little Sur river are some of the largest sand dunes on the Big Sur coast. The mouth of the Little Sur River, the sand dunes, and the mile-long Little Sur River beach are within the boundaries of the El Sur Ranch. Hill maintains a secure fence and has prominently posted no trespassing signs on the fence along Highway 1 as suggested by legal precedent. While the beach below the mean high tide line is open to the public, the law does not permit individuals to trespass on private property to reach the public beach. Individuals who trespass to reach the beach have been cited.
