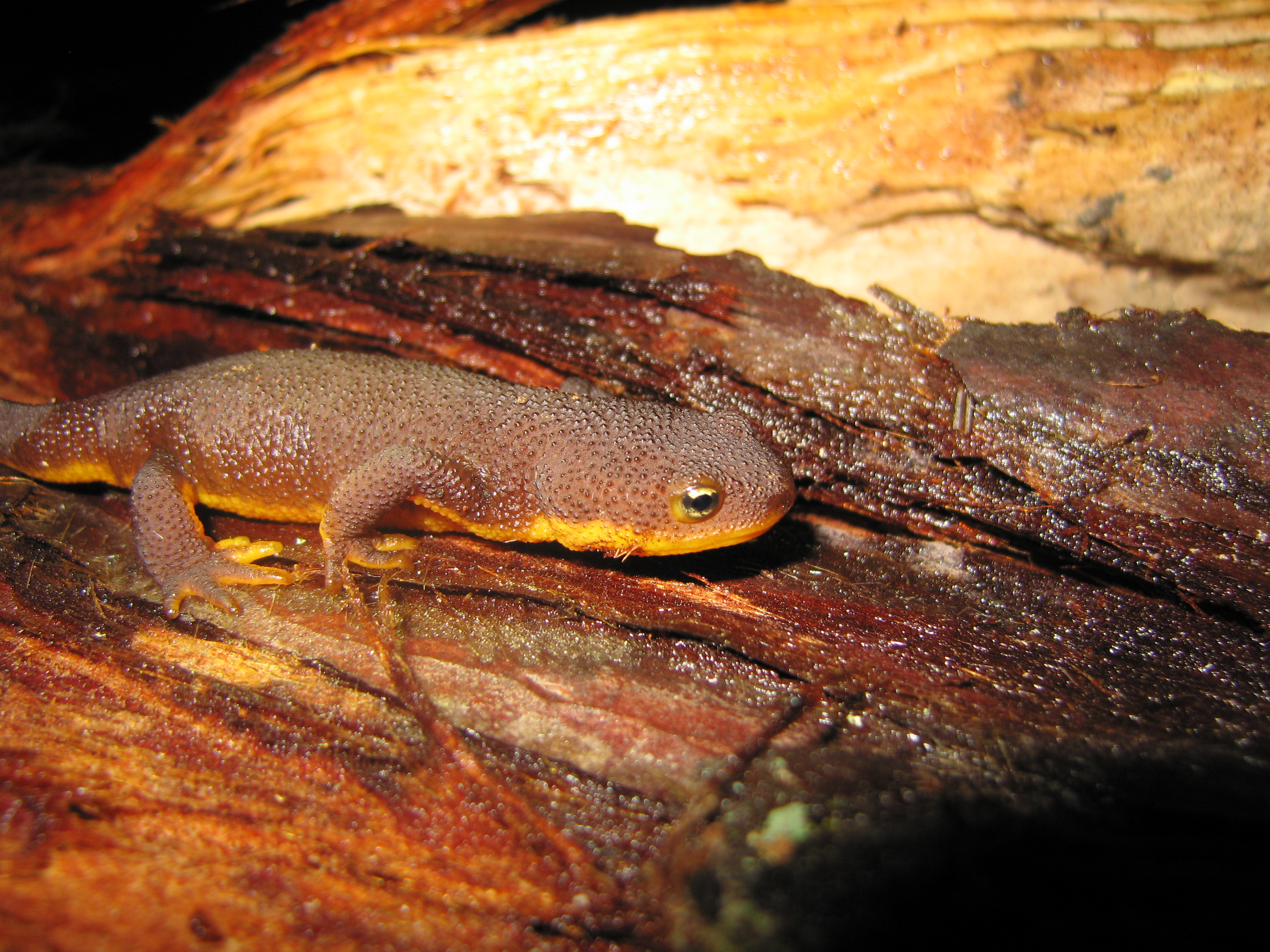

Scientific classification
- Kingdom: Animalia
- Phylum: Chordata
- Class: Amphibia
- Order: Urodela
- Family: Salamandridae
- Genus: Taricha
- Species: T. torosa
- Subspecies: T. t. torosa

Trinomial name
- Taricha torosa torosa (Rathke, 1833)

= Coast Range newt =

Subspecies of amphibian

The Coast Range newt (Taricha torosa torosa) is a subspecies of the California newt (Taricha torosa). It is endemic to California, from Mendocino County south to San Diego County and poisonous if eaten.

== Distribution ==
It is native to the California coast, California Coast Ranges, the western Transverse Ranges, and the northern Peninsular Ranges. The other subspecies of Taricha torosa, is T. t. sierrae, which ranges in the Sierra Nevada.

=== Habitat ===
California Coast Range newts can be found in coastal areas and coastal range mountains in oak forests, woodlands, or rolling grasslands. In the terrestrial phase they live in moist to dry habitats under woody or leafy debris, in rock crevices, or in animal burrows. In the aquatic phase they are found in ponds, reservoirs, lakes and slow-moving streams.

== Description ==
California Coast Range newts have squat, stocky, and muscular bodies with legs that protrude straight out sideways from the body, and bend downward at the elbows. The short neck and head are approximately the same width and the nose narrows to a point. Large protuberant eyes are set at the side of the head.

They are 12.5–20 cm (4.9-7.8 in) long from the nose to the tip of the tail. Males are slightly larger.

Scientists believe these newts may live as long as 20 years or more.

=== Behavior ===
Terrestrial except in breeding season when they become aquatic, California Coast Range newts are gregarious and aggressive. They make clicking and often yelping sounds when disturbed.

When threatened, a newt assumes a defensive posture known as the Unken Reflex in which it holds its head up and points its tail straight out to display its brightly-colored ventral side, while at the same time secreting toxin from its skin glands. This is probably a warning to would-be predators that the newt is toxic and dangerous to eat. The warning color display is called aposematic coloration.

=== Diet and feeding ===
Their diet consists of small invertebrates such as worms, snails, slugs, insects and insect eggs, and amphibian larvae. They are known to be cannibalistic if other foods are in short supply. Newts capture prey by projecting out their tongue which has an adhesive texture.

The main native predator of the California Coast Range newt is the common garter snake (Thamnophis sirtalis), some of which have apparently developed a genetic resistance or immunity to tetrodotoxin.

==== Reproduction ====
Breeding takes place for 6–12 weeks during the rainy season which normally starts in December. Both sexes generally migrate back to the same water area where they hatched with males reaching the sites a few weeks before females. During courtship the male climbs onto the back of the female, clasps her tightly, rubs his chin over her nose, flutters his tail, and strokes her cloaca, a behavior called amplexus. The nuptial pads that males develop in the breeding season help them to hang onto the female. After about an hour of amplexus, the male deposits his spermatophore on the substrate. The female moves over it, and picks it up with her cloaca. Over several days she will lay three to six spherical egg sacs which she attaches to underwater rocks or plants. Each egg sac contains from seven to about forty eggs and the gelatinous membrane covering the eggs contains poisonous tetrodotoxin. If the adult newts have not cannibalized the egg masses, larvae usually hatch after 14–21 days. However, incubation may go on for up to 52 days depending on food availability and temperature of the water—the colder the water, the longer the incubation.

Newt larvae resemble tadpoles with legs. They have bushy gills in younger developmental stages, balancer organs, and well-developed tails that extend forward to the shoulder area. They are pale yellow and have two dark bands on their backs. They metamorphose into adults in three to six weeks. West coast newts, unlike east coast, do not have an eft stage between larva and adult.

=== Adaptation ===
The Coastal Range newt produce a potent poison called tetrodotoxin from specialized glands in their skin. Ingestion of this poison by handling or eating them causes severe neurological symptoms and, in some instances, death from respiratory or cardiac failure. The toxin found in juveniles is several times more potent than that in adults.

== Conservation ==
Taricha torosa torosa is listed as a species of special concern in California but has no federal conservation status. In California, it is illegal to sell the Coastal Range newt in pet shops.

They are susceptible to stress from loss and degradation of habitat, and especially in the Santa Monica Mountains from predation of eggs and larvae by introduced mosquitofish (Gambusia affinis) and crayfish (Procambarus clarkia).

Large numbers of California Coast Range newts move together in breeding season, during or after rains, often traveling across roadways and highways. During the breeding season, some residents and local governments close roads to protect migrating newts and salamanders from becoming roadkill. A park in Contra Costa County in California posts a drive through the park with this notice: During wet weather conditions, Southpark Drive will be closed to protect migrating newts.
