= Rancho Bolsa del Potrero y Moro Cojo =

Mexican land grant in California

Coordinates: 36.760°N 121.760°W

Rancho Bolsa del Potrero y Moro Cojo (or Pocket of the Pasture and the Lame Moor and La Sagrada Familia or The Holy Family) was a 6,916-acre (27.99 km^{2}) Mexican land grant in the northern Salinas Valley, in present-day Monterey County, California. Tradition holds that Lame Moor refers to a lame, black (moor) horse found in the property.

It was given in 1822 by Governor Pablo Vicente de Solá to Joaquín de la Torre. The grant was bounded on the north by Tembladero Slough and in the south by present-day Castroville.

== History ==
Joaquín de la Torre was a soldier from Spain who was Alcalde of Monterey, and afterwards secretary to Governor Sola. Torre married Maria Los Angeles Cota (1790-1877) in 1803. Torre was granted the rancho, about two square leagues (roughly 8,880 acres), in 1822. Irishman John Milligan (or Mulligan), had a house on the rancho (labeled "Casa de Milligan" on the diseño). de la Torre sold 7,000 acres (2,800 ha) of the rancho to John B.R. Cooper in 1829 for $2000. In 1840, Joaquín de la Torre was granted Rancho Arroyo Seco by Governor Juan B. Alvarado.

In 1840, Cooper traded Rancho Bolsa del Potrero y Moro Cojo for Alvarado's Rancho El Sur. Alvarado was a nephew of Cooper's wife, Encarnacion Vallejo. Alvarado later sold Rancho Bolsa del Potrero y Moro Cojo back to Cooper.

After the Mexican government ceded California to the United States following the Mexican-American War, the 1848 Treaty of Guadalupe Hidalgo provided that land grants would be honored, but required that the owners provide legal proof of their title. As required by the Land Act of 1851, Cooper filed a claim for Rancho Bolsa del Potrero y Moro Cojo with the Public Land Commission on March 30, 1852, and after several years of litigation he was granted a Land patent on December 19, 1859.

== See also ==
- Ranchos of California
- List of Ranchos of California
