= Esselen =

Indigenous American group in northern California

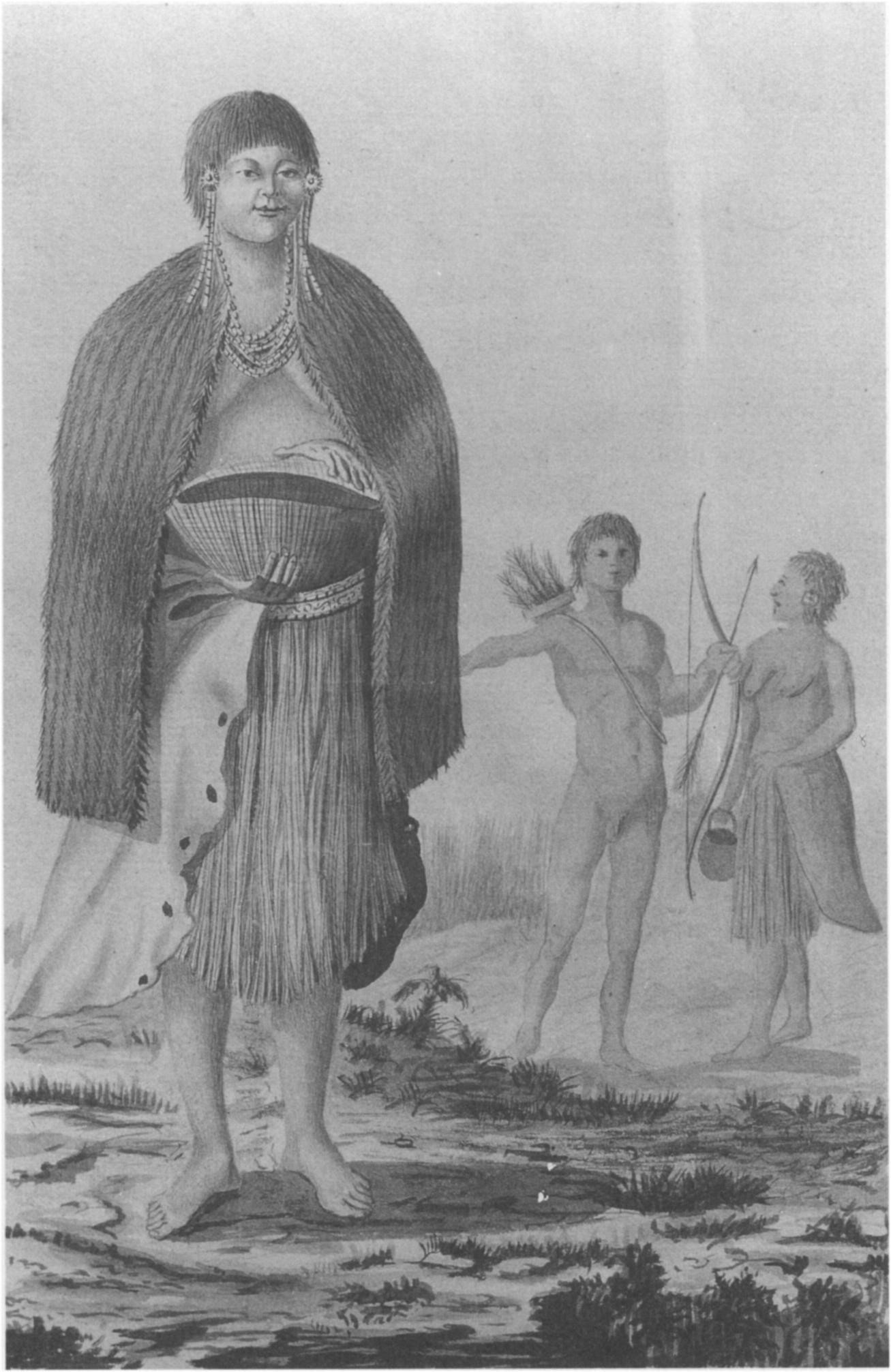
- Esselen native c. 1791, by José Cardero

Total population
- Pre-contact c. 1700, est. 500-1200; as of 2003, about 460

Regions with significant populations
- Central Coast and Northern California

Languages
- English and Spanish, formerly Esselen

Religion
- Catholic, traditional tribal religion

Related ethnic groups
- Rumsen, Ohlone, and Salinan

The Esselen are a Native American people belonging to a linguistic group in the hypothetical Hokan language family, who are Indigenous to the Santa Lucia Mountains of a region south of the Big Sur River in California. Prior to Spanish imperialization, they lived seasonally on the coast and inland, surviving off the plentiful seafood during the summer and acorns and wildlife during the rest of the year.

During the mission period of California history, Esselen children were forcibly baptized by the Spanish Christian priests when they left their villages and relocated as family units to live in the missions where they learned reading, writing, and various trades. The Esselen were required to labor at the three nearby missions, Mission San Carlos, Mission Nuestra Señora de la Soledad, and Mission San Antonio de Padua. Like many Native American populations, their members were decimated at the hands of the Spanish invaders by starvation, forced labor, over work, torture, and diseases that they had no natural resistance to.

Historically, they were one of the smallest Native American populations in California. Various experts estimate there were from 500 to 1,285 individuals living in the steep, rocky region at the time of the invasion of the Spanish. Due to their proximity to three Spanish missions, they were likely one of the first whose culture was virtually eliminated as a result of European invasion and incursion. The people were believed to have been exterminated but some tribal members avoided the invaders, preserving their culture, and emerged from the forest to work in nearby ranches in the early and late 1800s. Descendants of the Esselen are currently scattered, but many still live in the Monterey Peninsula area and nearby regions.

Map of Esselen tribelets

== Origins ==
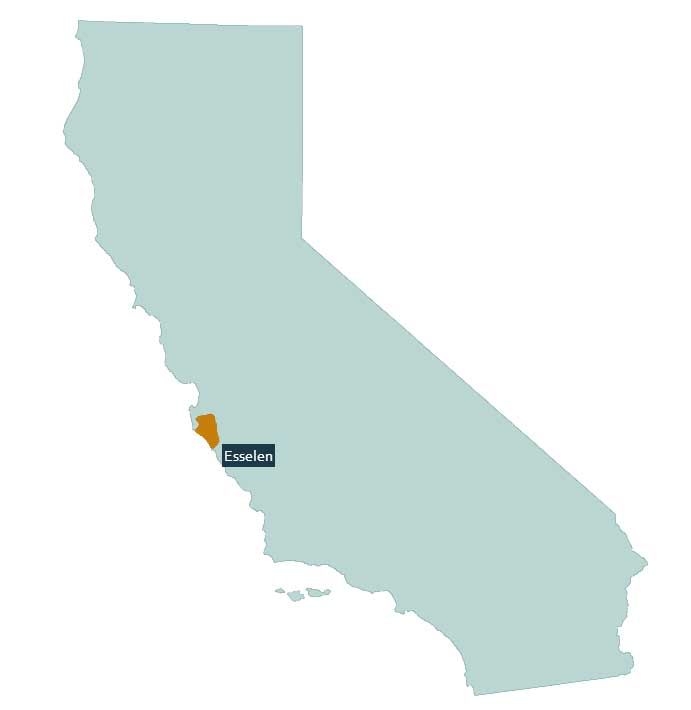
Distribution map of the Esselen language in California prior to contact with European cultures

Archaeological and linguistic evidence indicates that the original people's territory once extended much farther north, into the San Francisco Bay Area, until they were displaced by the entrance of Ohlone people. Based on linguistic evidence, Richard Levy places the displacement at around AD 500. Breschini and Haversat place the entry of Ohlone speakers into the Monterey area prior to 200 B.C. based on multiple lines of evidence. Carbon dating of excavated sites places the Esselen in the Big Sur since circa 2630 BCE. Recently, however, researchers have obtained a radiocarbon date from coastal Esselen territory in the Big Sur River drainage dated prior to 6,500 years ago (archeological site CA-MNT-88).

== Etymology ==
The name Esselen is uncertain. One theory is that it refers to the name of a major native village, possibly Exse'ein, or the place called Eslenes (said to be near the current site of the Mission San Carlos). The village name may be derived from a tribal location known as Ex'selen, "the rock," which is in turn derived from the phrase Xue elo xonia eune, "I come from the rock." "The Rock" may refer to the 361 feet (110 m) tall promontory, visible for miles both up and down the coast, on which the Point Sur Lighthouse is situated.

The Spanish extended the term to mean the entire linguistic group. Variant spellings exist in old records, including Aschatliens, Ecclemach, Eslen, Eslenes, Excelen, and Escelen.

On January 3, 1603, explorer Sebastián Vizcaíno found a deserted Indian village about a mile from what later became the site of the Carmel Mission.

== Language ==
The Esselen language is a language isolate. It is hypothetically part of the Hokan family. The language was spoken in the northern Santa Lucia Range. Prior to contact with European culture, there were between 500 and 1000 speakers. French explorer Jean La Pérouse, who visited Monterey in 1786, recorded 22 words in 1786. He wrote in his journal during the expedition:

The country of the Ecclemachs [Esselen] extends above 20 leagues to the [south]eastward of Monterey. Their language is totally different from all those of their neighbors, and has even more resemblance to the languages of Europe than to those of the Americas. This grammatical phenomenon, the most curious in this respect ever observed on the continent, will, perhaps, be interesting to those of the learned, who seek, in the analogy of languages, the history and genealogy of transplanted nations.

In 1792, Spanish ship captain Dionisio Alcalá Galiano recorded 107 words and phrases. In 1832, Father Felipe Arroyo de la Cuesta recorded another 58 words and 14 phrases at Mission Soledad. The speakers were from the Arroyo Seco area 15 miles (24 km) to the east. The neighboring Rumsen people were fluent in Esselen and they provided de la Cuesta with some language. A total of about 300 words along with some short phrases have been identified. Examples include mamamanej (fire); koxlkoxl (fish); and ni-tsch-ekė (my husband). Isabel Meadows, who also spoke Rumsen, was the last fluent Esselen speaker. She died in 1939.

== Geography ==
The Central California coast in this region is marked by high, steep cliffs and rocky shores, interrupted by small coastal creeks with occasional, small beaches. The mountains are very rugged with narrow canyons. The terrain makes the area relatively inaccessible, long-term habitation a challenge, and limited the size of the native population. The tribe were neighbors to the Salinan people who inhabited present-day southern Monterey County, southern San Benito County, and northern San Luis Obispo county.

=== Locations ===
It is believed there were three Esselen geo-political districts: Imunahan, comprising the central Arroyo Seco watershed; Excelen, including the upper Carmel River; and Ekheahan, including the upper watersheds of the Arroyo Seco and Big Sur Rivers along with a section of the Big Sur coast between Posts and Big Creek further south. The Esselen resided along the upper Carmel and Arroyo Seco River, and along the Big Sur coast from near present-day Hurricane Point to the vicinity of Vicente Creek in the south. The Esselen's territory extended inland through the Santa Lucia Mountains as far as the Salinas Valley. Prior to the arrival of the Spanish, they were hunter-gatherers who resided in small groups with no centralized political authority. Modern researchers believe there were five distinct Esselen districts: Excelen, Eslenahan, Imunahan, Ekheahan, and Aspasniahan. Each are believed to have had a relatively stable resident population.

Jean La Pérouse reported that, "The country of the Ecclemachs [Esselen] extends above 20 leagues to the [south-]eastward of Monterey."

Within each district the people occupied several villages depending on the season and availability of food, water, and shelter. Carbon dating tests of artifacts found near Slates Hot Springs, presently owned by the Esalen Institute, indicate human presence as early as 3500 BC. With easy access to the ocean, fresh water and hot springs, the Esselen people used the site regularly, and certain areas were reserved as burial grounds.

A large boulder with a dozen or more deep mortar bowls worn into it, known as a bedrock mortar, is located in Apple Tree Camp on the southwest slope of Devil's Peak, north of the Camp Pico Blanco. The holes were hollowed out over many generations by Indians who used it to grind the acorns into flour. Other mortar rocks have also been found within the Boy Scout camp at campsites 3 and 7, and slightly upstream from campsite 12, while a fourth is found on a large rock in the river, originally above the river, between campsites 3 and 4.

== Culture ==
Archeological evidence of settlements has been found throughout Esselen territory. Artifacts found at a site in the Tassajara area (archaeological site CA-MNT-44) included bone awls, antler flakers, projectile points including desert side-notched points, and scrapers. Excavation at a second site at the mouth of the Carmel River (archaeological site CA-MNT-63) found more projectile points, a variety of cores and modified flakes, bone awls, a bone tube, a bone gaming piece, and mortars and pestles. Many sites show aesthetic illustrations of numerous pictographs in black, white, and red.

=== Dress and living standards ===
Prior to European invasion, the people wore little clothing. The men were naked year-round and the women and girls may have worn a small apron. In cold weather they may have covered themselves with mud or rabbit or deerskin capes. No evidence of sandals or foot wear has been found.

Invader and later Governor of Alta California Pedro Fages described their dress in an account written before 1775:

Nearly all of them go naked, except a few who cover themselves with a small cloak of rabbit or hare skin, which does not fall below the waist. The women wear a short apron of red and white cords twisted and worked as closely as possible, which extends to the knee. Others use the green and dry tule interwoven, and complete their outfit with a deerskin half tanned or entirely untanned, to make wretched underskirts which scarcely serve to indicate the distinction of sex, or to cover their nakedness with sufficient modesty.

=== Food sources ===
Due to the relative abundance of food resources, the Esselen people never developed agriculture and remained hunter-gatherers. They followed local food sources seasonally, living near the coast in winter, where they harvested rich stocks of mussels, limpets, abalone and other sea life.

Evidence of baskets have been found and were probably the principal item used to furnish households. Basket design included large conical baskets for carrying burdens, hemispherical-shaped cooking bowls, flat trays, and small boat-shaped baskets which may have been seed-beaters.

In the summer and fall they moved inland to harvest one of their staple foods, acorns, which were very abundant throughout Big Sur. They gathered acorns from the black oak, canyon live oak and tanbark oak, primarily on upper slopes above the narrow canyons. They first soaked the acorns in running water to leach the bitter tannin from them. They then ground the acorns using a mortar. Over many years they hollowed out bedrock mortars in granite rock outcroppings that they used to grind plant seeds and acorns into flour. A large bedrock mortar is located in Apple Tree Camp on the southwest slope of Devil's Peak, north of the Camp Pico Blanco. More than 9 feet (2.7 m) across, the boulder contains a dozen or more deep mortar bowls worn into it over several generations. Other mortar rocks have also been found within the Pico Blanco Boy Scout camp at campsites 3 and 7, and slightly upstream from campsite 12, while a fourth is found on a large rock in the river, originally above the river, between campsites 3 and 4. Several Esselen mortars are located in boulders near Clover Basin Camp in Miller Canyon. Once ground, they cooked the acorns into a mush or baked as bread.

Spanish explorer Sebastián Vizcaíno reported,

Their food consists of seeds which they have in great abundance and variety, and of the flesh of game such as deer, which are larger than cows, and bear, and of neat cattle and bisons and many other animals.

They hunted rabbits and deer likely with bow and arrow, although no stone arrow points have been found. Arrows were made of cane and pointed with hardwood foreshafts. They traded acorns, fish, salt, baskets, hides and pelts, shells and beads with other tribes.

=== Dwellings ===
There are virtually no contemporary records of the Esselen people's lives. Researchers believe that they lived in a manner very much like the Ohlone people to the north and the Costonoan people near present-day Monterey. Miguel Constanso, who traveled with Portola's expeditions 175 years later, wrote about the homes of the Indians who lived on the Santa Barbara Channel. He described how they lived in dome-shaped dwellings covered with bundled mats of tules. The homes were up to 55 feet (17 m) across and three or four families lived in a single dwelling. They built a fire pit in the middle and left a vent or chimney in the center of the roof.

In mountainous regions where redwood trees grew, they may have built conical houses from redwood bark attached to a frame of wood. One of the main village buildings, the sweat lodge, was built low into the ground, its walls made of earth and roof of earth and brush. They built boats of tule to navigate on the bays propelled by double-bladed paddles.

=== Spiritual beliefs ===
The Esselen left hand prints on rock faces in a few locations. About 250 have been found in a single rock shelter located a few miles from Tassajara (designated by archeologists as CA-MNT-44). Smaller numbers of handprints have been found in a few caves or rock shelters in the same area and in the next valley to the west.

=== Climate ===
Rainfall varies from 16 to 60 inches (410 to 1,520 mm) throughout the range, with the most falling on the higher mountains in the north; almost all precipitation falls in the winter. During the summer, fog and low clouds are frequent along the coast up to an elevation of several thousand feet. Surface runoff from rainfall events is rapid, and many streams dry up entirely in the summer, except for some perennial streams in the wetter areas in the north.

== European contact ==
Viscaino, likely the first European to land on the Central Coast of California, wrote about his visit to Monterey Bay from December 16, 1602, to January 3, 1603.

"The Indians are of good stature and fair complexion the women being somewhat less in size than the men and of pleasing countenance. The clothing of the people of the coast lands consist of the skins of the sea-wolves [sea otters] abounding there, which they tan and dress better than is done in Castile; they possess also, in great quantity, flax like that of Castile, hemp and cotton, from which they make fishing-lines and nets for rabbits and hares. They have vessels of pine wood very well made, in which they go to sea with fourteen paddle men on a side, with great dexterity, even in stormy weather."

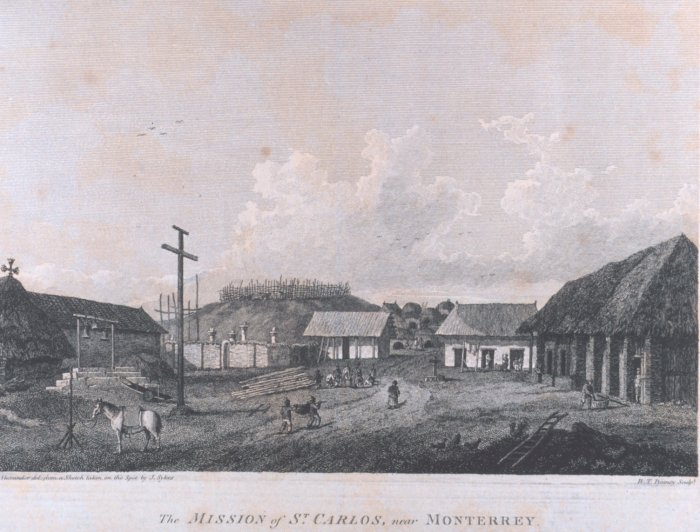
A drawing of Mission San Carlos Borromeo de Carmelo prepared by Captain George Vancouver depicts the grounds as they appeared in November 1792. Round, native huts of thatched branches are shown in the background. From A Voyage of Discovery to the North Pacific Ocean and Round the World.

Father Junipero Serra first established the original mission in Monterey on June 3, 1770, near the native village of Tamo. It was also adjacent to the Presidio and headquarters of Pedro Fages, who served as military governor of Alta California between 1770 and 1774.

Fages worked his men very harshly and complaints mounted until Serra intervened. He told Fages that, as a Christian, he had to observe the sabbath and let his men rest on Sundays. But the soldiers raped the Indian woman and took them as concubines. At Serra's urging, Fages punished some of the more excessive incidents of sexual abuse, but it did not stop.

Fages regarded the natives with disrespect. In 1787, he described the area's Indians as the laziest, most brutish and least rational of all the natives discovered between San Diego and San Francisco. He reckoned those qualities — along with the foggy and windy climate, shortage of potable water, high death rate, and language barriers — accounted for the painfully slow progress of mission Carmel. Fages regarded the Spanish installations in California as military institutions first and religious outposts second. Fages and Serra were engaged in a heated power struggle and Serra decided to move the mission.

=== Spanish missions ===
In May 1771, the viceroy approved Serra's petition to relocate the mission to its current location near the Carmel River and present-day town of Carmel-by-the-Sea and named it Mission San Carlos Borromeo de Carmelo. Serra's goal in part was to put some distance between the mission's neophytes and from Fages and his troops.

The new mission was on land better suited to farming and within a short distance of the Rumsen Ohlone villages of Tucutnut and Achasta. The latter village may have been founded after Mission San Carlos was relocated to Carmel. The mission was about 10 miles (16 km) from the nearest Esselen territory, Excelen. On May 9, 1775, Junípero Serra baptized what appears to be the first Esselen, Pach-hepas, who was the 40-year-old chief of the Excelen. His baptism took place at Xasáuan, 10 leagues (about 26 miles (42 km)) southeast of the mission, in an area now named Cachagua, a close approximation of the Esselen name.

=== Baptisms and forced labor ===
King Charles V of Spain issued the New Laws (in Spanish, Leyes Nuevas, or "New Laws of the Indies for the Good Treatment and Preservation of the Indians") on November 20, 1542. These were replaced around the beginning of the 17th century with Repartimiento, which entitled a Spanish settler or official to the labor of a number of indigenous workers on their farms or mines. The Spanish state based its right over the land and persons of the Indies on the Papal charge to evangelize the indigenous population. This motivated the Jesuits to build missions across California.

Under Spanish law, the Esselen were technically free individuals, but they could be compelled by force to labor without pay. With the help of the soldiers who guarded the mission, the Esselen and Ohlone Indians who lived near the mission were forcibly relocated, conscripted, and trained as plowmen, shepherds, cattle herders, blacksmiths, and carpenters on the mission. Disease, starvation, over work, and torture decimated the tribe.

The Esselen had ongoing conflicts with the neighboring Rumsen tribe over crops and hunting grounds. The Rumsen initially assisted the Franciscans and when they fell on hard times, taught the missionaries what they could harvest from the wild for food. When a tribal member entered Mission San Carlos to be baptized, the priests tried to communicate to them that they could not leave the mission and wander the forests and fields on their own as they had done before. They became in effect vassals of the mission. They were given a new Christian name at their baptism as well. If an Indian left the mission and attempted to return to his or her village, Spanish law required the soldiers to track them down and bring them back to the Mission. When they were brought back, they were beaten and confined.

The priests baptized a number of Esselen during 1776, most of them children, and a few more in the following years. The priests allowed the children after baptism to continue to live with their parents in their village until they reached the "age of reason," which was about nine years old. In 1783, the soldiers fought the Excelen and killed a few of them. The battle may have resulted from the soldiers' attempts to collect the children and force them to live at the mission. Baptisms picked up again after this date, perhaps because the Excelen saw they could not defeat the soldiers and decided they wanted to be with their children. Upon baptism the Esselen were considered to be part of a monastic order and subject to the rules of that order. This placed them, by Spanish law, under the direct authority of the padres.

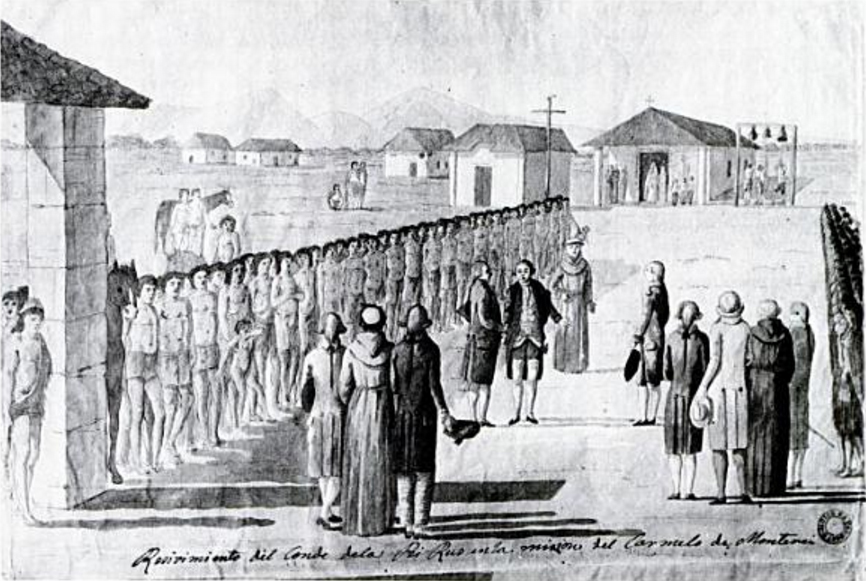
Indians of Mission San Carlos Borromeo are lined up with military precision to greet French expedition led by Jean Francois Galaup, Comte De La Perouse. Watercolor attributed to Tomas de Suria or Jose Cardero, 1791, after a lost original painting at the occasion by Gaspard Duché de Vancy, 1786.

The families lived in small rooms in generally unsanitary conditions. Over half the children born at a California mission died before age 4 and only about two of every ten lived to be teenagers. The girls were separated from their families at age 8 and required to sleep in a segregated, locked dormitory called the monjero (nunnery). Once they rose, they worked inside until they finished their chores around lunch time, they were allowed some time to visit their family's homes in the mission village. Married women whose husbands were absent and widows were also required to sleep there. The boys and unmarried men also had their own dormitory, though it was less confining.

French explorer Jean La Pérouse visited Monterey with two ships on September 14, 1786. Two days after he arrived, he visited Mission San Carlos Borromeo. In honor of his reception, the Indian neophytes were given an extra ration of food and lined up to see him. La Pérouse's described the natives as lifeless, robbed of spirit, traumatized, and depressed. Among other things, he described severe punishments inflicted on the Indians by the friars. He thought they considered the Indians "too much a child, too much a slave, too little a man." Until western contact, the native people lived in small villages of between 30 and 100 people. In 1786, there were 740 native men, women and children living in the village next to the Mission. The priests were ignorant of the cultural differences between the tribes and forced the Rumsen and Esselen Indians to live together. The two tribes were very hostile to one another and their proximity brought ongoing strife. Galaup described them as ill-fed and depressed by the strict mission routines. He said they were treated like slaves on a plantation.

From 1783 to 1785, about 40% of the Excelen were baptized. Another three Esselen were baptized at the Mission Soledad in the early 1790s, but by 1798 the majority of the Indians had been baptized. A new priest, Father Amoró, arrived in September 1804 and injected fresh energy into baptism efforts. From 1804 to 1808, 25 individuals from Excelen were baptized during these final four years. They comprised nearly 10% of the total Excelen population who were baptized. They had held out for 33 years after proselytizing began in their area. The last five baptized were all older, from 45 to 80 years. The total number of Esselen baptized is estimated to range from 790 to 856.

It may be that the older Esselen were baptized last because they were left alone and unable to support themselves after their children and grandchildren had already been coerced into living at the mission. There is some evidence that a few Esselen hid in the rugged, higher reaches of the mountains where the Spanish soldiers could not find them.

In 1795, the Spanish crown dictated that all religious instruction should be conducted in Spanish and that the native languages should be suppressed. This edict overturned the New Laws of 1542 which directed the missionaries to teach the natives in their own tongue. But the priests were still required to adhere to the third provincial council of Lima in 1583, which stated that the priests must give sermons and receive confession in the native people's own tongue.

== Population ==
The Esselen were and are one of the least numerous indigenous people in California. The Spanish mission system led to severe decimation of the initially small Esselen population. Estimates for the pre-contact populations of most native groups in California, including the Esselen, vary substantially. Alfred L. Kroeber suggested that the 1770 population for the Esselen of 500. Sherburne F. Cook raised this estimate to 750. Based on baptism records and population density, Breschini calculated that they numbered 1,185-1,285.

The Esselen are too often regarded as the first California Native American tribe to become culturally extinct, much to the frustration of current generations of Esselen people. By about 1822, much of the California Indian population in proximity to the missions had been forced into the Spanish mission system. Due to the proximity of the Esselen people to three of the Spanish missions, Mission San Carlos in Carmel, Mission Nuestra Señora de la Soledad in Soledad, and Mission San Antonio de Padua in Jolon, the tribe was heavily impacted by their presence. The native population was decimated by disease, including measles, smallpox, and syphilis, which wiped out 90 percent of the native population, and by conscript labor, poor food, and forced assimilation. Most of the Esselen people's villages within the current Los Padres National Forest were left largely uninhabited. Professor Sherburne Cook, an expert in Native American populations, described the causes of the population decline:

The first (factor) was the food supply ... The second factor was disease ... A third factor, which strongly intensified the effect of the other two, was the social and physical disruption visited upon the Indian. He was driven from his home by the thousands, starved, beaten, raped, and murdered with impunity. He was not only given no assistance in the struggle against foreign diseases, but was prevented from adopting even the most elementary measures to secure his food, clothing, and shelter. The utter devastation caused by the white man was literally incredible, and not until the population figures are examined does the extent of the havoc become evident.

Some anthropologists and linguists assumed that the Esselen people's culture had been virtually extinguished by as early as the 1840s. However, existing tribe members cite evidence that some Esselen were able to move beyond the reach of the Spanish soldiers, who rode on horseback, by hiding in the rugged interior of the Santa Lucia Mountains. In the 1840s, some Esselen are believed to have migrated to the ranchos and rural areas outside the growing towns. Archaeologists located the grave of a girl estimated to be about six years old buried in Isabel Meadows Cave in the Church Creek area. They calculated the date of her burial to be about 1825. Two experts received reports of Indians living in the area through the 1850s. Today, contemporary generations of Esselen trace their ancestry to Esselen who were counted in early U.S. census efforts.

In 1909, forest supervisors reported that three Indian families still lived within what was then known as the Monterey National Forest. The Encinale family of 16 members and the Quintana family with three members lived in the vicinity of The Indians (now known as Santa Lucia Memorial Park west of Ft. Hunger Liggett). The Mora family consisting of three members was living to the south along the Nacimiento-Ferguson Road.

== Federal recognition ==
About 460 individuals have identified themselves as descendants of the original Esselen people and banded together to form a tribe. The Department of the Interior has set aside 45 acres (18 ha) of Fort Ord that the tribe can use to build a cultural center and museum. But they must first obtain federal recognition. They have been assisted by Alan Leventhal, a lecturer and volunteer at San Jose State University, and Dr. Les Field of the University of New Mexico, who have helped establish the tribe's cultural identity.

The tribe was briefly formally identified in 1883 as a tribe by Indian Affairs agent Helen Hunt Jackson. It was also identified on official Indian census rolls, maps, and in a land-rights petition sent to President Theodore Roosevelt. But in 1899, anthropologist Alfred Kroeber declared that the tribe was extinct because most tribal members had intermarried, taken Spanish names, and converted to Catholicism. Kroeber wrote in 1925:

Still farther north, from Monterey to San Francisco, and inland to Mount Diablo, were numerous squalid and interrelated bands, many of whose local village names have been preserved, but for whom there is no generic name beyond the Spanish 'coast-men,' Costaños, corrupted into Costanoan in technical book English. A century and a third of contact with the superior race has proved fatal to this group also, and it is as good as gone.

In 1955, Kroeber decided he had made a mistake and tried to persuade the BIA, but the agency refused to listen to his arguments or accept his evidence.

In 1927, the superintendent of the Sacramento agency of the Bureau of Indian Affairs listed California tribes that should be given land rights, but he excluded the Esselen along over 135 other tribes from the list. A tribal member and researcher has identified more than 100 individual Esselen who were living in Monterey County in 1923 while the group was still federally recognized. The tribe says their exclusion as a recognized tribe was a mistake that should be rectified.

Many anthropologists believed that the Costanoan-speaking people encompassed a geographical area from north of San Francisco to Monterey. The name Costanoan is derived from a generic name Costaños ('coast-men) applied by the Spanish to all native people on the coast. It was later corrupted as Costanoan in the English language. As a result of the 1928 California Indian Jurisdictional Act enrollment, almost every Bureau of Indian Affairs "enrollee" of Esselen descent was categorized as Costanoan by the agency.

In 2010 the Esselen Nation petitioned the federal government for recognition as a tribe. The Bureau of Indian Affairs says the tribe does not meet the formal criteria used to recognize a tribe.

== Tribal land ==
In the 20th century, Axel Adler built a cabin on the former Bixby Ranch and gradually acquired more land. In 2013, descendants of the Adler family who lived in Sweden put 1,312 acres (531 ha) of the Adler Ranch on the market for $15 million. It is located at the end and south of Palo Colorado Road. The ranch is located along the Little Sur River at the northwestern edge of the Ventana Wilderness adjacent to the Monterey Peninsula Regional Park District's Mill Creek Redwood Preserve and the Los Padres National Forest, and includes the peak of Bixby Mountain and the upper portions of Mescal Ridge. The El Sur Ranch and Pico Blanco Mountain are to the south. The tract contains old-growth redwoods, grasslands, oak woodlands, chaparral, and madrone forest. The ranch is an important habitat for California spotted owls, California condors, California red-legged frogs, marbled murrelets, and bald and golden eagles. The property is especially valuable because it includes nine legal parcels, five of which could be developed. The Big Sur Land Trust stated it was not interested in acquiring the property.

The nonprofit Western Rivers Conservancy, which buys land with the goal to protect habitat and provide public access, secured a purchase agreement. It was initially interested in selling the land to the US Forest Service, which would make it possible for hikers to travel from Bottchers Gap to the sea. But some local residents were opposed to the forest service acquiring the land. They are concerned about a lack of federal funding to maintain a critical fire break on the land.

On October 2, 2019, the California Natural Resources Agency announced it was seeking funding through Proposition 68, a bond measure approved by voters in 2018, to obtain the land for the tribe. The Adler family agreed to sell 1,199 acres (485 ha) of the Adler Ranch. The land was purchased through a $4.52 million grant from the California Natural Resources Agency. In late July 2020 the purchase of the Adler Ranch successfully closed and the property was transferred to the Esselen tribe. The land acquisition could help facilitate federal recognition of the tribe.

"It is beyond words for us, the highest honor," said Tom Little Bear Nason, chairman of the Esselen Tribe of Monterey County. "The land is the most important thing to us. It is our homeland, the creation story of our lives. We are so elated and grateful." The Esselen tribe has 214 members and intends to share it with other Central Coast tribes such as the Ohlone, the Amah Mutsun, and the Rumsen people who also were decimated during the Mission Era

== In popular culture ==
The Esalen Institute in Big Sur is named after this tribe as was the former Boy Scouts of America Monterey Bay Area Council Order of the Arrow Esselen Lodge #531.

== See also ==
- Kuksu (religion)
