= Old Coast Road (Big Sur) =

Pre-1920 dirt road in Monterey County, California

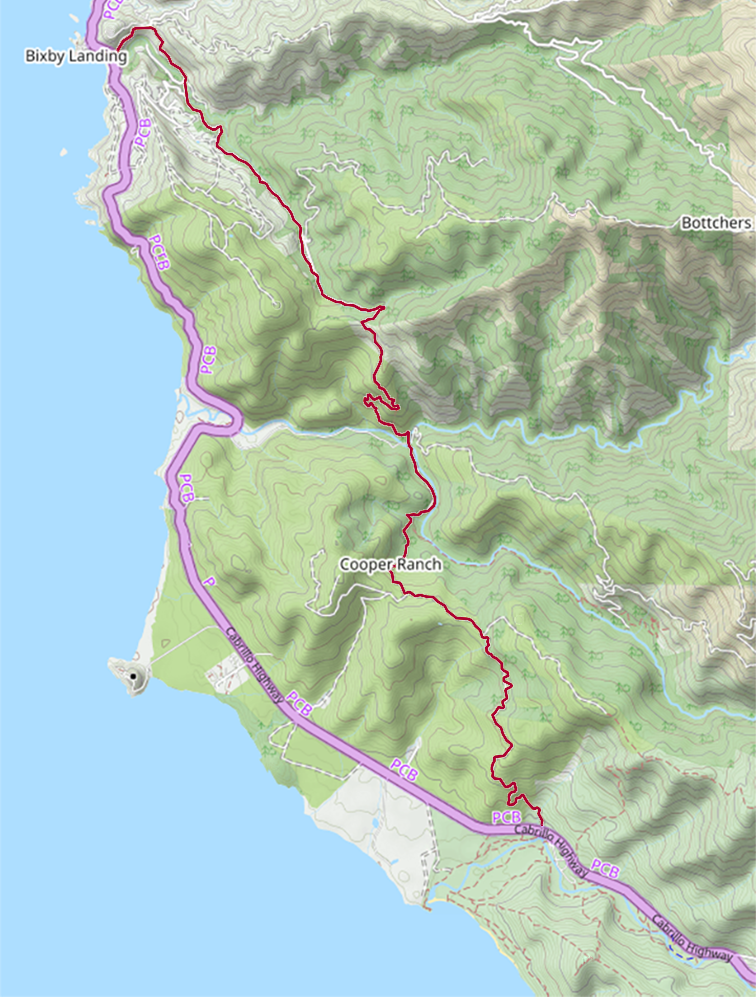
The remaining 10.2 miles (16.4 km) portion of the original Old Coast Road. It connects on the north to Highway 1 at Bixby Creek Bridge and on the south near Andrew Molera State Park.

The Old Coast Road is a dirt road that still exists in part and preceded the current Big Sur Coast Highway along the northern coast of Big Sur, California. It was initially a trail created by Rumsen and Esselen Native Americans to travel along the coast in present-day Monterey County, California. Soon after the Spanish arrived, Governor Teodoro Gonzalez granted land that included portions of the trail as Rancho San Jose y Sur Chiquito to Marcelino Escobar in 1835. Governor Juan Alvarado re-granted the land to Escobar the same year. The Rancho included land from Carmel to near Palo Colorado Canyon. José Castro gained possession of the land in about 1848. He improved the trail from Monterey to Palo Colorado Canyon as early as 1853. A hand-drawn map created c. 1853 accompanying the grant indicated a road or trail was already present along the coast.

Monterey County first declared it a public road in 1855. In 1886, Charles Bixby improved the road between his ranch and Monterey, and William Post extended it further south to his ranch. The condition of the road limited the shipment of goods. Steamers used a dozen dog-hole ports along the Big Sur coast like those at Notley's Landing, Cape San Martin Landing, and the mouth of the Big Sur River to pick up lime, tanbark, and other materials, and to transport heavy goods and supplies to residents. In 1920, the 26 mi (42 km) trip from Carmel in a light spring wagon pulled by two horses could be completed in about 11 hours. A lumber wagon pulled by four horses could make the trip in 13 hours. The road was impassable for most of each winter. Dr. John L. Roberts first proposed converting the wagon road into a highway in 1915. Opening the coast to visitors for recreational use in the early 1900s increased interest in improving access to the region. Construction of a paved highway was begun in 1921. Funding ran out and construction was restarted in 1928. Road construction necessitated construction of 29 bridges, the most difficult of which was the 714 feet (218 m) long and 260 feet (79 m) high bridge over Bixby Creek, about 13 miles (21 km) south of Carmel. The paved highway was opened in 1937.

A 10.2 miles (16.4 km) portion of the original Old Coast Road still exists. It is accessible to high-clearance vehicles from Highway 1 immediately north of the Bixby Creek Bridge. The road enters the El Sur Ranch for 6.5 miles (10.5 km) and descends sharply into the Little Sur River canyon. It crosses the river twice at the junction of its North and South forks, formerly the location of the Idlewild Resort from about 1900 to 1921. After another 2.8 miles (4.5 km), the road enters a coastal redwood forest. There is a pullout after about 3.2 miles (5.1 km). After another .6 miles (0.97 km), the road leaves the El Sur Ranch and climbs out of the canyon before descending steeply, rounding a number of blind curves and descending towards Andrew Molera State Park where it rejoins Highway 1.

== Origins ==
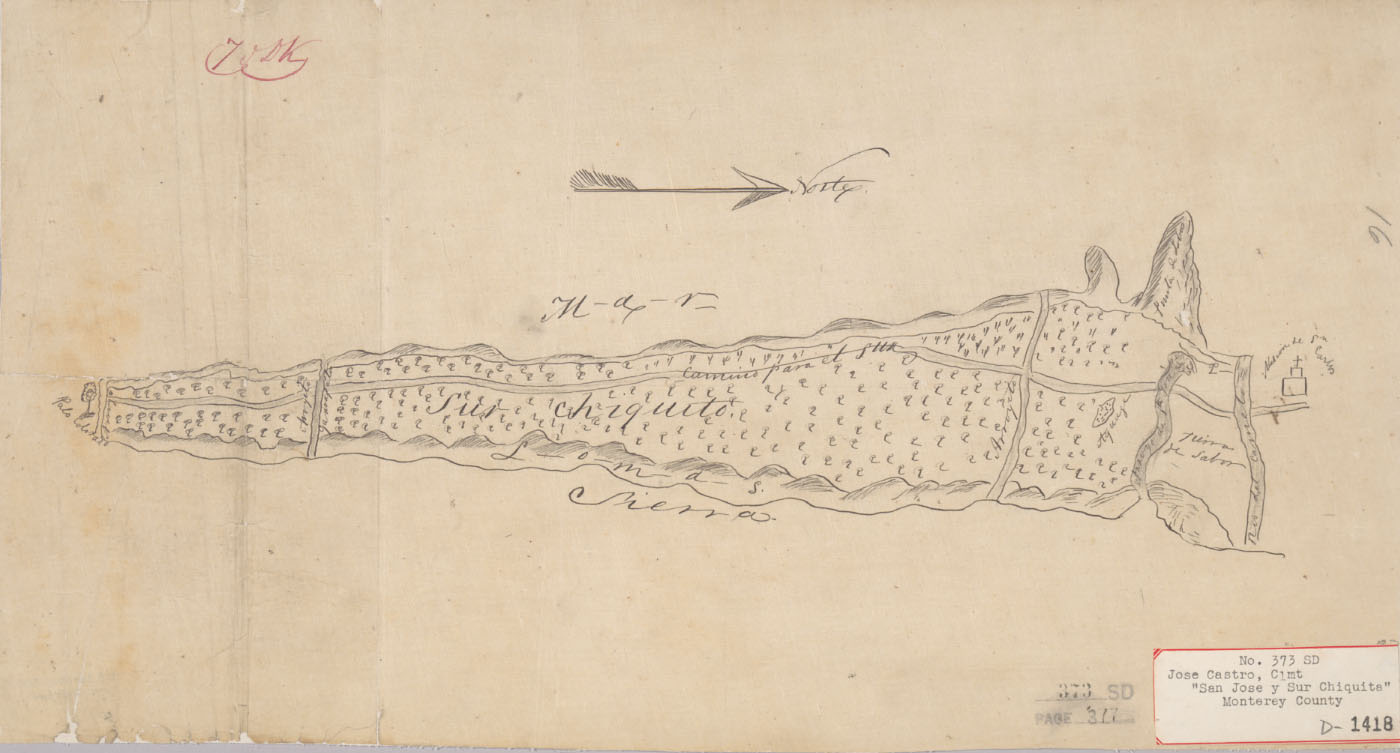
Original 1853 hand-drawn Diseño (map) of Rancho San José y Sur Chiquito. The road "camino para el sur" (English: road to the south) is shown along the coast at the top of the image.

A trail along the coast was created by Rumsen and Esselen Native Americans who traveled along the coast in present-day Monterey County, California before the 1700s. On 14 September 1786, the two ships of explorer Jean La Pérouse expedition visited Mission San Carlos Borromeo de Carmelo. By this time, almost the entire indigenous population had been forced into laboring within the California mission system. He reported that, "The country of the Ecclemachs [Esselen] extends above 20 leagues to the eastward of Monterey."

=== Rancho San Jose y Sur Chiquito ===
Governor Juan Alvarado granted Rancho San José y Sur Chiquito comprising two square leagues of land in 1839 to Marcelino Escobar, Alcalde (or mayor) of Monterey. It included land from south of the Carmel River to the north side of Palo Colorado Canyon. It was named for two bodies of water: San José Creek near Point Lobos and El Río Chiquito del Sur.

Two of Escobar's sons, Juan and Agustin, obtained possession of the rancho shortly afterward, and sold it on August 26, 1841, to Doňa Maria Josefa de Abrego for about three cents an acre. She held power of attorney for her husband to buy and sell land. She paid $250, one-half in silver, and one-half in gold. She may have been acting for her husband, José Abrego. She later deeded the land to a group of about 10 Mexican soldiers at no cost, perhaps in payment of a gambling debt incurred by her husband. The soldiers in turn gave it to José Castro, their superior officer, in about 1848. Castro was former Governor Alvarado's brother-in-law. Castro improved on the existing primitive trail from Monterey to Palo Colorado Canyon as early as 1853, when he filed a map documenting the boundaries.

=== Rancho El Sur ===
Maria Jerónima de la Encarnación Vallejo, the sister of Governor Mariano Guadalupe Vallejo, married Captain John B. R. Cooper in 1827. In 1834, Mexican Governor José Figueroa granted Rancho El Sur comprising two square leagues of land (8,949.06-acre (36.22 km^{2})) to Juan Bautista Alvarado. Six years later, Alvarado traded ownership of Rancho El Sur with Cooper for the more accessible and readily farmed 22,000-acre (89.03 km^{2}) Rancho Bolsa del Potrero y Moro Cojo south of present-day Castroville in the Salinas Valley. Rancho El Sur was partitioned into fifteen lots by 1892. Lots one through thirteen comprise the present-day El Sur Ranch. Lots 14 and 15 were owned by Frances and Andrew Molera, grandchildren of John B.R. Cooper. She later sold the land to The Nature Conservancy which in turn sold it to the state of California. It formed Andrew Molera State Park.

The first road through the rancho was extended from the trail through Rancho San Jose y Sur Chiquito by local residents. They routed the road inland about 11 miles (18 km) to bypass the steep canyon at the mouth of Mill Creek (present-day Bixby Creek). It then crossed the North and South Forks of the Little Sur River and then continued south to the Molera Ranch. Three years later the ranch owners extended it to Posts Summit.

After California gained statehood in 1850, the county declared the trail from Carmel to Mill Creek (present-day Bixby Creek) as a public road in 1855. But the California coast south of Carmel and north of San Simeon remained one of the most remote regions in the state, rivaling at the time nearly any other region in the United States for its difficult access. It remained largely an untouched wilderness until early in the twentieth century. When the region was first settled by European immigrants in 1853, it was the United States' "last frontier."

== Bixby builds road ==
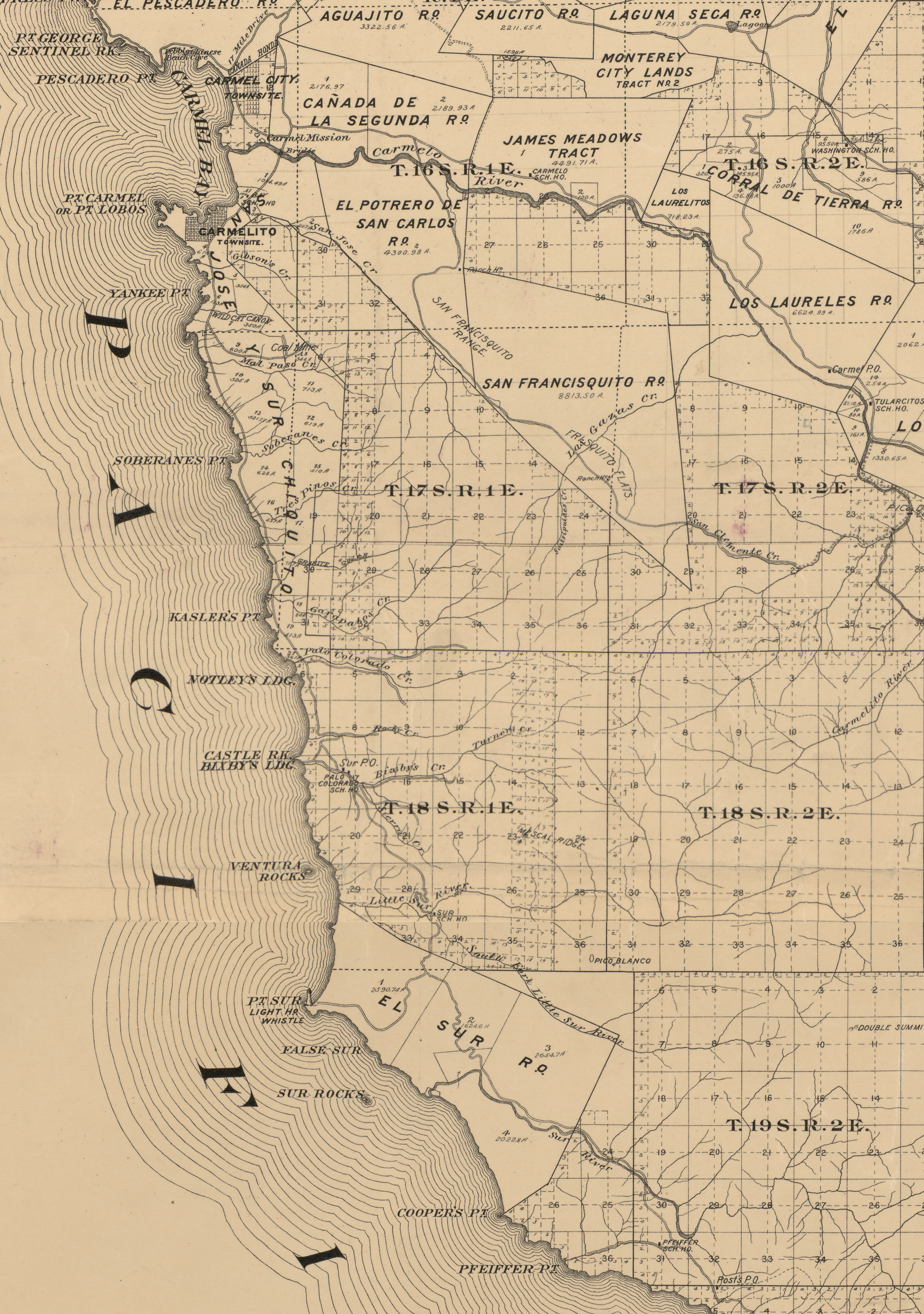
1898 Map detail illustrating road along California central coast

When J.B.R. Cooper died, his wife and children inherited the land. The Cooper Ranch and the Molera Ranch were operated on the northern and southern portions of the Rancho. They used the road to transport cattle and products to and from Monterey. Yankee businessman Charles Henry Bixby obtained a patent on April 10, 1889, for 160 acres (65 ha) south of Bixby Creek. He harvested lumber, tanbark, and mined lime. Without a road, he resorted to using a tram, landing chute, and hoist to transfer the goods to ships anchored slightly offshore. Bixby tried to persuade the county to build a road to Bixby Creek, but they refused, replying that "no one would want to live there." In 1870, Bixby and his father hired men to improve the track and constructed the first wagon road including 23 bridges from the Carmel Mission to Bixby Creek.

Further south, the Rancho El Sur grant extended from the mouth of Little Sur River inland about 2.5 miles (4.0 km) over the coastal mountains and south along the coast past the mouth of the Big Sur River to Cooper's Point. It was largely a cattle operation. There was a brief industrial boom in southern Monterey County during the late 19th century, but the early decades of the twentieth century passed with few changes. Big Sur residents grew produce locally and raised cattle for markets in Monterey and the Salinas Valley. Most of the coast remained a nearly inaccessible wilderness. As late as the 1920s, only two homes in the entire region had electricity, locally generated by water wheels and windmills. Most of the population lived without power until connections to the California electric grid were established in the early 1950s. The region has always been relatively difficult to access and only the sturdiest and most self-sufficient settlers stayed.

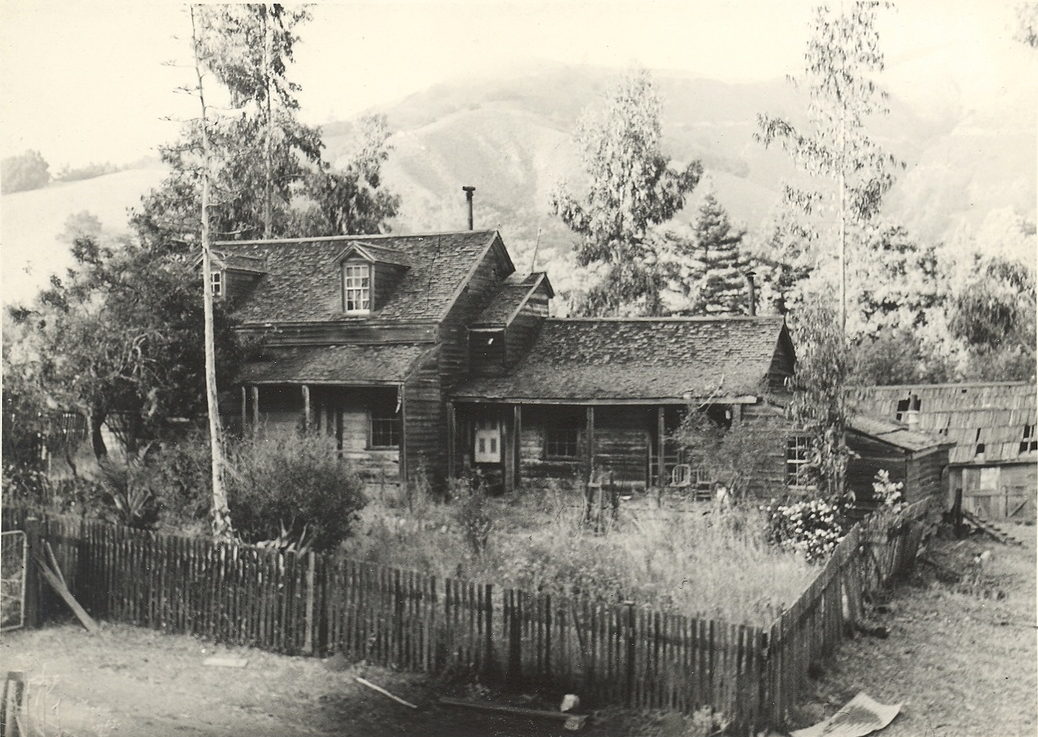
James W. Post enlarged his father's one-room cabin in Big Sur in 1877. As was the custom of the time, the family hosted visitors to the Big Sur coast, until 1910 when a discourteous guest caused his wife to begin charging visitors.

== Road improved ==
In 1886 Charles Bixby partnered with W. B. Post and they improved and realigned what became known as the Old Coast Road south to Post's ranch near Sycamore Canyon. At Bixby Creek, the road was necessarily built 11 miles (18 km) inland to circumvent the deep canyon. The road from Bixby climbed the steep Cerro Hill and crossed the Little Sur River where its two forks diverted before crossing the Cooper Ranch on the former Rancho El Sur. It continued south about 7 miles (11 km) to the Pfeiffer Resort. In 1920, the 26 mi (42 km) trip from Carmel in a light spring wagon pulled by two horses could be completed in about 11 hours. A lumber wagon pulled by four horses could make the trip in 13 hours.

In 1891, visitor C. A. Canfield wrote about how a trip on the mail wagon to Posts took most of a day, where he remained the night. The next day he rode horseback south with Thomas B. Slate. They reached Slates Hot Springs at about 5pm. Due to the steep and narrow road, even during the summer Coast residents would receive supplies via boat from Monterey or San Francisco. The single-lane road was closed in winter when it became impassable. Due to the limited access, settlement was primarily concentrated near the Big Sur River and present-day Lucia, and individual settlements along a 25 miles (40 km) stretch of coast between the two. The northern and southern regions of the coast were isolated from one another.

In 1897, Harold W. Fairbanks and Maynard Dixon traversed the coast over a two-week period. They wrote:

A Spanish grant is located about the mouth of the Sur river. The greed of the Spaniards leading them to this almost inaccessible spot is rather surprising. It is still almost in a state of nature, but roamed over by thousands of cattle. The ranch buildings consist of old sheds and tumble-down adobes peopled with geese, chickens, hogs, calves, and Mexicans of all ages and conditions.

In 1900, the county improved the road south to the forks of the Little Sur River. Charles Howland, who drove the mail stage between Monterey and Big Sur, built the Idlewild Hotel in about 1900 on the Old Coast Road where it crossed the Little Sur River. The Pfeiffer family's hospitality was enjoyed by friends and strangers alike for years. They finally began charging guests in 1910, naming it Pfeiffer's Ranch Resort, and it became one of the earliest places to stay.

== Recreation draws travelers ==
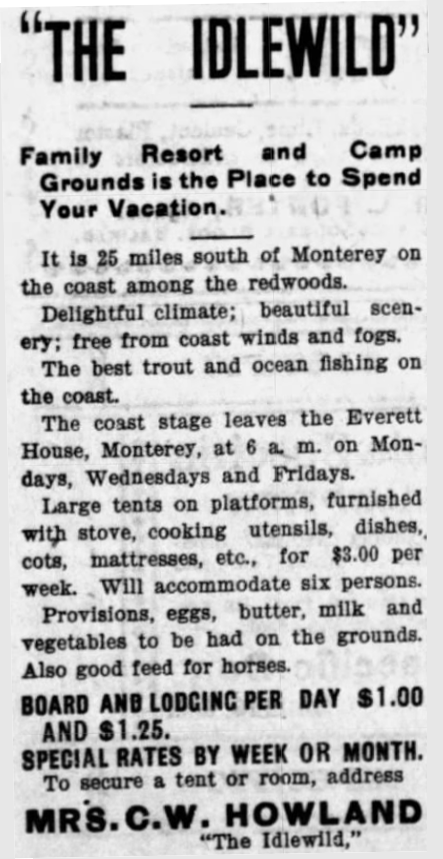
Advertisement for the Idlewild resort on the Little Sur River in 1902.

In 1904, residents extended the unpaved road from the Pfeiffer Resort in Sycamore Canyon to the Post Ranch, and then it was extended another 2.5 miles (4.0 km) south to Castro Canyon, near the present-day location of Deetjen's Big Sur Inn. In 1905, the Idlewild resort and campground on the Little Sur River advertised that visitors could take the 6 a.m. stage from the Everett House in Monterey on Mondays, Wednesdays, and Fridays. By 1909, their advertisements stated that the camp would be accessible by auto as soon as the "Cerro Grade", a stretch of road from the coast to the Little Sur River near Cerro Hill, was completed. In 1910, the Monterey Daily Cypress reported that Mr. and Mrs. A.E. [Abelardo Enos] Cooper "motored down to Mrs. Martha M. Cooper ranch at Sur, leaving Monterey at 12 midnight and arriving there at 2 a.m." J. Smeaton Chase, who traveled on horseback up the coast in 1911, reported that a stage coach carried passengers from Posts (then named Arbolado) to Monterey on alternate days. But the road was still very rough and most goods including cheese produced on the Cooper Ranch were shipped by boat to Monterey.

The Idlewild competed with the Pfeiffer Resort for guests through about 1920, when the Idlewild was forced out of business by Martha Cooper, who acquired the land. In 1920, the 26 mi (42 km) trip from Carmel in a light spring wagon pulled by two horses could be completed in about 11 hours. A lumber wagon pulled by four horses could make the trip in 13 hours.

== Current road ==
In July 1937, the California Highways and Public Works department described the journey prior to the construction of the newly opened road. "There was a narrow, winding, steep road from Carmel south ... approximately 35 miles to the Big Sur River. From that point south to San Simeon, it could only be traveled by horseback or on foot."

A paved 37 miles (60 km) section of the road two-lane highway from Carmel River in the north to Anderson Canyon south of McWay Falls was opened in December 1932. The remainder of the route to San Carpóforo Creek near San Simeon in the south was opened on June 17, 1937. It replaced the Old Coast Road, with the exception of a section inland of the current Bixby Creek Bridge. That bridge, 714 feet (218 m) long and 260 feet (79 m) above the creek bed, eliminated a long detour inland. That inland section of road still exists, allowing residents access to their homes and land.

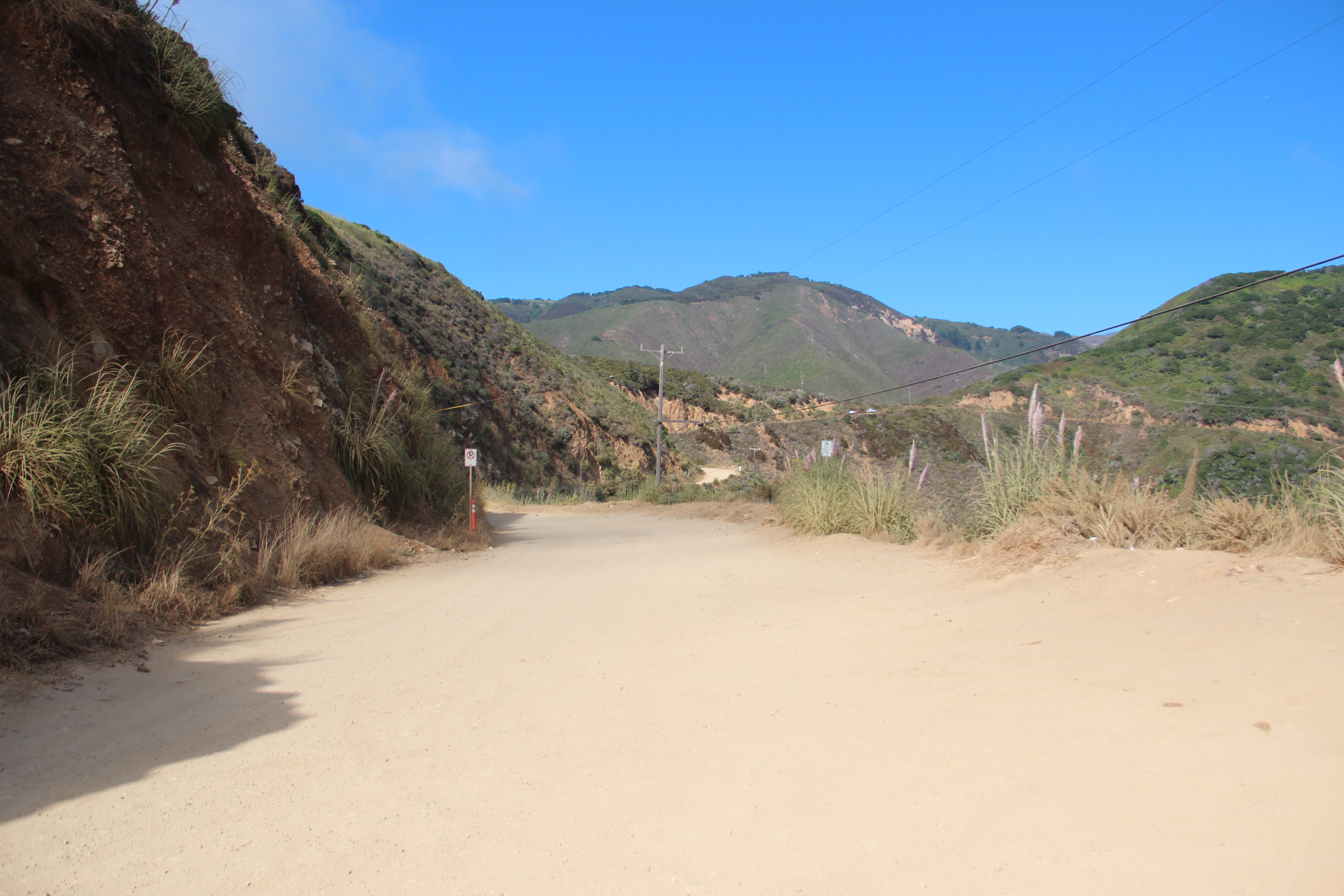
Old Coast Road at Bixby Creek Bridge

The remaining 10.2 miles (16.4 km) portion of the original Old Coast Road connects on the north end to Highway 1 immediately north of the Bixby Creek Bridge. Most of the land on either side of the county road is privately owned. Trespassing, hunting, camping, or fires are not permitted at any time. From Bixby Creek Bridge, the route descends about 400 feet (120 m) into Bixby Canyon. After crossing Bixby Creek, it parallels Serra Creek on the left until it reaches a ridge line at 1,200 feet (370 m) in the rugged Santa Lucia Range. The road crosses the El Sur Ranch for 6.5 miles (10.5 km), which along with Highway 1, creates two easements across the ranch. The ranch strictly enforces the no trespassing signs. Individuals who trespass on the ranch's land have been cited.

After entering the El Sur Ranch, the road descends sharply into the Little Sur River canyon. It crosses the river twice at the junction of its North and South forks, formerly the location of the Idlewild Resort from about 1900 to 1921. After another 2.8 miles (4.5 km), the road enters a coastal redwood forest. There is a pullout after about 3.2 miles (5.1 km). After another .6 miles (0.97 km), the road leaves the El Sur Ranch and climbs out of the canyon before descending steeply, rounding a number of blind curves and descending towards Andrew Molera State Park where it rejoins Highway 1.

The dirt road may be impassable and closed during wet weather. When passable, the drive takes about one hour. There are several severe switchbacks, blind curves, and few pullouts or places to turn around. A high-clearance all wheel or four-wheel drive vehicle is recommended.

== Trails ==
The trailhead to Pico Blanco Camp on the southern shoulder of Pico Blanco is 3.8 miles (6.1 km) from the road's southern end at Highway 1. There is no parking available at the trailhead. As of May 2022, the trailhead is closed due to the closure of the Palo Colorado Canyon Road. The camp site at 1,300 feet (400 m) altitude is 5.7 miles (9.2 km) from the trailhead.

== Faults ==
Earthquake faults can be difficult to identify in Big Sur because of overlying rock formations, landslide deposits, and vegetation. A large fault crosses Highway 1 at Hurricane Point. The same fault revealed by crushed limestone fragments also traverses the Old Coast Road just 1.5 miles (2.4 km) northeast of the entrance to Andrew Molera State Park.

== Southern Coast Ridge Road ==
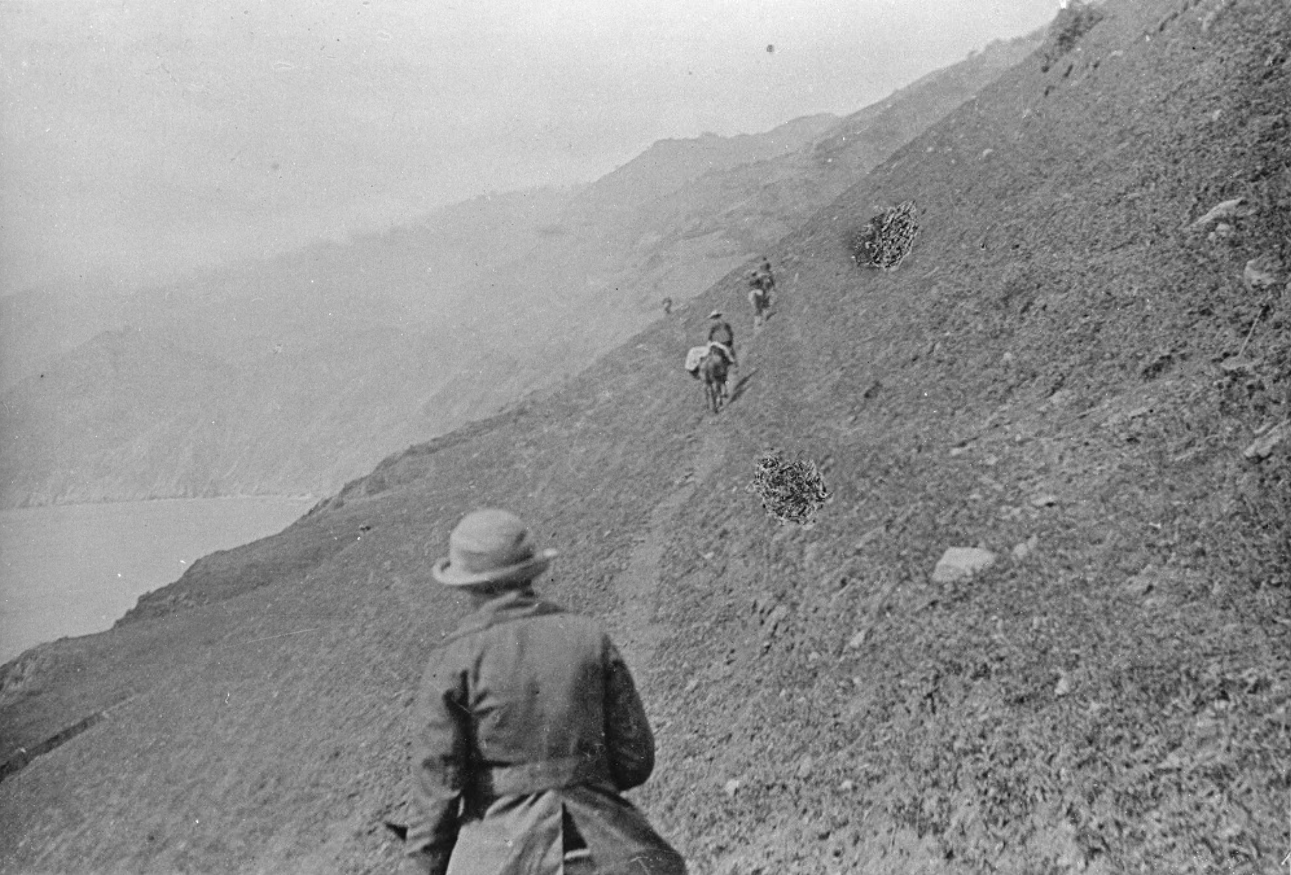
Monterey County Librarian Anne Hadden, her husband, and Ellen Frink on the trail between Lucia and Gorda in 1922. They delivered books on horseback to the south coast of Big Sur.

=== History ===
Prior to the construction of Highway 1, the southern region of Monterey County coast was isolated from the few settlements in the north by the steep and rugged terrain. To the south of Posts, there was no road beyond the Pfeiffer Resort and Ranch, only a foot and horseback trail. During the 18th century, the Slates Trail began at the Old Post Ranch and climbed inland to the crest of the coastal ridge. To avoid the steep canyons along the coast, the trail followed the coastal ridge over Anderson Peak and Cone Peak to Slates Hot Springs. A network of coastal trails connected to locations in the south, including the Harlan and Dani families at Lucia, the families in Pacific Valley near what is now known as Plaskett and Gorda, and the mining town of Manchester.

The southern homesteaders were more closely tied to the people in the interior San Antonio Valley, including Jolon and Lockwood, than to the coastal communities in the vicinity of the Big Sur River, who were connected with Monterey to the north. A horse trail connected several trails originating on the coast of the southern region of Big Sur over the Santa Lucia Range through present-day Fort Hunter Liggett to Jolon in the San Antonio Valley. The ride from Posts in the north to San Carpóforo Canyon at the southern end of Big Sur was about 60 miles (97 km) in a direct line, but about three times that by horseback. The trail was gradually extended south and improved, but never to the extent of the northern portion.

=== Current use ===
Segments of the trail, now known as the Coast Ridge Road (Forest Service route 20S05), have been given new names. The road from the Ventana Inn to Cone Peak is known as North Coast Ridge Road. From the vicinity of Cone Peak to Nacimiento-Fergusson Road, it is named Cone Peak Road. To the south of the Nacimento-Fergusson Road, the route is named the South Coast Road. It terminates 64 miles (103 km) to the south at Salmon Creek.

Twenty-six private property owners granted the US Forest Service and specified permitted contactors a right-of-way and easement for vehicular access. The one-lane dirt road is only suitable for high-clearance four-wheel drive vehicles. They also granted the public an easement for the road from Posts to Cone Peak on foot or horseback.

The road is often impassable during and after winter storms. The US Forest Service has closed the Nacimento-Fergusson Road repeatedly due to fires and extensive slides, debris flows, and road failures.
