= Wagon Caves =

Wagon Cave Research Natural Area
- Location within California Location within the United States
- Location: Santa Lucia Mountains, Monterey County, USA
- Nearest city: Jolon, California
- Coordinates: 36°05′02″N 121°24′03″W
- Area: 806 acres (326 ha)
- Established: 2000
- Governing body: United States Forest Service

The 56 acres (23 ha) Wagon Caves rock formation is an archeological site that was used by the Salinan Antonianos subtribe who occupied at least two villages in the area more than a thousand years apart. The caves are located about 18 miles (29 km) northwest of Jolon, California.

In the latter part of the 1800s, the location became a way station for homesteaders and miners who traveled between the southern portion of the Big Sur coast and the interior. Wagons were left at the location, allowing travelers to transport goods to and from Jolon and later Soledad when the Union Pacific Railroad established a terminus there.

In 2000, the 806 acres (326 ha) Wagon Cave Research Natural Area was established to study and protect the unique flora found in the area. The location is known for huge valley oaks that are up to 100 feet (30 m) tall with trunks 6–7 feet (1.8–2.1 m) across.

== Indigenous occupation ==
The rock formation about 18 miles (29 km) northwest of present-day Jolon, California was used by the Salinan Antonianos subtribe who researchers believe occupied at least two villages in the area, an older site dating to approximately 450 A.D. and a later, protohistoric site with dates ranging from about 1450 to 1650 A.D.

Archeologists have found a stemmed biface, lithic flakes, shell beads, and non-human bones, as well as shell, bone, flaked stone, fire-affected rock, charred seeds, and mortars at the cave site. The rock overhangs and caves have fire-scarred roofs that bear evidence of occupancy over hundreds of years.

Researchers have identified a village named Trh’ama at Wagon Cave, between Rattlesnake Creek and the North Fork of the San Antonio River. Maria Jesusa Encinales stated that it was “the big rock where they keep the wagons”. The site has been recorded as state site CA-Mnt-0307. The upstream and downstream area has a series of midden sites and bedrock mortars.

The Salinan people are believed to have lived south of Junipero Serra Peak, perhaps ranging from Slates Hot Springs on the coast to Soledad in the Salinas Valley and into northern San Luis Obispo County.

After the Spanish established Mission San Antonio de Padua in 1771, they baptized and forced the native population to labor at the mission. By 1780 the Franciscans had baptized 585 natives, and by 1790 that number increased to 1,076, the largest mission in California. Ten years later the priests recorded 1,118 baptisms. A total of 4,348 natives were baptized.

Forced to live in close quarters, the aboriginal population was exposed to diseases unknown to them, including smallpox and measles. The Native Americans had no immunity and their population and culture were devastated. The population of the native people at the mission decreased to 878 in 1820 and 681 in 1830. When the missions were secularized in 1834, the population was further reduced to under 150. The small community of Jolon was practically deserted, leaving Mission San Antonio de Padua the only mission that failed to grow into a town during the Spanish or Mexican periods.

When Governor Pío Pico declared all mission buildings in Alta California for sale in 1845, no one bid for Mission San Antonio. The few remaining native people assimilated with Spanish and Mexican ranchers in the nineteenth century.

In 1909, forest supervisors reported that three Indian families still lived within what was then known as the Monterey National Forest. The Encinale family of 16 members and the Quintana family with three members lived in the vicinity of The Indians (now known as Santa Lucia Memorial Park west of Fort Hunter Liggett), about 5 miles from the Wagon Caves. The Mora family consisting of three members was living to the south along the Nacimiento-Ferguson Road.

== Pioneer usage ==
William and Sarah (Barnes) Plaskett and their family settled in Pacific Valley in southern Big Sur in 1869. They built several homes and a saw mill. William and Sarah (Barnes) Plaskett claimed a homestead in the area now known as Gorda 3.9 miles (6.3 km) south of Plaskett in 1869 and established a saw mill. They built several homes and a saw mill.

The John Little State Natural Reserve straddling the mouth of Lime Creek preserves the original 1917 cabin of conservationist Elizabeth K. Livermore. Homesteader John Junge built a one-room redwood cabin in 1920.

Due to the difficult terrain and lack of access, settlement of the Big Sur region was primarily concentrated in the north near the Big Sur River and in the south near Lucia, California. The northern and southern regions of the Big Sur coast were isolated from one another, connected only by a horseback trail. Weather permitting, the northern residents used a rough dirt road to transport cattle and some products to and from Monterey, but counted on a steamship to deliver and ship goods once a year that could not be transported on a wagon.

The south coast residents had to rely on horseback travel to conduct their business with merchants in the interior San Antonio and Salinas Valleys. About two or three dozen individual homesteads dotted a 25 miles (40 km) stretch of coast between the northern and southern regions in the 1890s. Before the completion of the Big Sur Coast Highway in 1937, the California coast south of Posts and north of San Simeon remained one of the most remote regions in the state, rivaling at the time nearly any other region in the United States for its difficult access. The extremely rough coast limited goods that could be transported by ship. The mines at Manchester received stamping mills and other machinery from a dog-hole port at Cape San Martin Landing. The machinery was then dragged on sleds up the steep canyons to the Los Burros Mining District.

There were two trails from the coast to Wagon Caves: the Plaskett/Mansfield Trail to the north near Lopez Point, known today as Lucia, and the Los Burros Trail to the south, connecting Manchester and the mines in that area.

Most of the families in the region were located around Lopez Point, including the Harlans, Danis, Gamboas, and Lopezes. They used the Plaskett/Mansfield Trail to herd cattle, pigs, goats, and even turkeys to market several times a year. The trail climbed 4,621 feet (1,408 m) over the steep Santa Lucia Mountain Range to near Cone Peak and then followed what is today known as the Carrizo Trail. From Cone Peak the trail ran easterly along a ridge until it finally descended to Wagon Cave on the north fork of the San Antonio River.

Over the Los Burros Trail, it was a 2 miles (3.2 km) hike or ride up steep canyon slopes from Manchester and Los Burros Mine District to the summit of the Santa Lucia Mountains, followed by a 10 miles (16 km) trip downhill trek to Wagon Cave.

At Wagon Cave, travelers rested and camped overnight before switching from horseback to and from the coast. Wagons were stored under a large overhang, hence Wagon Cave, for the purpose of hauling items to market and provisions back from Jolon and Soledad.

A wagon road connected the Caves with Jolon 18 miles (29 km) to the southeast in the San Antonio Valley. Jolon was a major stagecoach stop on the original El Camino Real, which in the late 1800s remained the primary route between San Francisco and San Diego.

In 1878, Jolon had two grocers, a butcher, a blacksmith, a harness maker, a general merchandise store, post office, and Wells Fargo station. When the Southern Pacific Railroad was extended in 1886 to Soledad, travelers could then ride horseback, their wagons, or a stage 37 miles (60 km) north. The families brought back supplies necessary to sustain their remote lives.

== Natural Research Area ==
In 2000, the 806 acres (326 ha) Wagon Cave Research Natural Area was established within the Los Padres National Forest. It contains diverse stands of valley oaks of varying ages and densities

The natural area was established to preserve the valley oak savanna's diverse range of native grasses and forbs. This caves area displays a wide diversity of both annual and perennial grasses. Spring wild flowers are abundant.

=== Flora ===
The grasslands around the caves contain many types of annual and perennial grasses. The most abundant native perennial grasses are deergrass (Muhlenbergia rigens) and three types of needlegrass (Nassella spp.). These were once abundant and widespread bunchgrasses in California. The indigenous people used the up to 4 feet (1.2 m) long thin deergrass flower stalks to make coiled baskets. The Salinan tribe collect grass to make baskets.

The extensive displays of spring wild flowers include abundant clarkias, clovers, goldfields, lupines and popcorn flowers. The Wagon Caves area is known for the large valley oaks, up to 100 feet (30 m) tall with trunks 6–7 feet (1.8–2.1 m) across.

The single very large rock comprising the caves are surrounded by brush, grassland and Quercus-Pinus sabiniana woodland. Flora include:

- Muhlenbergia rigens
- Nassella
- Valley oaks

=== Geology ===
The rock strata at the Wagon Caves are a succession of coarse-grained high-density turbidity current deposits. The 0.5 square kilometres (0.19 sq mi) mesa is part of a lenticular sandstone body up to 75 metres (246 ft) thick and several kilometers wide that accumulated within the confines of the Cretaceous–Paleocene submarine canyon. The Salinian block basement is identical to that cut by the Monterey submarine canyon.
