= Zassalete, California =

Zassalete is a former Salinan settlement in Monterey County, California, United States. Its precise location is unknown.
