= Subazama, California =

Subazama is a former Salinan settlement in Monterey County, California, United States. Its precise location is unknown. It was within 20 miles of Mission San Antonio de Padua. The 'z' is pronounced more like a 'tr' (ṭ), and the last half of the name is probably related to the word for 'my house' or village.
