= Tetachoya, California =

Former human settlement in California

Tetachoya is a former Salinan settlement in Monterey County, California, United States.

It was located near Mission San Antonio de Padua, in the Santa Lucia Range. Its precise location is unknown.
