= Old Coast Road =

Old Coast Road may refer to:

- Forrest Highway, in Western Australia
- Old Coast Road (Big Sur), in Big Sur, California, United States
