= Salinan traditional narratives =

Salinan traditional narratives include myths, legends, tales, and oral histories preserved by the Salinan people of the central California coast.

Salinan oral literature, as documented primarily by J. Alden Mason, shows its closest links with that of other central California groups, such as the Yokuts.(See also Traditional narratives (Native California).)

== Sources for Salinan narratives ==
- Gifford, Edward Winslow, and Gwendoline Harris Block. 1930. California Indian Nights. Arthur H. Clark, Glendale, California. (One previously published narrative, pp. 193-194.)
- Margolin, Malcolm. 1993. The Way We Lived: California Indian Stories, Songs, and Reminiscences. First edition 1981. Heyday Books, Berkeley, California. (One myth, p. 135-137, from Mason 1918.)
- Mason, J. Alden. 1912. "The Ethnology of the Salinan Indians". University of California Publications in American Archaeology and Ethnology 10:97-240. Berkeley. (Narratives collected by H. W. Henshaw in 1884 and by the author in 1910, including Earth Diver, with comparative discussion, pp. 186-197.)
- Mason, J. Alden. 1918. "The Language of the Salinan Indians". University of California Publications in American Archaeology and Ethnology 14:1-154. Berkeley. (Narratives in the Antoniano and Migueleño languages, including Earth Diver, Theft of Fire, and Bear and Fawns, pp. 60-93, 100-101-105-116.)
