= Manchester, Monterey County, California =

Manchester Mansfield, Alder Creek
- Ghost town
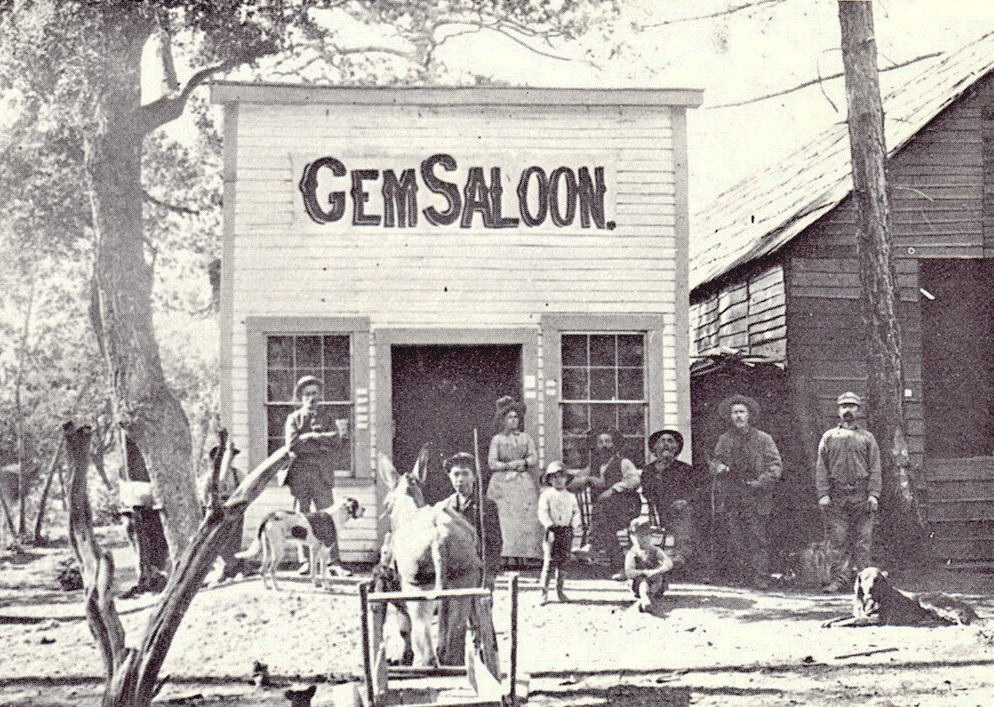
- The Gem Saloon in Manchester, circa 1880

- Location in California
- Coordinates: 35°52′52″N 121°23′33″W
- Country: United States
- State: California
- County: Monterey
- Established: 1875
- Elevation: 135 ft (41 m)

Population (1889)
  - Total: 100
- ZIP code: 93920
- FIPS code: 06-44427

Manchester (sometimes known as Mansfield) was a mining town in the Los Burros Mining District in the southern Big Sur region of Monterey County, California, United States from approximately 1875 to 1895. The town was reached by a 20 miles (32 km) road from King City to Jolon. From Jolon travelers could ride or take a stage or wagon to the Wagon Caves, followed by a difficult 14 miles (23 km) trail over the steep Santa Lucia Mountains to the site, about 4 miles (6.4 km) inland of Cape San Martin. Prospecting began in the area in the 1850s.

In the spring of 1887, after 10 years of varied success, William Dugay Cruikshank discovered lode gold at the head of Alder Creek. He opened the Last Chance Mine, later known as the Buclimo Mine. The Last Chance mine produced about $62,000 (or about $1,163,000 today) in gold ore. The mines were not very productive, and most mining activity ceased by about 1895. Renewed attempts at exploiting the ore in the early 1900s failed. Cruikshank lived on the site of the town until his death in 1937.

== Difficult access ==
To reach Manchester, after 1885 travelers could take the Southern Pacific Railroad to its southern terminus in Soledad. They could then ride horseback, drive their wagons, or ride a stage 37 miles (60 km) south to Jolon. From there an 18 miles (29 km) road was built to the Wagon Caves in the upper San Antonio Valley, a resting point and overnight camp site for those traveling to and from the coast.

Wagons were stored at Wagon Caves for the purpose of hauling items to market and provisions back from Soledad. Travelers switched from horseback to and from Manchester.

There were two trails from Wagon Caves to the coast: the Plaskett/Mansfield Trail to the north, and the Los Burros Trail to the south. Over the Los Burros Trail, it was a 10 miles (16 km) hike to the summit of the Santa Lucia Mountains, followed by a 2 miles (3.2 km) downhill trek to the mines. To the west of Manchester, a few families homesteaded the region around what is known as Lopez Point (known today as Lucia), including the Harlan, Dani, Gamboa, and Lopez families.

== Los Burros Mining District ==
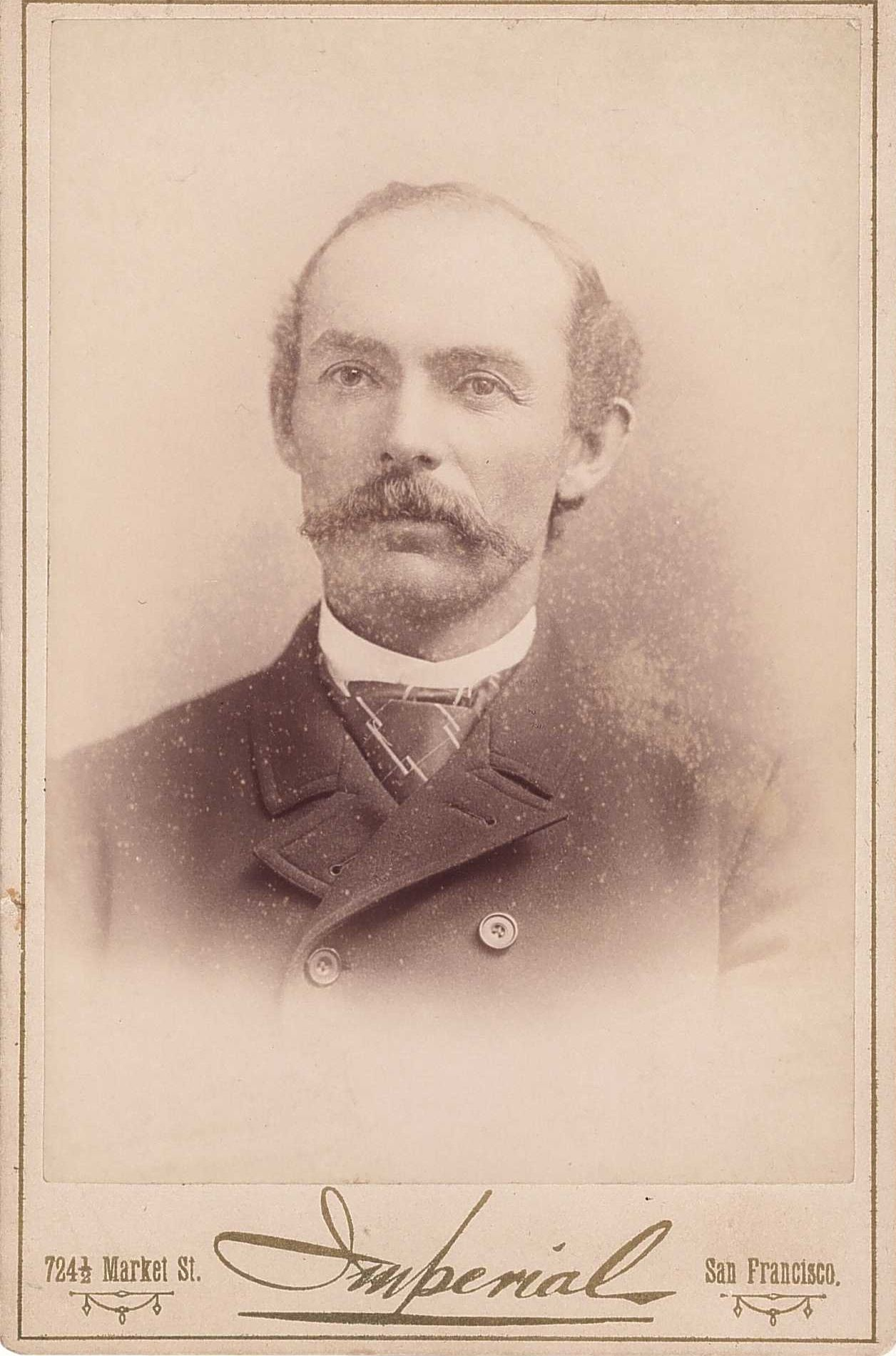
William Dugay Cruikshank in 1915

The district comprised about 8 square miles (21 km^{2}). It was defined as:

Commencing at the Mouth of the San Kapoko [San Carpoforo Creek] following the Pacific Ocean Northerly to Premits [Prewitts] Trail. Thence following said trail to McKerns. Thence following the Nassimienta [Naciemiento River] to the mouth of the Los Burros Creek. Thence to the place of beginning.

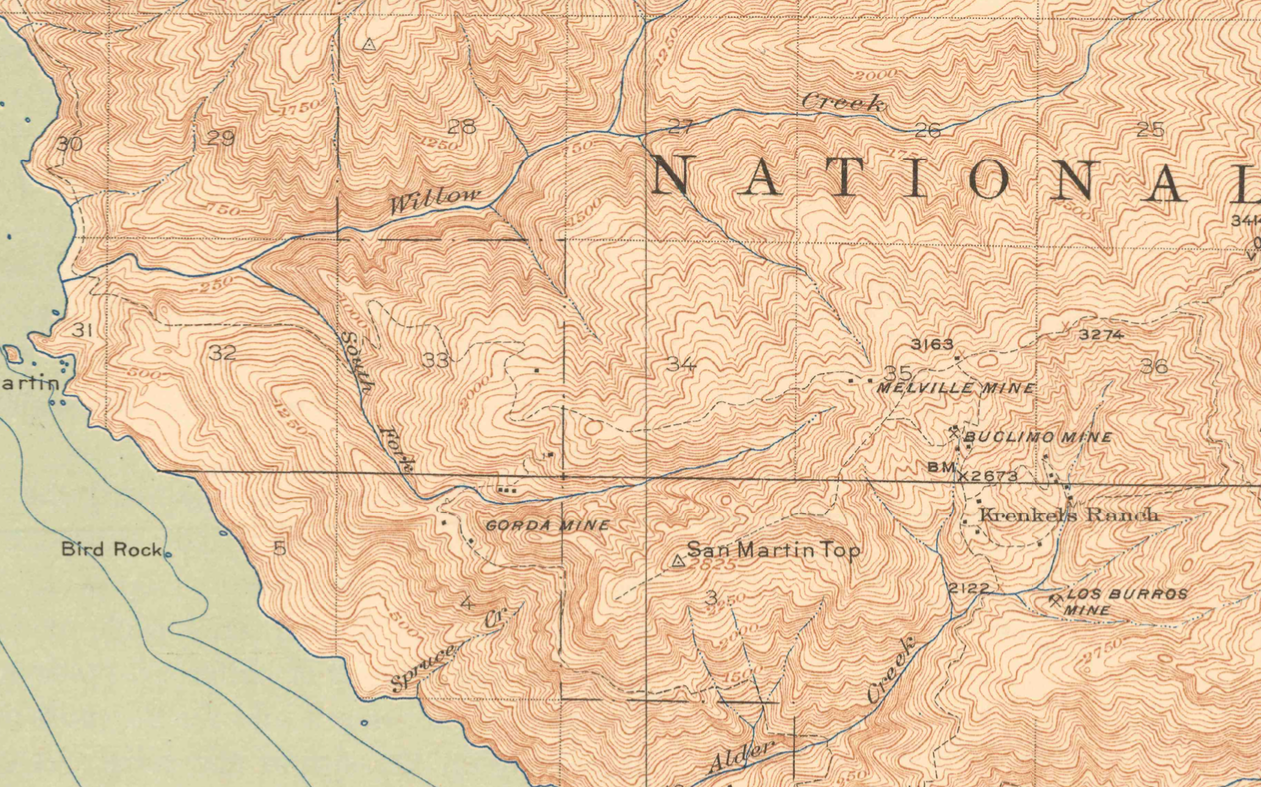
1921 USGS map of mines in the Los Burros mining district

=== Gold discovery ===
Before the arrival of Cruikshank and other Western miners, Chinese miners produced a small quantity of gold from the gravel bed of the San Antonio River near Jolon, and small amounts of placer gold from the coastal ravines of the Santa Lucia Range.

The most valuable gold discovery was made by William Dugay Cruikshank, on March 24, 1887, who called his find the Last Chance mine. The Last Chance mine eventually was 450 feet (140 m) long and dug to a depth of 150 feet (46 m). Cruikshank found five veins which milled at an average of $200 per ton. During the first year of the mining district, 63 claims were recorded. In 1889 the Manchester Mine was dug about 60 feet (18 m) into the mountain; the Melville Mine had a tunnel about 110 feet (34 m) long.

Eventually around 500 claims existed. Many Los Burros mines were registered and renamed, likely filed under several different names. Placer claims were filed along Plaskett Creek, Willow Creek and tributaries, and Alder Creek. Cruikshank, who partnered with James Krinkle, shipped an estimated $62,000 in gold ore from the Last Chance Mine. Since there was no road into the area, the crushed gold ore was sacked and transported on donkeys (hence, los burros) over the Santa Lucia Mountains to the Nacimiento River. From there they were hauled on sleds by mules over about 4 miles (6.4 km) over steep, uphill terrain to the mines.

=== San Martin Rock ===
There was a dog-hole landing south of San Martin Rock near the Plaskett Ranch where mining equipment like the ore crushers and stamp mills were brought by ship. Mules were used to haul the machinery 8 miles (13 km) up the ridge. Cruikshank built hoisting works and a 10-stamp mill which began operating on November 29, 1889.

Another flurry of activity occurred in the early 1900s when placer gold was discovered in gravel and alluvial deposits along various forks of Willow Creek. The entire Willow Creek watershed was prospected, and a large number of pits, shafts, tunnels, open cuts, and adits were explored by miners. The mines were not very productive, and most mining activity ceased by about 1895. Between 1900 and 1909, another 322 claims were filed there. Intermittent small-scale prospecting and development work have continued in the district until the present time. There was a recorded production of several hundred dollars' worth of gold in 1953 and again in 1963. Over 2000 mining claims were located in the district. As of 2023, there were eight active claims..

=== Geology ===
Dark sandstone is most abundant and is also the chief host rock of the gold-bearing deposits. Also present are chert, shale, serpentine, and volcanic rocks. Most of the gold has been recovered from small lenticular ore shoots in oxidized zones near the surface. The sulfides, which consist of fine-grained pyrite and small amounts of chalcopyrite and arsenopyrite generally, are low in gold content. Most of the placer gold has come from Willow Creek, and much of it was concentrated as coarse ragged fragments. Very small amounts have been found in Alder, Plaskett, and Salmon creeks.

=== Mineral production ===
The mining occurred in three nearly parallel quartz veinlets, parallel to a layer of sandstone. The gold was removed via open cuts, shafts, and drift tunnels. The Last Chance reached a maximum depth of 160 feet (49 m). In 1902, large gold nuggets were found on Spruce Creek and placer gold was found in Willow Creek. Ancona, Buclimo $62,000; Bushnell, Gorda, Grizzly, Mariposa, Melville, New York, Plaskett (placer) $18,000; Spruce (placer) $22,000. The value of the total output is estimated to be about $150,000 (or about $2,813,000 today).

== History ==
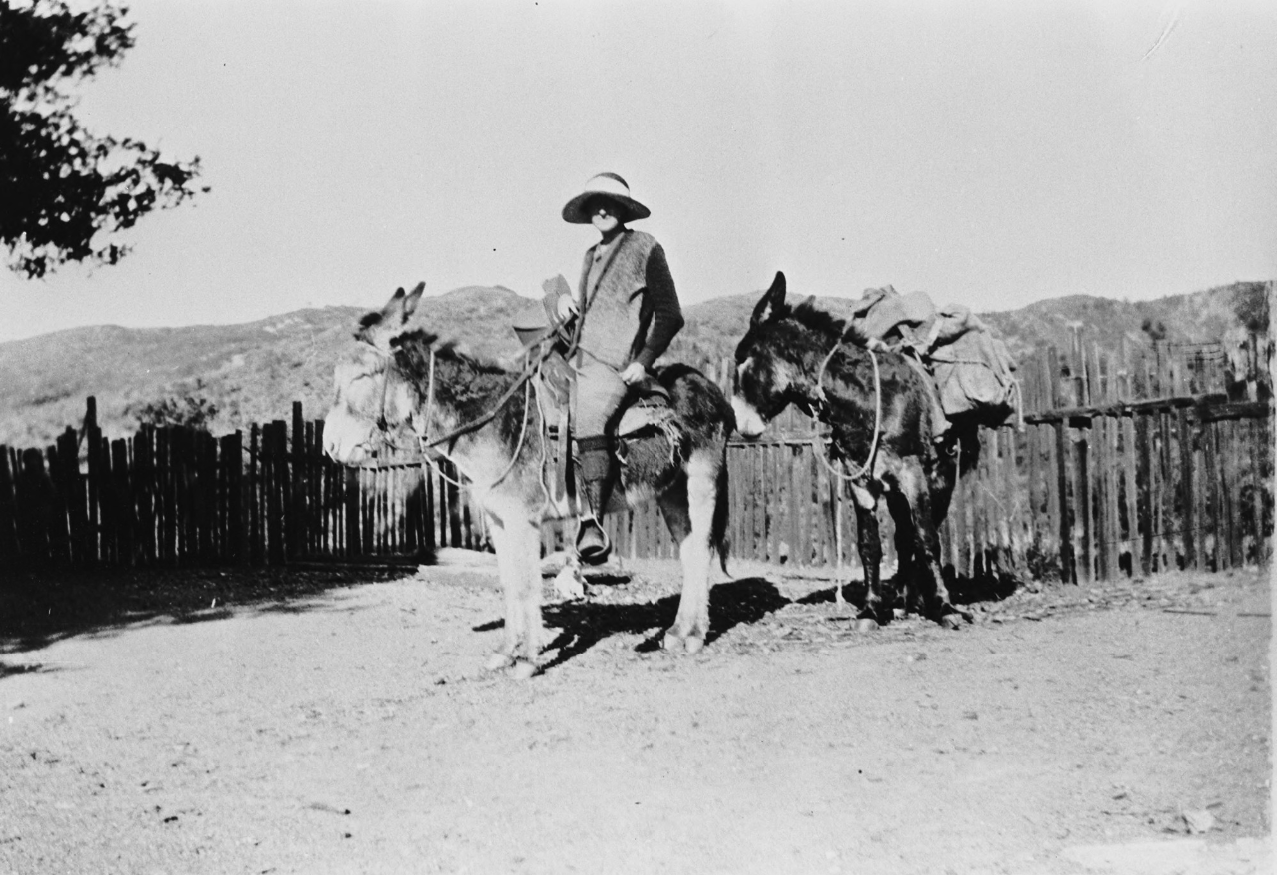
Monterey County librarian Anne Hayden delivers books on a burro to the residents of the Los Burros mining camp in 1918. Traveling from Salinas to Manchester took about two days.

Manchester was located a few hundred yards downhill from the Last Chance mine. The Mansfield post office, named after Curnell Mansfield of nearby Pacific Valley and his family, was established in Manchester on September 14, 1889. The name Mansfield was given to the post office because Manchester was already in use by Manchester in northern California. E.S. Harrison, author or "Monterey County", published in 1890, reported that 100 people lived in Manchester. A petition to build a road to the mines was put before the county Board of Supervisors in January 1890, but never advanced.

In October 1889, a visitor reported "9 or 10 frame houses at Mansfield, among them two boarding houses and four saloons." The town had three stamp mills, four stores, five saloons, a dance hall, restaurant, hotel, a barber shop, post office, blacksmith, a small one-room school, mess halls, bunkhouses, a few cabins, a cemetery, and a dance hall. The school was established in July 1890, when Susie R. Bird was hired as its first teacher. About 350 people lived in the town at the height of its popularity.

=== Fires ===
A fire destroyed the town in late 1890. Portions were rebuilt, but by 1895 the boom had begun to fade. The Mansfield post office closed in 1897.

Additional fires destroyed most traces of the town with the exception of the remnants of the stamp mills. In September 1970, the Buckeye fire burned through most of the Los Burros Mining District and destroyed nearly all of the remaining miners shacks and cabins. The US Forest Service later destroyed any that remained.

=== Cruikshank dies ===
In mid-December, 1937, it was discovered that 81-year-old William D. "Billy" Cruikshank had not been seen since November 15. Billy went missing while traveling the trail between his cabin in Manchester and Jolon. The sheriff organized a posse on December 15 to look for him. The body of Cruikshank was eventually discovered on a trail in March 1944 on what had become the Hunter-Liggett Army Reservation. The Cruikshank Trail, Lower Cruikshank Camp, and Upper Cruikshank Camp in the Silver Peak Wilderness are named for him.

== Memorial ==
A historical marker was established by E Clampus Vitus on Will Creek Road at the former location of Manchester.

Capitol of Monterey County’s Los Burros Mining District.

In the spring of 1887 the Last Chance Mine was discovered by W.D. Cruikshank and later worked by the Krinkle family. Down the hill (from the mine) around this spot, a thriving town of hotels, stores, and seven saloons sprang up. Other mines followed but no records of how much gold was taken exist. Served by the Mansfield P.O. from 1889 to 1897 a series of fires destroyed all traces of this historic ghost mining town.

Dedicated this 12 day of October 5996 by Monterey Viejo 1846 E. Clampus Vitus. R.I.P.
