= Kirk Creek Campground =

Historic site in Lucia, California United States

- U.S. National Register of Historic Places
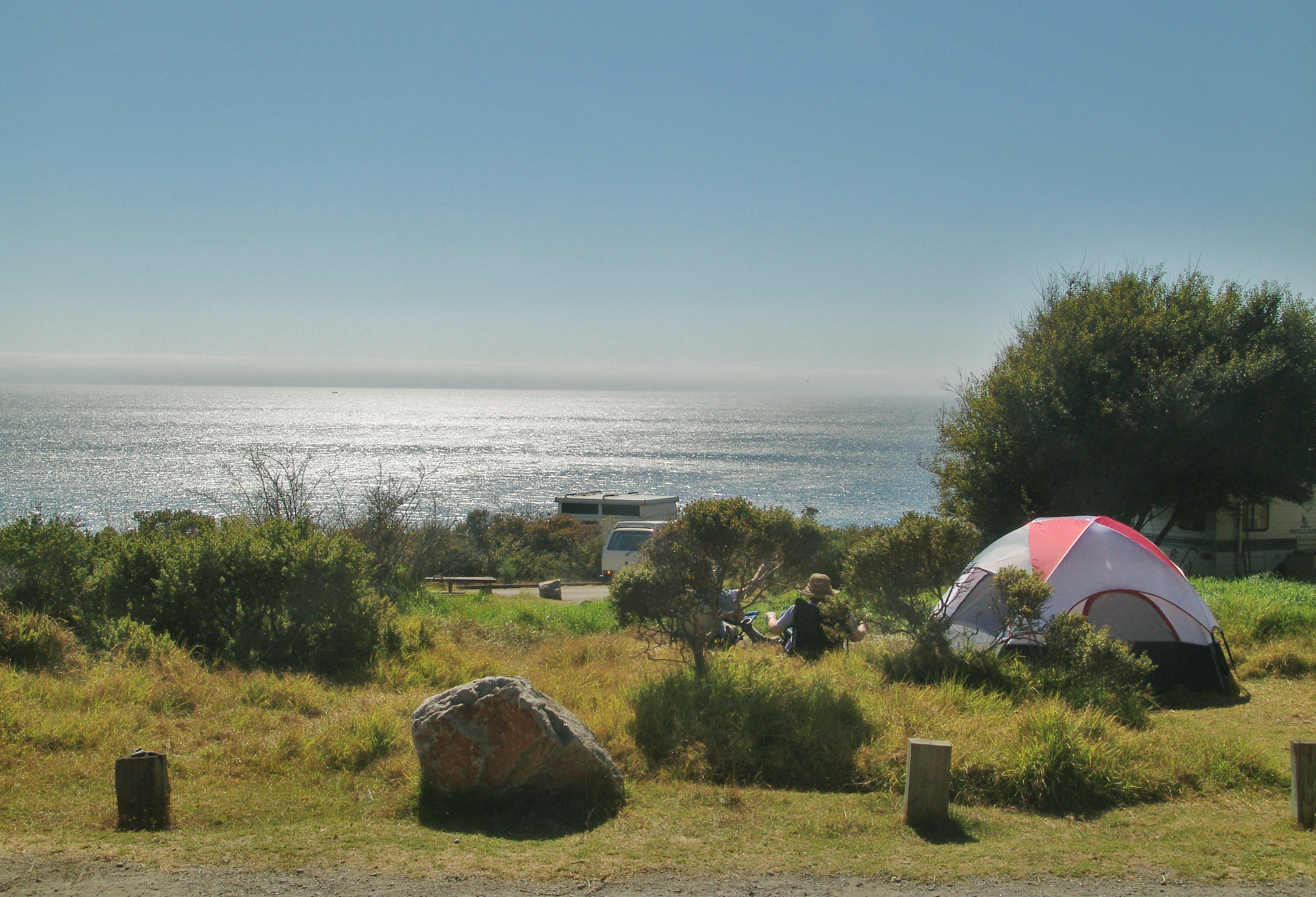
- Kirk Creek Campground off Route 1

- Location within California
- Location: Lucia, California
- Coordinates: 35°59′24″N 121°29′44″W
- Area: 1.6 acres (0.65 ha)
- Built: 1926; 100 years ago
- NRHP reference No.: 74000538
- Added to NRHP: December 31, 1974

Kirk Creek Campground is a USFS campground located near Lucia, California. Near the campground is an archaeological site dating to the Middle Period of the Big Sur coast in California. It was listed on the National Register of Historic Places on December 31, 1974.

== History ==
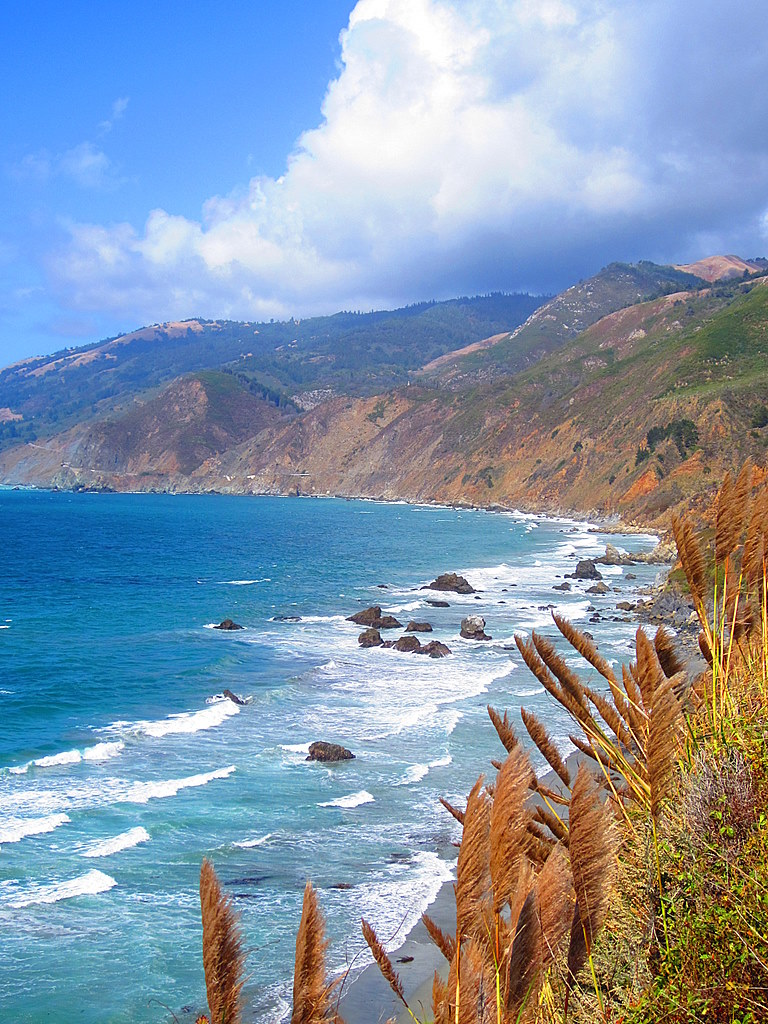
View from Kirk Creek campground

In 1974, excavation of 60 cubic yards (46 m^{3}) was done at the Kirk Creek site, CA-MNT-238, with funding provided by the California Division of Highways. Three decades later, an analysis, interpretation, and documentation of the site data was completed. The site stands as the sole intact and well-documented archaeological assemblage from the Middle Period, or Archaic Period, along the Big Sur coast, encompassing evidence of a short-term Early Period hunting camp.

The regional analyses cover chronological data from coastal sites, obsidian hydration, Olivella shell, subsistence patterns, and a Late Period transition to the interior. Kirk Creek Campground excavations began in 1974 with projectile points, Olivella beads, and bone tools being found at the site.
