= Limekiln State Park =

State historic park in California, United States

- IUCN category III (natural monument or feature)
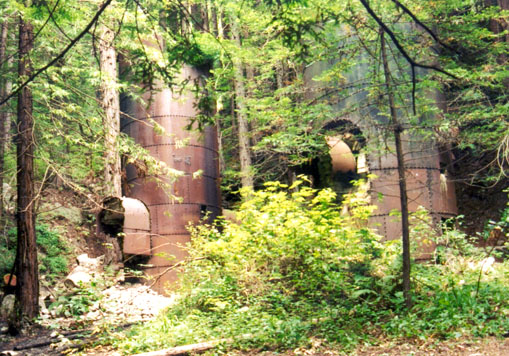
- Two of the limekilns for which the park is named

- Location within California Location within the United States
- Location: Monterey County, California, United States
- Nearest city: Big Sur, California
- Coordinates: 36°0′36″N 121°31′6″W
- Area: 711 acres (288 ha)
- Established: 1994
- Governing body: California Department of Parks and Recreation

Limekiln State Park is a California state park on the Big Sur coast. It contains four lime kilns from an 1887–1890 lime-calcining operation, plus a beach, redwood forest, and 100-foot (30 m) Limekiln Falls. It is located 2 miles (3.2 km) south of Lucia on Big Sur Coast Highway. The 711-acre (288 ha) park was established in 1994.

== Cultural history ==
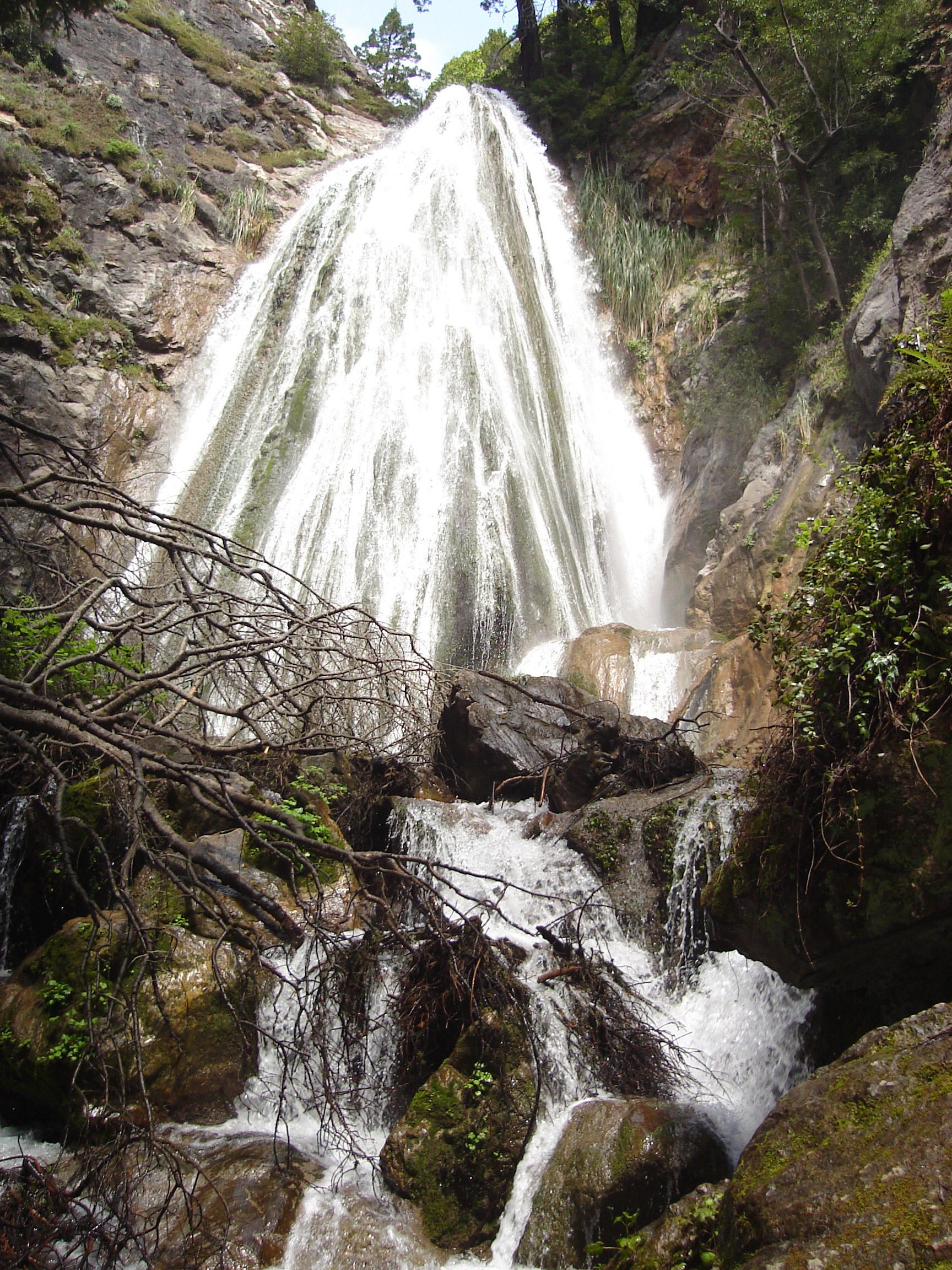
Limekiln Falls

From 1887 to 1890 the Rockland Lime and Lumber Company harvested limestone from a scree slope and fed it into four iron and stone lime kilns they erected onsite. Long exposure to very hot fires extracted lime. Barrels of lime were slid on a cable out to Rockland Cove, where they were loaded onto ships at a dog-hole port at the mouth of Limekiln Creek. The lime was a key ingredient in the cement that was used for construction in San Francisco and Monterey. After three years the company had exhausted most of the limestone as well as the redwood used to fire the kilns. A .5-mile (0.80 km) trail leads from the Big Sur Coast Highway to the ruins of the lime smelting operations, which include four kilns and some stone walls and bridge abutments.

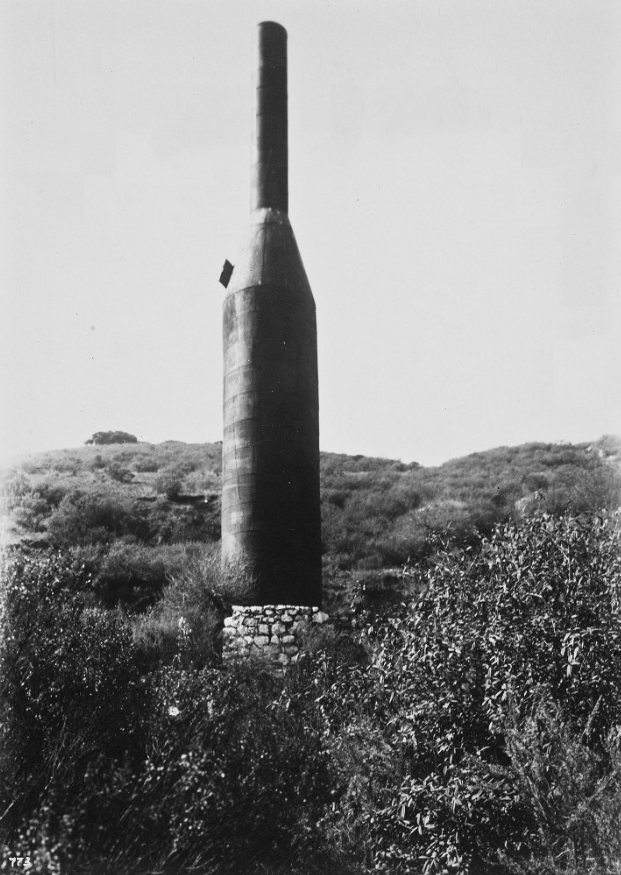
Remains of one of the kilns in Lime Kiln Canyon in 1920

The redwood forest recovered from this industrial use, but in 1984 a private landowner planned to log the west fork of Limekiln Creek. Conservationists objected and succeeded in getting the land preserved as a public park. The campground was family-owned before it was then sold and operated by the Esalen Institute for a number of years. The property was transferred to the California state park system and opened in September 1995.

Limekiln State Park was heavily damaged in the Chalk Fire of September and October 2008. In total the Chalk Fire burned 25.4 mi^{2} (66 km^{2}) in California. Due to the damage the park was closed, not reopening until July 2, 2010. At that time the Limekiln Falls Trail remained closed, but reopened in summer 2011. The Hare Creek Trail is shorter due to damage related to the Chalk Fire.

== History ==
Limekiln State Park was one of many state parks threatened with closure in 2008. Those closures were ultimately avoided by cutting hours and maintenance system-wide. The park was again threatened with closure, along with 70 other California state parks in July 2012 as part of a deficit reduction program. A partner organization has signed an agreement to keep the park open.

== Recreation ==
Limekiln State Park has a small but popular campground with 31 sites among the redwoods and 11 sites with an ocean view. Easy trails lead to the lime kilns or up Hare Creek Canyon. Another leads to Limekiln Falls on the east fork of Limekiln Creek.

== See also ==
- List of California state parks
