= Andrew Molera State Park =

State park in California, United States

- IUCN category III (natural monument or feature)
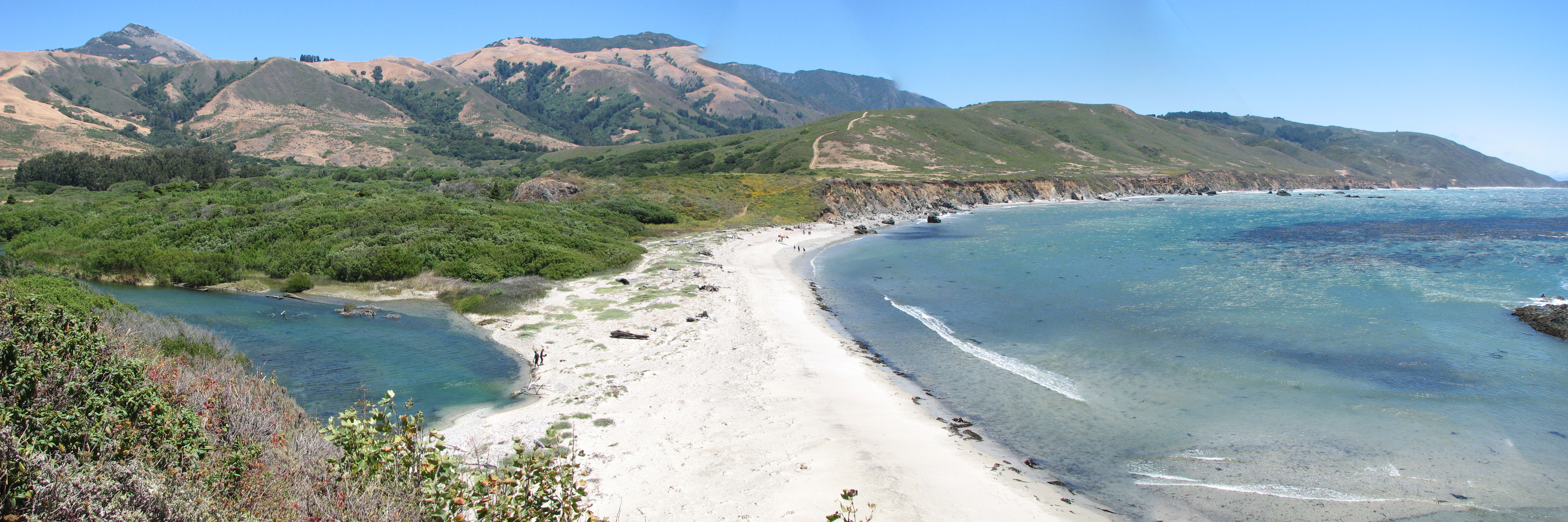
- The beach in Andrew Molera State Park

- Location within California Location within the United States
- Location: Monterey County, California, United States
- Nearest city: Carmel-by-the-Sea, California
- Coordinates: 36°17′N 121°50′W
- Area: 4,766 acres (1,929 ha)
- Established: 1968
- Governing body: California Department of Parks and Recreation

Andrew Molera State Park is a 7.5-square-mile (19-square-kilometer), relatively undeveloped state park on the Big Sur coast of California, United States, preserving land as requested by former owner Frances Molera. Situated at the mouth of the Big Sur River, the property was part of the Rancho El Sur land grant, and later owned by Californio pioneer John Bautista Rogers Cooper and his descendants. Cooper's grandchildren Andrew and Frances Molera inherited the property from their mother in 1918. Andrew popularized the artichoke in California in 1922, and died in 1931. In 1965, Frances sold the property to The Nature Conservancy, stipulating that the park to be created should be named for her brother.

== Activities ==
Activities at the park include hiking, fishing and beachcombing, with miles of trails winding through redwood groves, meadows, beaches, and hilltops. A primitive walk-in trail camp, popular with hikers and bikers, is located approximately one-third of a mile from the parking area. It is considered the most reliable surfing area in Big Sur.

The park is 20 miles (32 km) south of Carmel-by-the-Sea on State Route 1.

=== Features ===
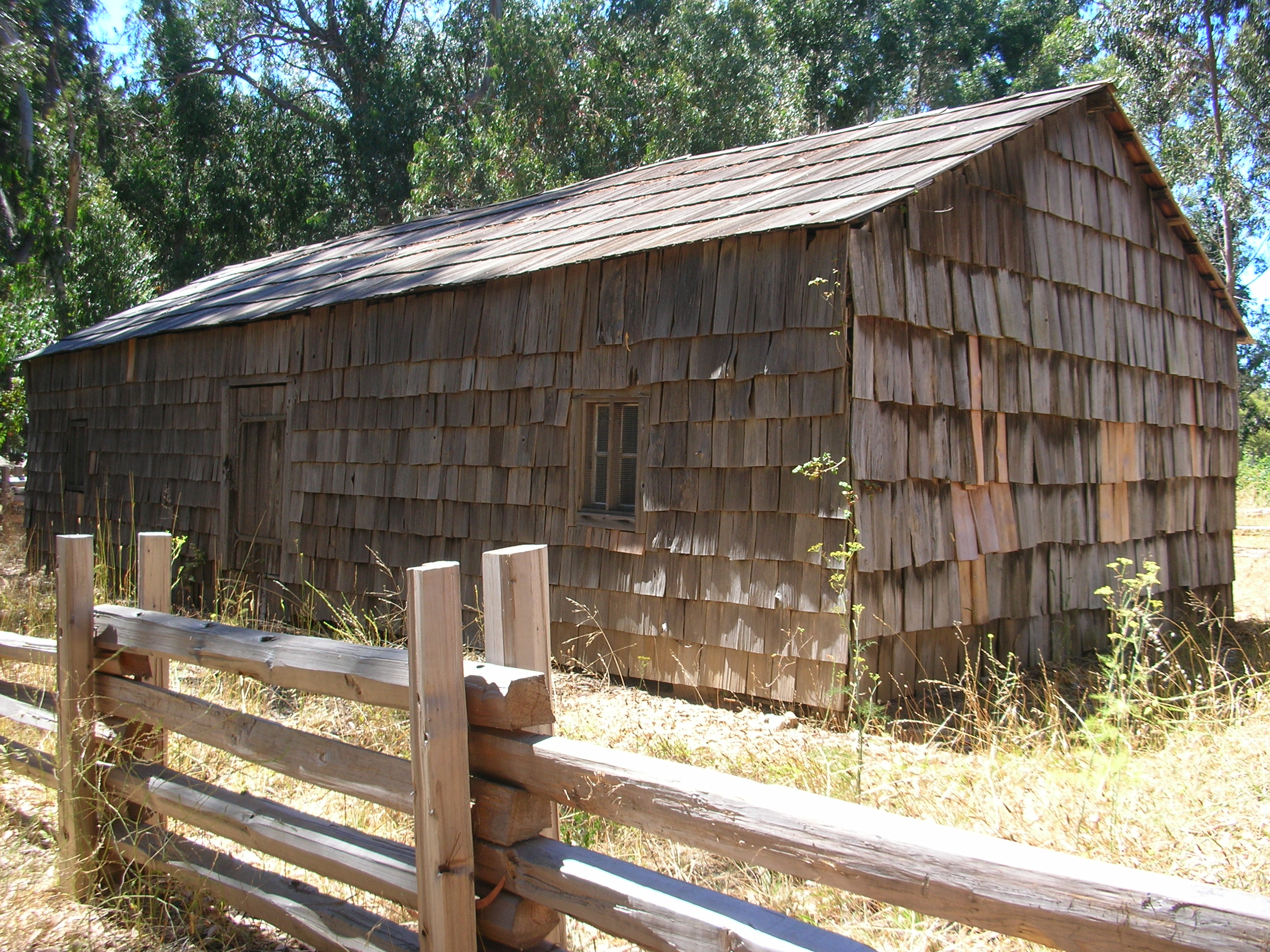
The Cooper Cabin

Andrew Molera State Park features the historic Cooper Cabin, built in 1861 or 1862. It is the oldest structure in Big Sur. Fur trader John Bautista Rogers Cooper was Andrew Molera's grandfather.

The house used by the ranch foreman has been preserved and is used as a museum. It includes displays of Big Sur's Native American and pioneer history, artists' exhibits, and historical artifacts. The museum is normally open mid-day on weekends during the summer, and in the winter when volunteers are available. The museum is located about .2 miles (0.32 km) south of the parking lot. As of March 2022, the museum is closed for exhibit cleaning and updates.

The Ventana Wildlife Society has established a Discovery Center within the park. The Discovery Center includes exhibits on local wildlife, including the California condor, and a bird banding laboratory. Scientists and other laboratory employees give regular tours of Andrew Molera State Park, explaining the flora and fauna that are unique to the area.

The park also features a year-round waterfall, 40-foot (12 m) Highbridge Falls. Other nearby waterfalls include Limekiln Falls, Salmon Creek Falls, McWay Falls in Julia Pfeiffer Burns State Park, and Pfeiffer Falls in Pfeiffer Big Sur State Park.

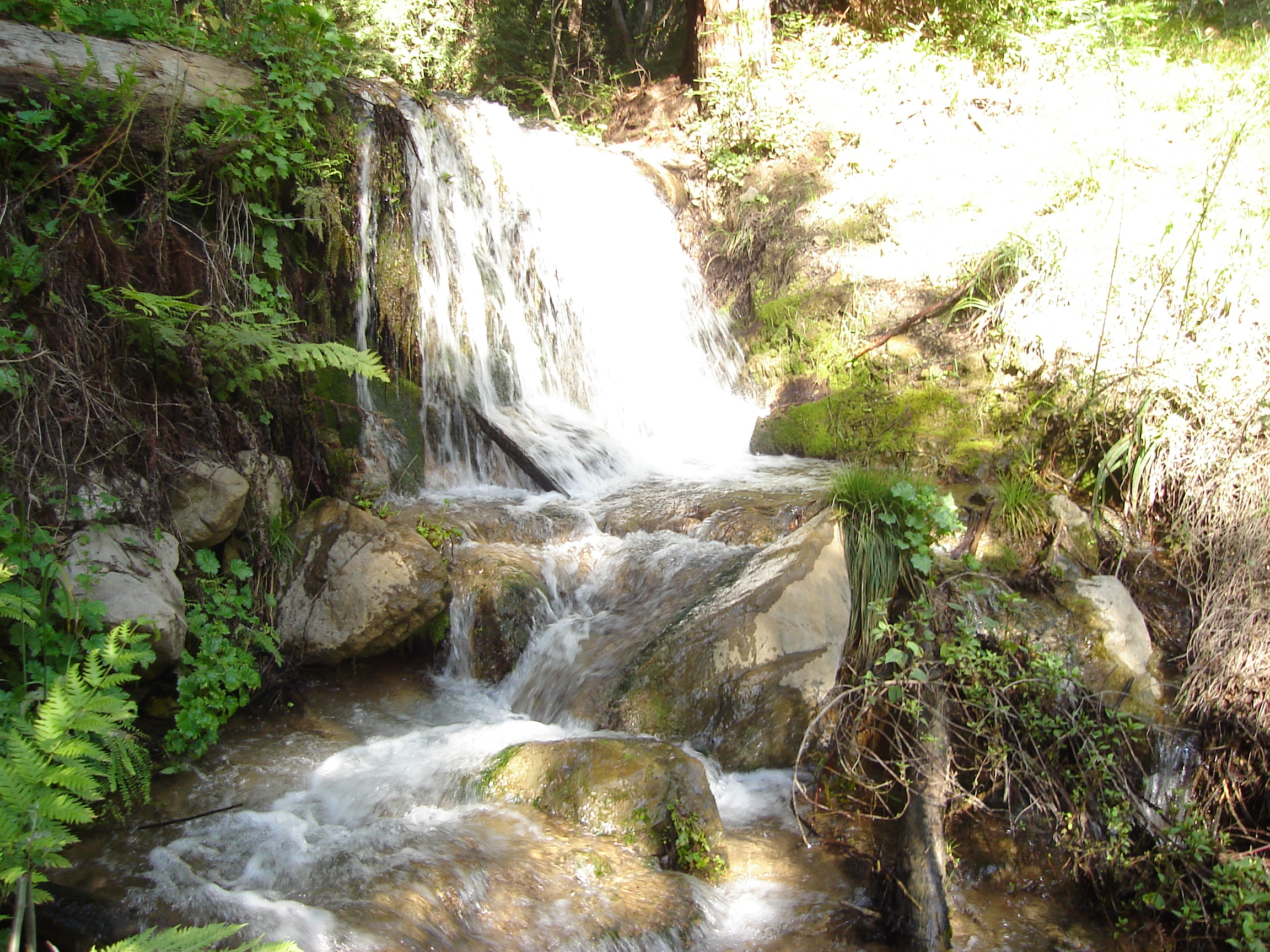
Highbridge Falls

=== Recreation ===
Andrew Molera State Park has over 20 miles (32 km) of hiking trails. Some run along the shore, others along the Big Sur River, while still others climb to high ridges with views of the entire Big Sur coast.

The only camping available in the park is in a 24-site walk-in campground. Reservations are strongly encouraged for all campsites. There are no first-come, first-served campsites. The campground is particularly popular with European visitors. No dogs are allowed on the trails or campground.

=== Marine protected areas ===
Point Sur State Marine Reserve and Marine Conservation Area are marine protected areas offshore from Andrew Molera State Park. Like underwater parks, these marine protected areas help conserve ocean wildlife and marine ecosystems.

== History ==
John Bautista Rogers Cooper traded Rancho Bolsa del Potrero y Moro Cojo in the northern Salinas Valley with Juan Bautista Alvarado for the Rancho El Sur where the state park is located today. When the Mexican government ceded California to the United States after the Mexican–American War, the Land Act of 1851 required grantees to provide proof of their title. Cooper filed a claim for Rancho El Sur with the Public Land Commission in 1852, and he received the legal land patent after years of litigation in 1866.

Cooper's son John Bautista Henry Cooper built a home on the ranch in 1899, but died soon after. John B.H. Cooper's sister Francisca Guadalupe Amelia Cooper inherited the southern two sections comprising 7.3 mi^{2} (19 km^{2}) of Rancho El Sur. When she died, her two children Andrew J. and Francisca (known as Frances) Molera inherited the land, although they lived their adult lives in San Francisco. The ranch became known as the Molera Ranch.

Andrew J. Molera owned property in the Castroville area, and encouraged farmers to grow artichokes in 1922. They became a major crop in the Salinas Valley. Molera, who was very obese, died of a sudden heart attack in 1931. His sister Frances became the sole owner of the family's Big Sur property. She arranged in 1965, almost 100 years after her grandfather John B.R. Cooper had gained title, to sell 3.4 mi^{2} (8.8 km^{2}) (Section 4 of the original Rancho El Sur) of the southern portion of the original Cooper land grant west of Highway 1 to The Nature Conservancy with the intent that it should become a state park. The conservancy held the shoreline property in trust until the state of California could finance the purchase of the land.

Frances Molera stipulated that the park should be named Andrew Molera State Park in honor of her brother. She also added provisions to the sale requiring that the land remain relatively undeveloped. She died in 1968. When the California state park administration began to propose considerable development for the park, the Nature Conservancy threatened to revoke the sale arrangement, and the state backed down. The remaining 4.15 mi^{2} (10.7 km^{2}) of Frances Molera's half of the original Rancho El Sur east of Highway 1 was purchased by the state soon after her death. The northern 11 mi^{2} (28 km^{2}) of John. B.R. Cooper's share of the Rancho El Sur comprising 13 parcels is the modern-day El Sur Ranch.

== See also ==
- List of California state parks
