= Point Sur State Marine Reserve and Marine Conservation Area =

Protected area on California's coast

Point Sur State Marine Reserve Point Sur State Marine Conservation Area
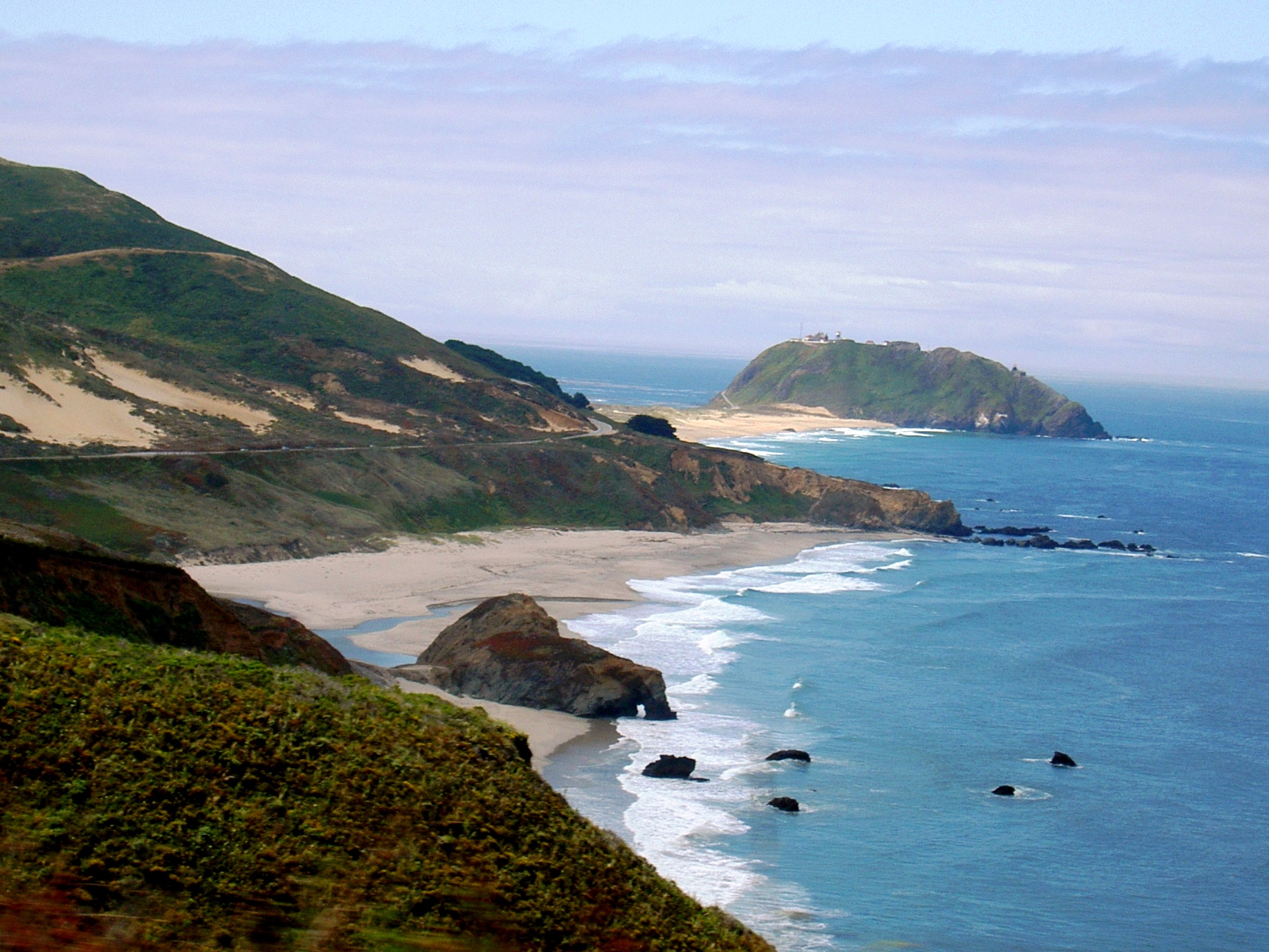
- Point Sur

- Location within California Location within the United States
- Location: Big Sur, California, United States
- Nearest city: Monterey, California
- Coordinates: 36°16′41.9″N 121°55′11.7″W
- Established: 2007
- Governing body: California Department of Fish and Game

Point Sur State Marine Reserve (SMR) and Point Sur State Marine Conservation Area (SMCA) are two adjoining marine protected areas that lie offshore of Point Sur, part of the Big Sur area on California's central coast. The combined area of these marine protected areas is 19.68 square miles (51.0 km^{2}). The SMR protects all marine life within its boundaries. Fishing and taking of all living marine resources is prohibited in the SMR. Within the SMCA, fishing and taking of all living marine resources is prohibited except the commercial and recreational take of salmon and albacore.

== History ==
Point Sur SMR and Point Sur SMCA were established in September 2007 by the California Fish & Game Commission. They are two of 29 marine protected areas adopted during the first phase of the Marine Life Protection Act Initiative. The Marine Life Protection Act Initiative (or MLPAI) is a collaborative public process to create a statewide network of marine protected areas along the California coastline. Today, there are a total of 124 marine protected areas in California.

== Geography and natural features ==
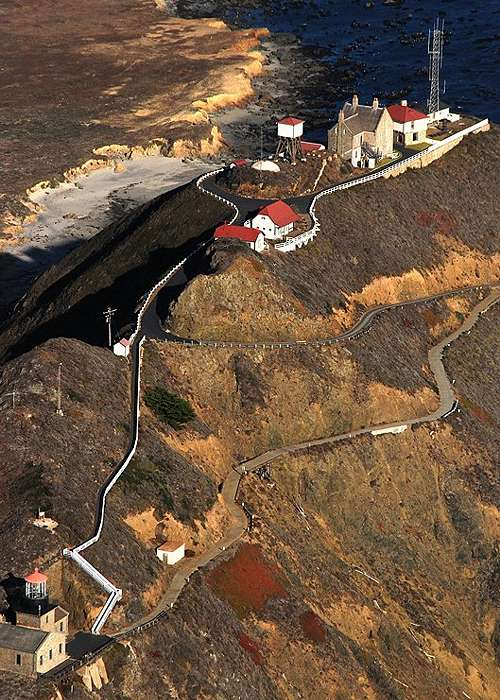
Point Sur Light

These two marine protected areas adjoin each other off the coast of Point Sur. The Big Sur coastline is known for its spectacular and rugged scenery. The sites are adjacent to Andrew Molera State Park and Point Sur State Historic Park. The Point Sur SMR extends from Point Sur in the north to Cooper Point in the south and begins at the coastline and extends to the west. The Point Sur SMCA is directly adjacent to Point Sur SMR, further to the west.

== Habitat and wildlife ==
The Point Sur marine protected areas contain a wide diversity of habitats that support a range of fish, seabirds and invertebrate species. The protected lee of Point Sur supports a large kelp bed that provides a shelter and nursery habitat to rockfish and other species. Remote from ports and urban development, the Point Sur Marine protected areas protect one of the few remaining areas in central California that support large, healthy fish populations and pristine habitat.

Sea otters, sea lions, and harbor seals live along the shore, and abalone and mussels can be found along the coast. Every year gray whales, humpback whales, and blue whales migrate past Point Sur. The kelp forests of the Point Sur SMCA are home to cabezon, vermillion rockfish, and blue fish, while mola mola live near the ocean surface. Spotted ratfish have been spotted in the Point Sur SMCA near the ocean floor. Migrating birds shelter and nest on nearshore rocks, including gulls, cormorants, guillemots, ashy storm-petrels, Cassin’s auklet, and tufted puffins.

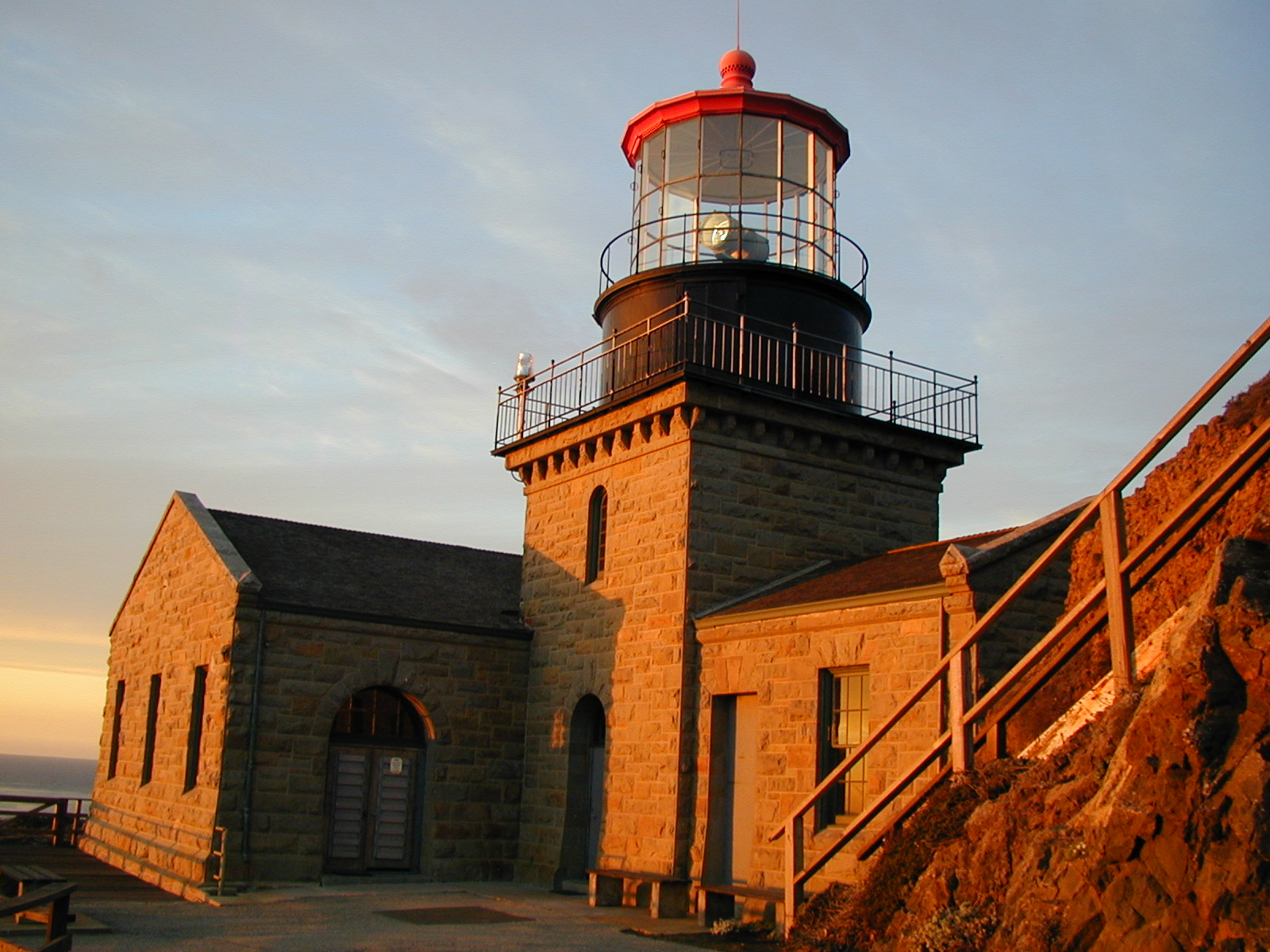
Point Sur Lighthouse in 2004

== Recreation and nearby attractions ==
Andrew Molera State Park, adjacent to Point Sur SMR, has miles of hiking trails and a primitive walk-in camp. Point Sur State Historic Park features the Point Sur Lighthouse, the only complete turn-of-the-century lighthouse open to the public in California. The light station is on the National Register of Historic Places. Guided walking tours are available year round for both the Point Sur Lighthouse and the former Point Sur Naval Facility within Point Sur State Historic Park.

California's marine protected areas encourage recreational and educational uses of the ocean. Activities such as kayaking, diving, snorkeling, and swimming are allowed unless otherwise restricted.

== Scientific monitoring ==
As specified by the Marine Life Protection Act, select marine protected areas along California's central coast are being monitored by scientists to track their effectiveness and learn more about ocean health. Similar studies in marine protected areas of the Santa Barbara Channel Islands have already detected gradual improvements in fish size and number.

Local scientific and educational institutions involved in the monitoring include Stanford University's Hopkins Marine Station, University of California Santa Cruz, Moss Landing Marine Laboratories and Cal Poly San Luis Obispo. Research methods include hook-and-line sampling, intertidal and scuba diver surveys, and Remote Operated Vehicle (ROV) submarines.
