= Dog-hole ports =

Ports and harbors of the United States

Bixby Landing in Big Sur during 1911 was used to transport supplies and products to and from ships off shore.

Dog-hole ports were the small, rural ports on the West Coast of the United States between Central California and Southern Oregon that operated between the mid-1800s until the 1930s. They were commonly called dog-holes because the schooners that served them would have to be able to "turn around in a harbor barely small enough for a dog".

== Available ports ==
There are only five major Pacific Ocean seaports in the United States between Canada and Mexico: Seattle; Portland, Oregon; San Francisco, Los Angeles, and San Diego. Of the other ports on the Redwood Coast only Caspar, Crescent City, Humboldt, Noyo and Mendocino could serve as ports for the largest coastwise and small deepwater vessels. Another 20 could hold medium-sized coasters. The rest, commonly known as dog-holes, could only serve the smallest of the ships.

The Redwood Coast extended from San Simeon in California's Central coast to the Chetco River on Oregon's Southwestern coast. This coast is dominated by cliffs and bluffs uplifted from the ocean floor by waves and currents from marine terraces. Since there are few rivers to create ports, the topography made it difficult to handle cargo. Usually, lumber schooners were the only connecters between the lumber ports and the major cities. They brought all types of supplies to the ports and returned with boards, farm produce, and even livestock. Most of the hulls were built on the Pacific Coast and towed to San Francisco loaded with cargo for finishing.

== Types of ports ==
Chutes and hoists were a West Coast innovation because of the high cliffs along the coast and the lack of harbors.

Mooring under a cliff to a buoy or by anchor, the ship received cargo down an apron chute or, later a wire hoist. It usually took two days to load. All these ports were full of rocks both hidden and exposed. There were undertows and cross-rip currents and continual changing sandbars. The dog-hole operators obtained franchises to build and manage the chutes. When a ship entered a port, it moored to a buoy (often a log anchored to the bottom) and would be warped or winched into position for loading. A ship’s boat, crewed by three seamen and the second mate, carried the eight inch mooring lines to the buoy.

=== Gravity chute ===
The gravity chutes were troughs allowing cargo to be sent down a cliff to a ship. Besides bagged goods, the chutes were used to load other cargo, such as live hogs.

=== Cable hoist ===
High-strength steel cable or wire became available in the 1870s. The cable hoist was a big improvement over the gravity chutes. They could load an entire sling of lumber at one time while the apron chutes could only load board by board. The cable hoist could be used to discharge, and load, cargo.

Where prevailing weather conditions permitted, shippers built wharves allowing the ships to come alongside and load directly from the dock. The wire hoist permitted ships with deeper drafts to load since they did not need to approach so close to shore. The wire hoists continued in use until after World War I and were discontinued in the north by the start of World War II and along the central coast after the opening of the Coast highway.

== Northern California ==
Along the rugged Sonoma coast during the 1800s, timber harvesters used small indentations in the coastal cliffs and headlands to load redwood lumber and other timber products onto small schooners and steamers. In 2016, the California State Parks and the National Oceanic and Atmospheric Administration Office of National Marine Sanctuaries surveyed sites.

- Duncan's Landing
- Russian Gulch Landing
- Fort Ross Cove
- Gerstle Cove
- Fisk Mill Cove
- Timber Cove
- Stillwater Cove
- Stewarts Point
- Bihler’s Landing
- Del Mar Landing

== Central California ==
Along the Big Sur coast between Monterey and San Simeon, California, a number of landings were built to allow residents to receive supplies that could not be brought overland and businesses to load goods for transshipment to major ports on the coast. These landings were built in the last three decades of the 1800s. They employed either a hoist and cable or apron-style chute system. The hoist and cable system typically extended from a platform on a cliff ledge or marine terrace. The cable style chute was used at eight of the fourteen landings along the coast. Two apron-style chutes were located at Bixby Landing and Coal Chute Point.

As late as 1910, the winding, narrow coast road was still very rough and ended at the Pfeiffer Resort on the Big Sur River. It could be impassible in winter. Most goods including cheese produced on the Cooper Ranch were still shipped by boat to Monterey.

Known ports include:

- Coal Chute
- Strader’s Landing
- Notley’s Landing
- Bixby Landing
- Point Sur
- Big Sur River Mouth
- Partington’s Seaview Landing
- Anderson / Saddle Rock Landing
- Harlan Landing
- Rockland Landing
- Mill Creek Landing Later known as Bixby Landing
- Pacific Valley Landing
- Cape San Martin Landing
- Alder Creek Landing

== Loading the ships ==
There were four major methods of loading ships at dog-holes: lightering, slide, apron or gravity chutes, wire or trapeze chutes, and wharfing.

The Pacific Rural Press wrote in 1884, "San Francisco and San Diego are the only two good harbors on this long line of coast." It described chutes from 60 to 600 feet long consisting of wood forming a shallow trough that extended from a headland or high wharf or pier to water deep enough to allow vessels to load goods.

At first shippers used lighters to ferry cargo out to anchored ships, but this was a slow process. By 1860 a gravity chute called an apron or slide chute was developed. It consisted of an A-frame on the bluff and an apron that could be adjusted to the height of the ships’ decks. Lumbermen sent down cargo from the bluff, which was as high as 150 feet (46 m), by the chute powered by gravity. A hinged gate covered with iron rode in the chute governed the speed of the wood. A primitive brake called a clapper provided additional control over the speed. It was a moveable plank tongue positioned on the outer end of the apron. It was the responsibility of the clapperman to regulate the speed by a lever. It was dangerous work; if the seaman slipped or the brakeman was slow, the lumber could kill or injure the crew member.

Mill operators generally built their lumber loading facilities on the lee (usually the south) side of a point. This allowed the land to break the force of the waves and caused the direction of the swells to roll straight into the cove. Schooners moored with their bows pointed directly into the waves so that they pitched (the ship going up and down along its long axis) but did not roll (going up and down along its crosswise axis). This made loading easier.

Along the Big Sur coast, powdered lime was packed into barrels that were then attached to cable strung from the coastal cliff. The cargo was hoisted in slings from the landing along a cable winched about 50 yards out into the Pacific Ocean, where it was loaded aboard coastal schooners. The schooners were moored to deadeyes embedded in rocks of the adjacent shore.

== Other sources ==
- Carranco, Lynwood; Labbe, John T (1975) Logging the Redwoods (Caxton Press) ISBN 9780870043734
- Carranco, Lynwood (1982) Redwood Lumber Industry (Golden West Books) ISBN 9780870950841
- Ryan, Terrence (Fall 2009) "The Pacific Coast Lumber Trade" in The California Territorial Quarterly (Paradise, California: Bill & Penny Anderson (79): 24–35. ISSN 1080-7594)
- Ryan, Terrence (Fall 2010) "The Development of Pacific Coast Lumber Ship " in Nautical Research Journal (New York: Nautical Research Guild Inc.) 55 (3): 141–160) ISSN 0738-7245)
- Ryan, Terrence (Spring 2012) "Pacific Coast Steam Schooners" in PowerShips (Cranston, R.I.: The Steamship Historical Society of America, Inc. (281): 38-45. ISSN 0039-0844)
- Ryan, Terrence (March 2015) "The Redwood Fleet " in Sea Classics (North Hollywood, CA: Challenge Publications (Vol. 48, No. 3): 54-67. ISSN 0048-9867)

== Related Reading ==
- Haugan, Jevne (1999) Sailing with the Winds of History: A Pacific Coast Chronicle (AuthorHouse) ISBN 978-1585002856
- Jackson, Walter A. (1969) The Doghole Schooners (Volcano, California: The California Traveler)
- Martin, Wallace E., compiler (1983) Sail & Steam on the Northern California Coast: 1850-1900 (San Francisco: National Maritime Museum Association in Cooperation with the Golden Gate National Recreation Area)
- McNairn, Jack and Jerry MacMullen (1946) Ships of the Redwood Coast (Stanford: Stanford University Press) ISBN 0-8047-0386-8
- Newell, Gordon and Joe Williamson (1960) Pacific Lumber Ships (Seattle: Superior Publishing)
