= Lucia, California =

Lucia
- Unincorporated community
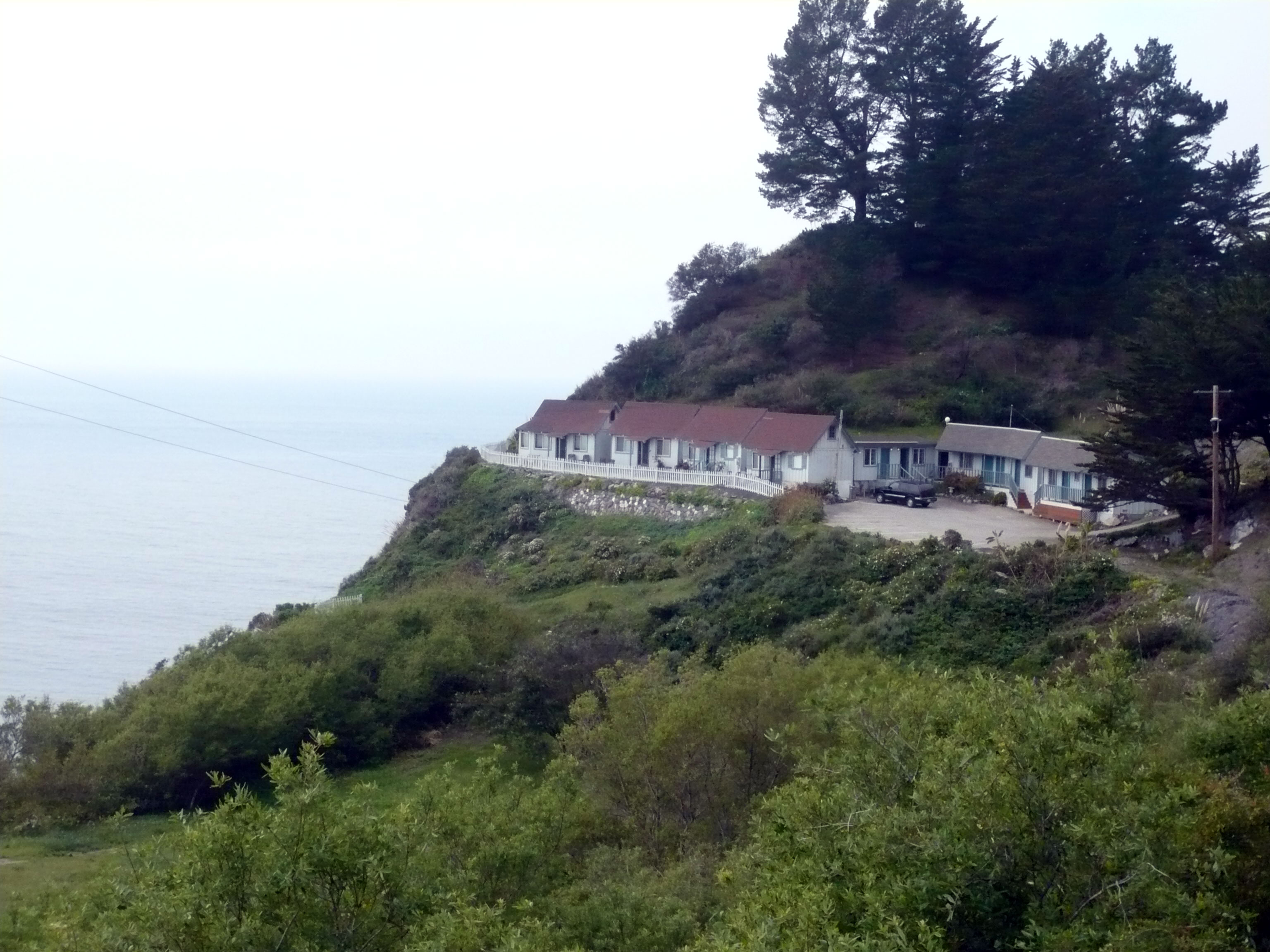
- View of Lucia Lodge in 2015

- Location in California Lucia (the United States)
- Coordinates: 36°1′14″N 121°33′4″W
- Country: United States
- State: California
- County: Monterey
- Established: 1885
- Elevation: 354 ft (108 m)

Lucia is a hamlet located 22 miles (35 km) south of Big Sur Village and 38 miles (61 km) north of Hearst Castle in Monterey County, California, United States. The area is sparsely settled.

The sole business active today is the Lucia Lodge alongside the Big Sur Coast Highway, one of very few lodging places along the south coast of Big Sur. Wilber Judson Harlan filed the first patent for land in the area in 1885; his family continue to own the Lodge. Until a fire in 2021, a small store and restaurant were attached to the Lodge. Lucia is miles away from any other business. Due to the remote location, gas prices are typically high.

== History ==
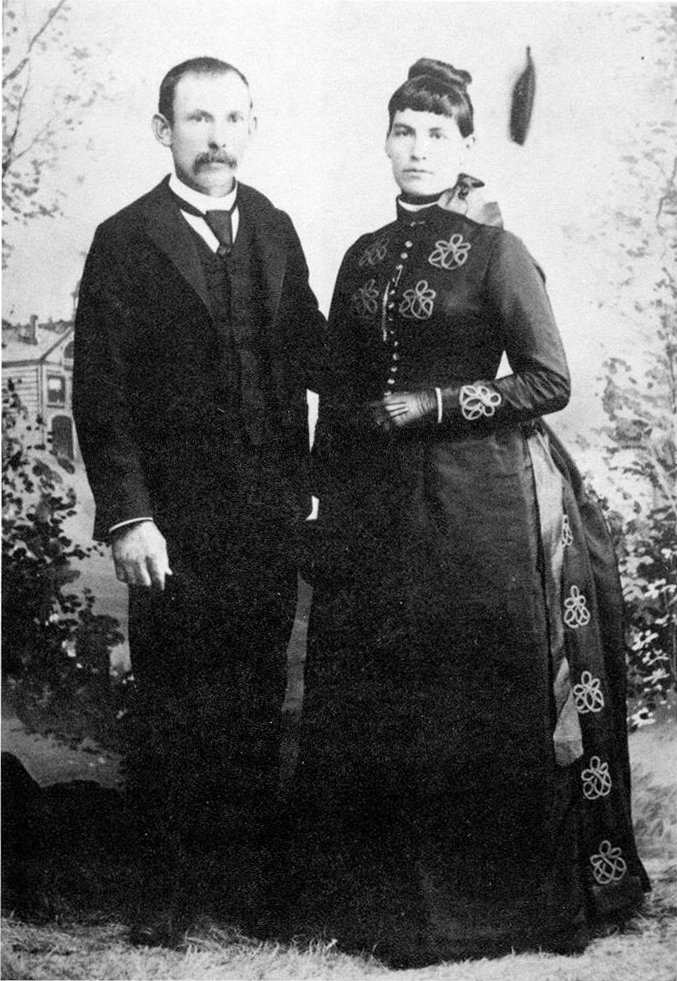
Wedding picture of Wilbur Judson Harlan and Ada Amanda Dani

=== Indigenous people ===
The land may have first been occupied the Salinan Playano subtribe who are believed to have lived as far north as Slates Hot Springs, easterly over the Santa Lucia Mountains and Junipero Serra Peak, inland towards Soledad and as far south as what is now San Simeon. The shell middens left behind indicate that indigenous people lived in the area in numbers along the coast. Their main diet during the summer consisted of fish and shell fish, evidenced by the fine particles of shell present in the soil for a depth of several feet in areas where the Indians camped. The Salinan named the peak Pimkolam. The tribe's name is taken from the Salinas River, as the tribe did not appear to have a name for themselves.

=== First homesteader ===
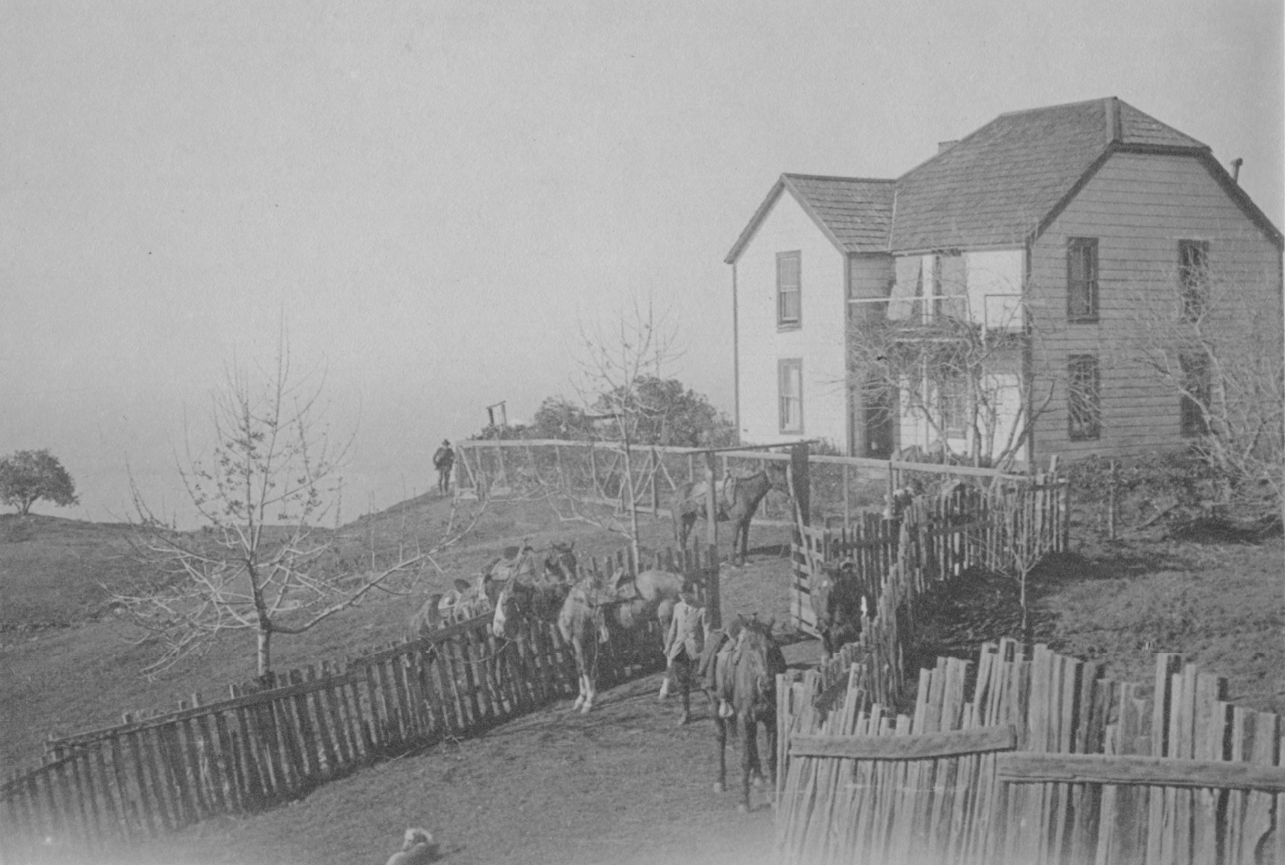
The Harlan home in Lucia, California was also the post office and a branch of county library. The home was built in 1901 and burned on December 12, 1926.

Wilber Judson Harlan was born on December 14, 1860, in Rushville, Rush, Indiana. His father died when he was 21, and Wilber moved to Santa Cruz, California where his half-sister Hester Ann lived with her husband C. J. Todd. He worked in a local nursery and on a threshing machine crew in the Salinas Valley. In 1885, Harlan homesteaded in Big Sur and filed his claim of 167 acres (68 ha) in the San Francisco Land Office.

Wilber Harlan grew up on a ranch owned by his parents George and Esther Harlan on Lopez Point, a mile north of Lucia. His future wife first arrived in the Big Sur area from San Jose in 1913 to become a school teacher at the Redwood School. George volunteered to meet the new teacher at the King City rail road station in the Salinas Valley. He brought her to the coast on a two-day horseback trip that included an overnight stay in Wagon Caves in the upper San Antonio River valley. They married and settled on the land.

=== Dani family ===
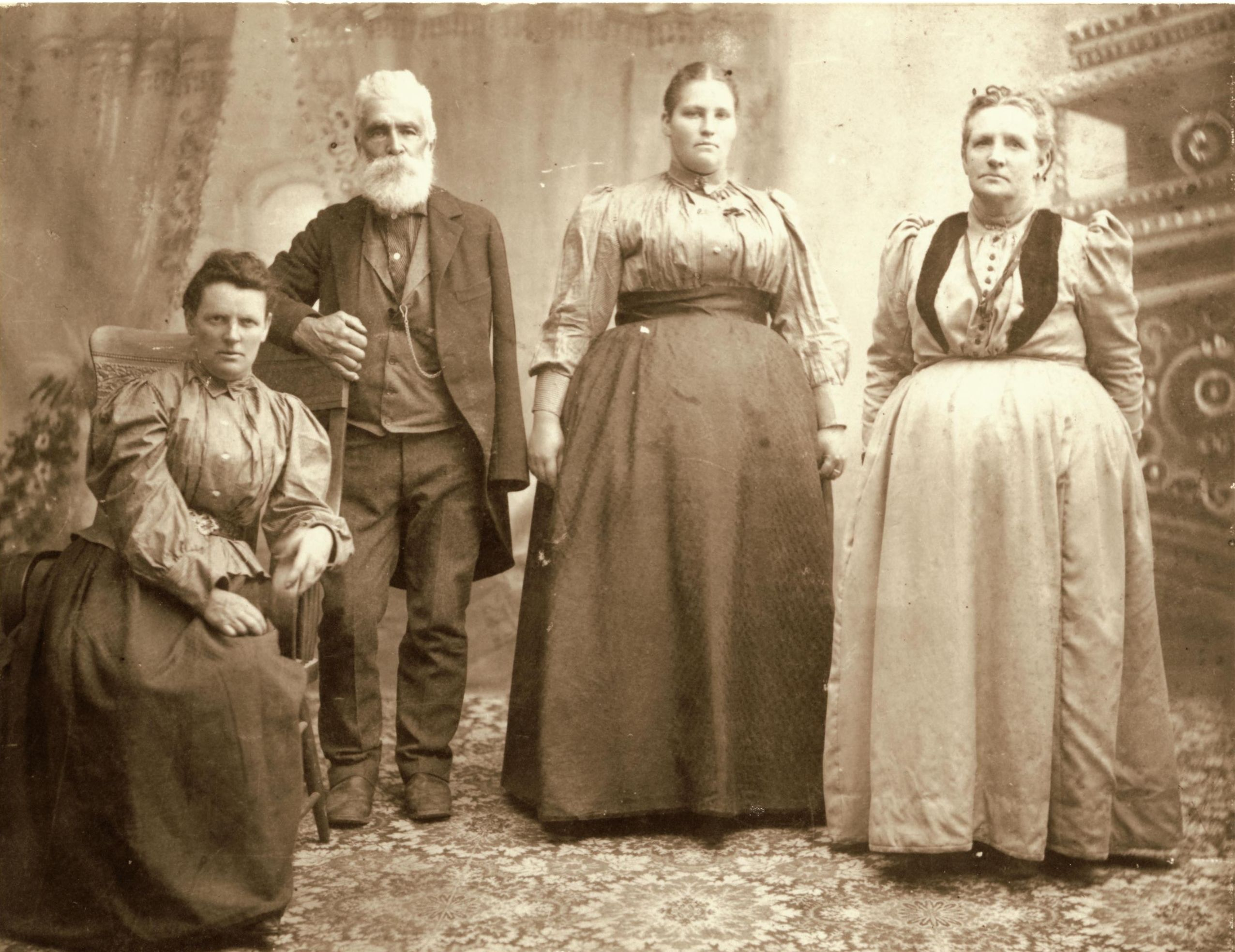
Dani Family. (L-R) daughter Mary Elizabeth, father Gabriel, daughter Lucia, and mother Elizabeth

Ada Amanda Dani married her neighbor Wilbur Harlan on July 7, 1889. They had 11 children. On March 8, 1900, the post office was opened in the home of Elizabeth and Gabriel Dani. While Lucia was postmaster, it served about 65 local residents.

In 1906, Ada became the second postmaster. She was succeeded by her daughter Lulu May Harlan who served until. George Harlan rode his horse Trixie to carry mail from Jolon to Lucia Post Office from 1922 to 1934.

The Harlan house burned down on December 12, 1926. The post office was closed in 1932. Soon after, the Dani house burned down. The Benedictine Order of Camaldolese monks acquired the Lucia Ranch property in 1958. The hermitage became known as the Immaculate Heart Hermitage.

=== Remote region ===
Due to the difficult terrain and lack of access, settlement of the Big Sur region was primarily concentrated in the north near the Big Sur River and in the south near Lucia. About two or three dozen individual homesteads dotted a 25 miles (40 km) stretch of coast between the two in the 1890s. The California coast south of Posts and north of San Simeon remained one of the most remote regions in the state, rivaling at the time nearly any other region in the United States for its difficult access.

Before the completion of the coast highway, Wagon Cave was used as a resting point and overnight camp site for those traveling to and from the coast. Travelers on horseback switched to wagons stored there for the purpose of transporting goods to market and provisions home. From the Caves there was a 18 miles (29 km) wagon road to Jolon. In 1878, Jolon had two grocers, a butcher, a blacksmith, a harness maker, a general merchandise store, post office, and Wells Fargo station. When the Southern Pacific Railroad was extended in 1886 to Soledad, travelers could then ride their wagons or a stage 37 miles (60 km) north. The families brought back supplies necessary to sustain their remote lives.

William Randolph Hearst developed an interest in acquiring more land to add to the ranch his father George Hearst had purchased, but Harlen refused to sell.

== Lucia Lodge ==
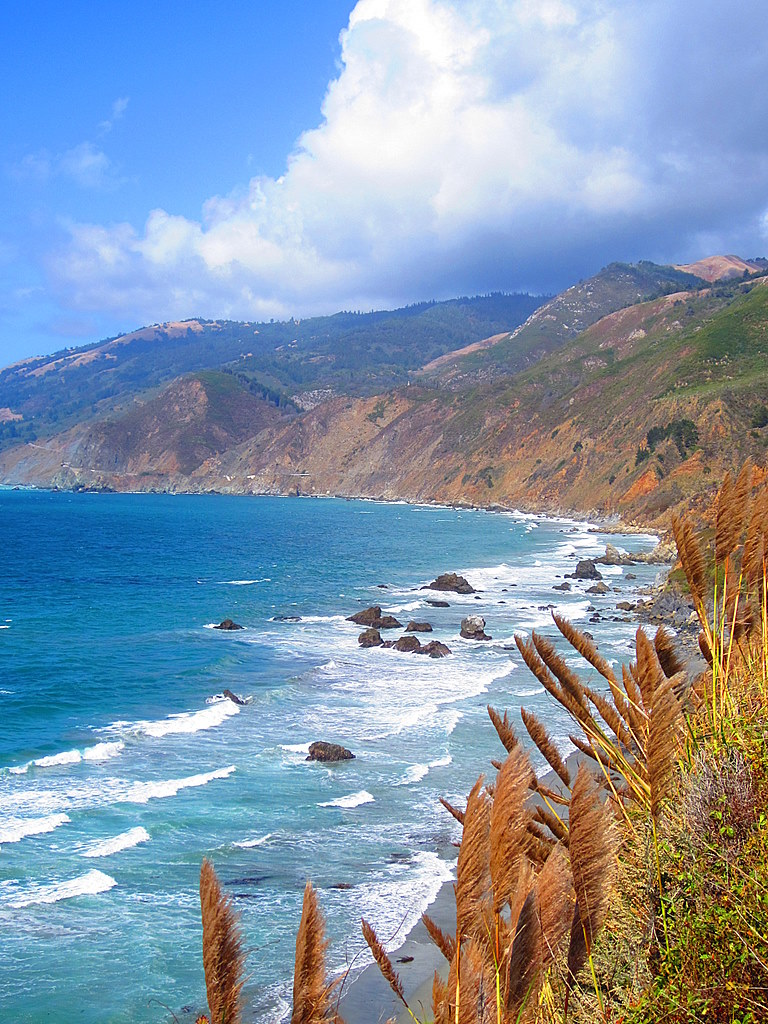
View from the Kirk Creek Campground near Lucia Lodge, 2007

The lodge was built in the 1930s by Forest Delamater who leased the land from Wilber Harlan. In 1936, the Lucia Post Office reopened at the newly constructed Lucia Lodge but subsequently closed again in 1938. In 1937, the Lucia store opened coinciding with the opening of Big Sur Coast Highway. Lucia also had a gas station as well.

The Lucia Lodge consists of ten cabins situated on a 300-foot cliff overlooking the Pacific Ocean. Fifth-generation Harlan descendants still operate the cabins. The Honeymoon Cabin (Unit 10) has exceptionally good views. The rooms do not have televisions or telephones. It is rumored that the lodge is haunted. Lucia Lodge included a general store and a restaurant facing the ocean that served lunch and dinner year round and breakfast only in the summer. The restaurant and store were destroyed by a fire in August 2021. The cabins located 100 yards north of the restaurant were not damaged. As of mid-2025, the cabins are being rented by highway construction workers.

== In popular culture ==
In the 2011 movie Take Me Home, the end is filmed on site at the lodge. In 2019, the Netflix series Ratched, a prequel to One Flew over the Cuckoo’s Nest, was filmed on site at the lodge. The lodge saw a spike in bookings following the release of the series.

== Additional reading ==
- Harlan, Stanley, My Mom and Dad on the south coast of Big Sur 2018 ISBN 9781729077528
