= Salinan =

Native people of Monterey County, California

Te'po'ta'ahl
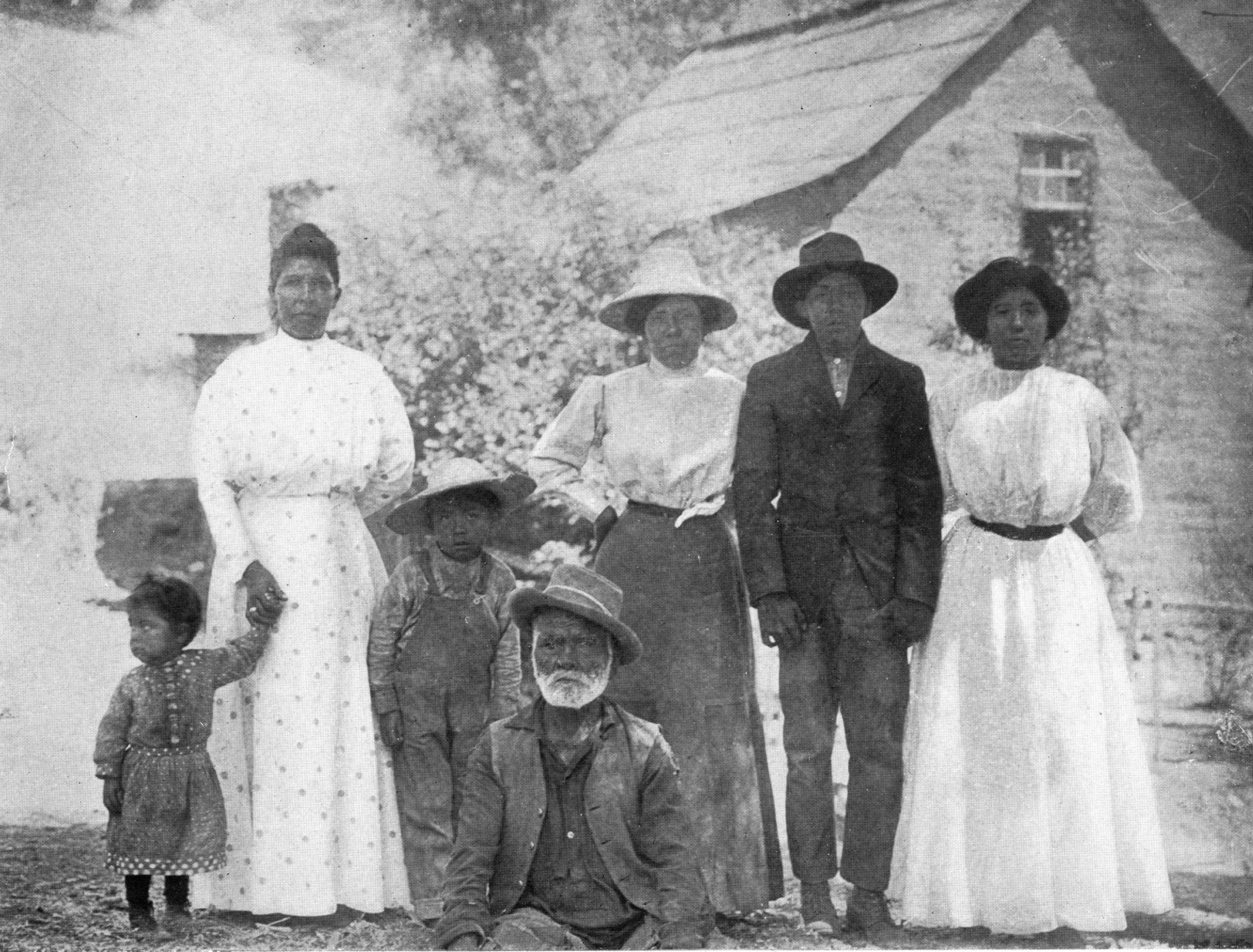
- Miguelino family near Mission San Antonio de Padua

Total population
- 681 (2000, census)

Regions with significant populations
- California

Languages
- English, formerly Salinan

Religion
- Salinan traditional narratives

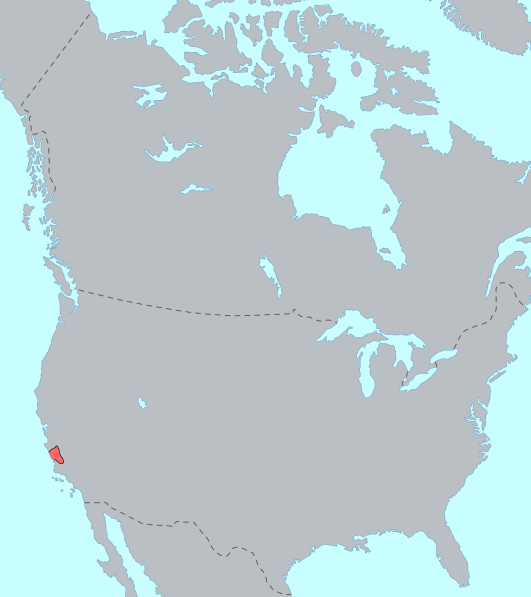
Precontact distribution of the Salinan.

The Salinan are an Indigenous people of California whose ancestral territory is in the southern Salinas Valley and the Santa Lucia Range in the Central Coast of California. Their Salinan language was a linguistic isolate.

== Geographic origins ==
Map of Salinan placenames, dialects, and bands

There were two major divisions and one subgroup. From north to south, the Antoniano lived in the lower part of the Salinas Valley (which flows south to north), near the future site of two missions: (Mission San Antonio de Padua and Mission San Miguel Arcángel). The Miguelino lived on the upper course of the Salinas River, and to the south near Slates Hot Springs, Junipero Serra Peak, and Soledad. There was also a Playano subgroup on the Pacific Coast in the vicinity of what is now Lucia and San Simeon. Salinans were Hunter-gatherers and, like most other California tribes, were organized in small groups with little centralized political structure.

They left shell middens behind, indicating that they lived in the area in numbers along the coast. Their main diet during the summer consisted of fish and shellfish, evidenced by the fine particles of shell present in the soil for a depth of several feet in areas where the Indians camped. The Salinan named the peak Pimkolam.

The 56 acres (23 ha) Wagon Caves rock formation about 18 miles (29 km) northwest of present-day Jolon is an archeological site that was used by the Salinan Antonianos subtribe who researchers believe occupied at least two villages in the area, an older site dating to approximately 450 AD and a later, protohistoric site with dates ranging from about 1450 to 1650 AD. Archeologists have found a stemmed biface, lithic flakes, shell beads, and non-human bones, as well as shell, bone, flaked stone, fire-affected rock, charred seeds, and mortars at the cave site. The rock overhangs and caves have fire-scarred roofs that bear evidence of occupancy over hundreds of years. The Wagon Cave Research Natural Area of 806 acres (326 ha) contains diverse stands of Valley Oaks of varying ages and densities and has been recommended as a Research Natural Area within the Los Padres National Forest.

== Name ==
The tribe's name is taken from the Salinas River, as the Spanish did not understand if the people had a name for themselves. The people's autonym translates as "People of the Oaks". C. Hart Merriam called these people the En-'ne-sen on advice from one informant; En-'ne-sen was the Native word for the Salinan headquarters. Merriam believes Salinan came from the name e'n-ne-sen.

== Language ==
The Salinan language is a language isolate. It may be a part of the Hokan language family. Sapir included it in a subfamily of Hokan, along with Chumash and Seri; this classification has found its way into more recent encyclopedias and presentations of language families, but serious supporting evidence has never been presented. Salinan was spoken until the 1950s.

== Population ==
Estimates for the precontact populations of most Native groups in California have varied substantially. Alfred L. Kroeber put the 1770 population of the Salinan as 3,000. Sherburne F. Cook similarly estimated that there were at least 700 Salinans. The 2000 United States census reported a total population of Salinan people as 681.

== Culture ==
Acorns were a go-to food for the tribe. They also ate a bunch of other plants like wild oats, sage and sunflower seeds, pine nuts, buckeye nuts, grapes, prickly pears, yucca root, and bulbs. Three different types of clover were eaten raw. The Salinan people gathered blackberries, strawberries, elderberries, gooseberries, toyon berries, and choke cherries.

== See also ==
- Salinan traditional narratives
- Kuksu (religion)
- Painted Rock (San Luis Obispo County)
- Chalon
- USS Salinan (ATF-161)
