= Sykes Camp =

Thermal springs camp

Sykes Campground
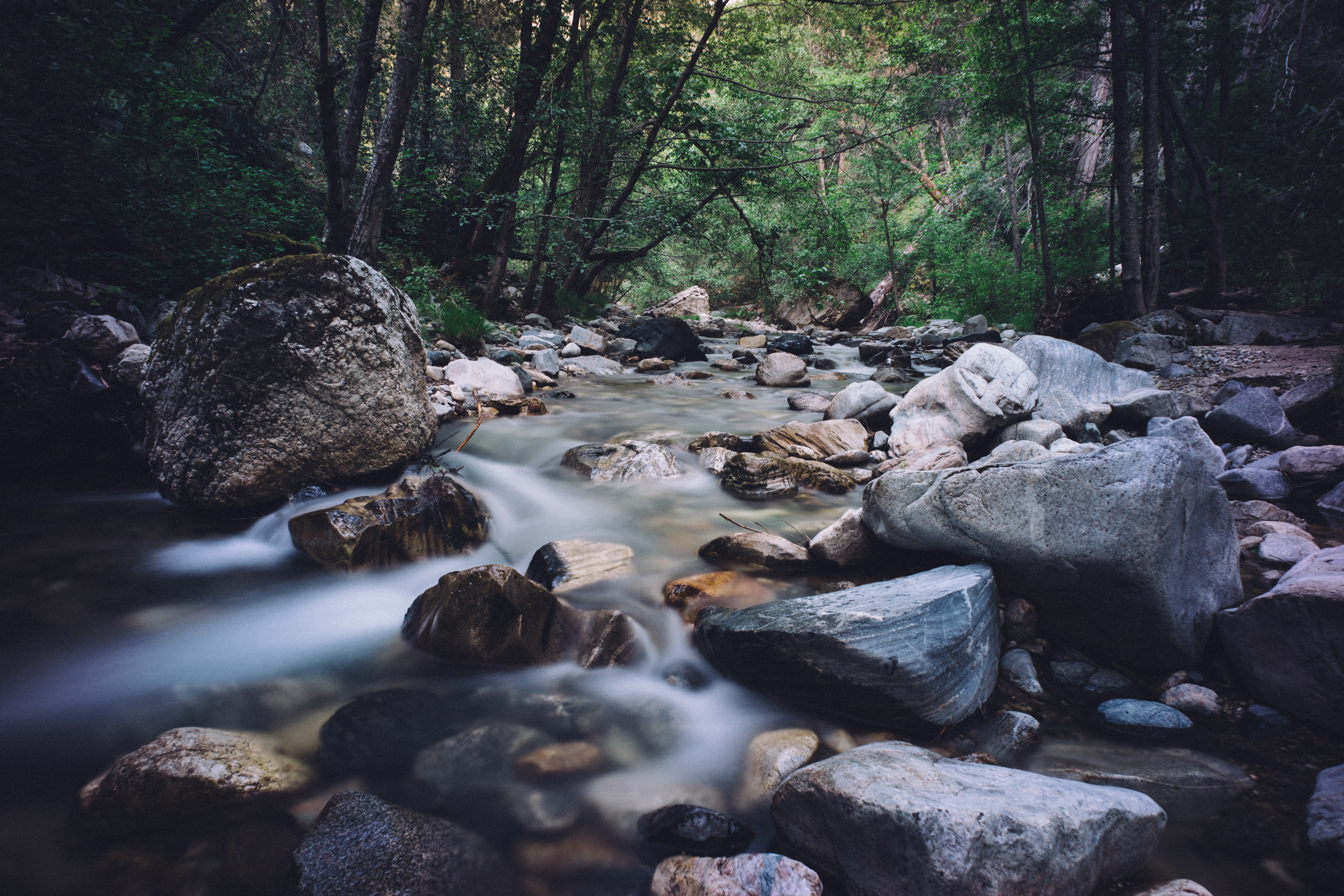
- Big Sur River at Sykes Hot Springs
- Interactive map of Sykes Campground
- Location: Ventana Wilderness, Big Sur, Monterey County, California
- Coordinates: 36.2485736°N 121.6855045°W
- Elevation: 1,080 feet (330 m)
- Type: Backcountry
- Land: Los Padres National Forest/Ventana Wilderness
- Campsites: 7
- Facilities: Fire rings, single box latrine
- Water: Big Sur River, purification required
- Fee: None
- Fires: During fire season, permit required
- Season: Year round (currently closed)
- Closed: As of March 2023

Sykes Camp is located 10 miles (16 km) from the Pfeiffer Big Sur State Park trailhead along the Pine Ridge Trail. There were seven campsites along both sides of the Big Sur River upstream and downstream from where the trail intersects the river. There was a pit toilet downstream of this intersection.

== Description ==
Sykes is accessible from the Pine Ridge Trail (Forest Trail No. E306), which is connected to the lower Terrace Creek (Forest Trail No. 3E22) and Ventana Camp (Forest Trail No. 2E14) trails. The and challenging 10 miles (16 km) (6-7 hour) hike from the coast requires climbing from the trailhead at 313 feet (95 m) to 1,575 feet (480 m) in about 4 miles (6.4 km). Before the camp was impacted by the heavy rains and resultant flooding (following the Soberanes Fire) during the 2017-18 winter, there were seven campsites along both sides of the Big Sur River, both upstream and downstream from where the trail intersects the river. There was a pit toilet downstream of this intersection.

== Sykes Hot Spring ==
There were before the closure in 2017 three small man-made rock and concrete impoundments that trapped the flow of a hot spring carved out of the southern hillside about .25 miles (0.40 km) downstream from where the trail intersects the river. The largest of the hot springs pools, adjacent to the river, was about 8 feet (2.4 m) across and about 2 feet (0.61 m) deep, suitable for about four adults. The temperature was 100 °F (38 °C) depending on rain. According to the Forest Service, the man-made tubs were illegal impoundments that are inconsistent with the intention of a wilderness experience. The U.S. Forest Service proposed asking rangers or volunteers to remove, and discouraging visitors from rebuilding, the containment structures when they wash out after winter rains.

The hot tubs were characterized by the Ventana Wilderness Alliance as "an attractive nuisance" that required an undue amount of time and attention of the U.S. Forest Service and volunteers due to ongoing needs for visitor education, overuse, fire restriction enforcement, and the chronic need to clean-up after careless visitors and pack out hundreds of pounds of trash and abandoned gear.

The pools were wiped out by heavy rains during the 2017-18 winter. In January 2020, the Forest Service stated that it would not allow the hot spring impoundments to be rebuilt. "The hot tubs are not going to be allowed back," Forest Service spokesperson Lynn Olson stated. The artificial structures violate wilderness ethics and laws that do not permit man-made structures.

== Overuse issues ==
Sykes Camp is within the Ventana Wilderness and alongside the protected Big Sur River. The challenging trail to the camp from the coast has been littered with abandoned backpacks and tents, bras, jackets, food wrappers, water bottles, and toilet paper. The campsite and hot springs were at times very crowded, especially on holidays and weekends. Over 200 people have been counted camping near the river, although there are only seven officially designated campsites and a single pit toilet designed to support 20 visitors. Some visitors reported that unburied human feces were readily visible.

Many visitors to Sykes are unaware that unlike state parks, the wilderness camp site does not provide garbage service. Unprepared for the difficult hike, they abandon trash and gear at Sykes, which encourages others to do the same. Richard Popchak of the Ventana Wilderness Alliance reported that, "The U.S. Forest Service is woefully underfunded and understaffed. In the Monterey Ranger District, they have not employed a Wilderness Ranger since the 1980s."

== Closures ==
The Los Padres Forest and Ventana Wilderness around Sykes Camp were closed as a result of the Soberanes Fire in June 2017. During a heavy winter storm in 2016–2017, the Pine Ridge Trail to Sykes Camp was severely damaged and completely destroyed in several places. The man-made improvements that captured the hot springs in pools were removed by the high-flowing river. As of August 2018, the trail was blocked by multiple washouts along creeks and dozens of fallen trees across the path. Reopening the trail requires an environmental assessment and perhaps re-routing the trail. The trail was closed indefinitely. Entering the closed areas could result in a penalty of $5,000 and/or six months in jail.

In January, 2020, the Forest Service announced that trail crews were restoring and partially rerouting the Pine Ridge Trail. As of December 2020, the trail and adjoining campsites were closed. In March 2023, most of the trail was open except for the section of trail from Ventana Camp to Terrace Creek was closed.

== History ==
The area was populated before the arrival of European settlers by the Esselen people, and their use of the springs is unknown. Carbon dating tests of artifacts found near Slates Hot Springs in the southern Big Sur region indicate human presence as early as 3500 BC.
