= Ventana Wilderness Alliance =

- Ventana Wilderness Alliance
- Company type: Non-profit
- Founded: 1998
- Headquarters: Monterey, California, United States
- Area served: Central Coast, California
- Key people: Mike Chamberlain (Executive Director)
- Number of employees: 5 full time

The Ventana Wilderness Alliance, founded in 1998, is a 501 c 3 nonprofit organization dedicated to protecting California's Big Sur backcountry. Its mission is to protect, preserve, and restore the wilderness qualities and biodiversity of the public lands within California's Northern Santa Lucia Mountains and Big Sur region.

== History ==
At their founding, they conducted an inventory of public lands within the Los Padres National Forest Monterey Ranger District. Their goal was to assess the suitability of land in the region for inclusion in federal wilderness. Their findings persuaded US Congressman Sam Farr to sponsor the Big Sur Wilderness and Conservation Act. On December 19, 2002, the Big Sur Wilderness and Conservation Act of 2002 added 33,967 acres (13,746 ha) to the existing wilderness bringing it to a total of 240,026 acres (97,135 ha).

Following its initial organization, it focused on retiring inappropriate grazing allotments, mitigating abandoned mine sites, and cleaning up clandestine cannabis grow sites.

The Alliance sued the Monterey Ranger District and the U.S. Forest Service, challenging their decision to permit grazing on public land within the wilderness. The Wilderness Act prohibits commercial enterprises on public land designated as wilderness, but permits grazing when the usage predates establishment of the wilderness. In this case grazing had occurred for over 115 years when the land was privately owned. There was a temporary cessation during which the Forest Service conducted an environmental assessment. The court ruled that the temporary cessation during the transition from private to public land was not sufficient to end the grazing usage and did not discontinue the use. The grazing had been "established" for purposes of the Wilderness Act, and the Alliance lost the suit and an appeal on February 26, 2009.

== Service projects ==
=== Wilderness rangers ===
As of 2015, over 80% of the Monterey Ranger District of Los Padres National Forest is protected by the Ventana Wilderness and Silver Peak areas. The Alliance strives to encourage government management of the wilderness lands. There were five full-time Monterey District rangers in the late 1970s, and due to severe budget restrictions and staffing shortages, As of May 2020 there are none. The Monterey Ranger District relies almost entirely on volunteers to maintain trails, clean up trash, and teach visitors to responsibly enjoy the wilderness.

=== Trail crew ===
The Alliance recruits individuals to join its Trail Crew program and to act as voluntary Wilderness Rangers who patrol the backcountry. The Alliance began the volunteer Wilderness Ranger program in 2011. It matched about $60,000 in funding it received as a grant from the National Forest Foundation to train volunteers and give them tools, supplies, and travel stipends. The Forest Service provides uniforms, training facilities, and radios. The rangers educate back-country visitors in Leave No Trace principles and to clean up camps, especially at high-use areas like Sykes Hot Springs. Sykes Camp was heavily impacted by overuse for many years, but has been closed since the Soberanes Fire in June 2017 severely damaged the Pine Ridge Trail. Winter storms the following winter reportedly wiped out the man-made impoundments at the spring as well. The Alliance also conducts a Youth in Wilderness program to encourage the younger generation to enjoy the wilderness and take an active role to protect it.

Among the projects the Alliance has funded was reconstructing trails in the Silver Peak Wilderness and in the Tassajara area. They also funded reconstruction of the South Fork Trail on the south fork of the Big Sur River. That trail had become impassible from lack of maintenance. The hired a crew from American Conservation Experience who restored 3.5 miles (5.6 km) of trail, removing 72 trees across the trail in the process. Volunteers completed the rest of the trail work, re-establishing a trail the traversed the wilderness from east to west. They hired a crew from AmeriCorps NCCC to repair 1.5 miles (2.4 km) on the popular Kirk Creek Trail, which connects Highway 1 to Vicente Flat camp.

=== Film festival ===
The Alliance sponsors the Wild and Scenic Film Festival held each year in Santa Cruz.
