= Big Sur Village, California =

Unincorporated community in California, United States

Big Sur Village
- Unincorporated community
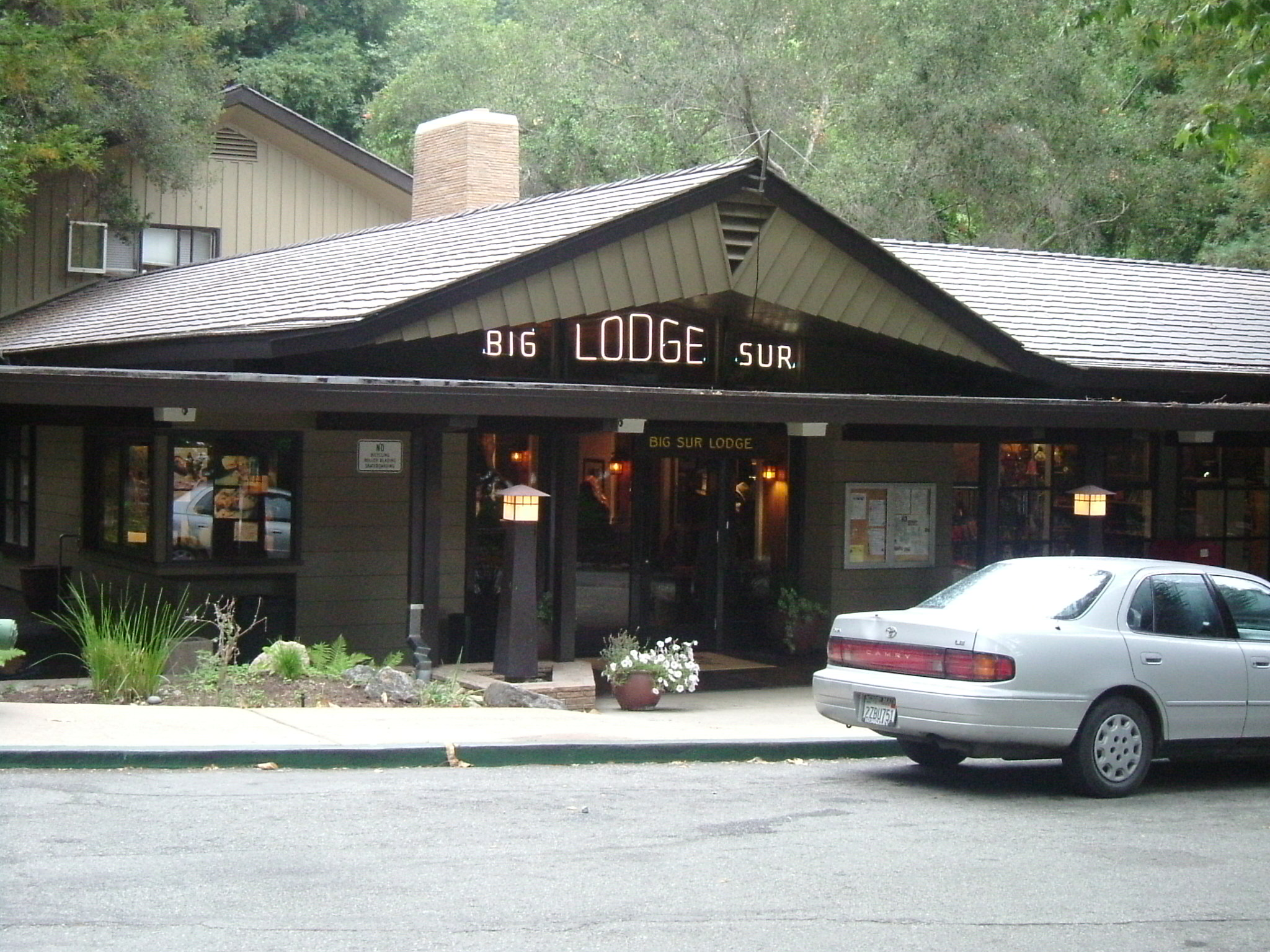
- Big Sur Lodge

- Location in California
- Coordinates: 36°16′13″N 121°48′27″W
- Country: United States
- State: California
- County: Monterey
- Founded: 1889 (establishment of post office)
- Elevation: 135 ft (41 m)
- ZIP code: 93920
- FIPS code: 06-44427
- GNIS feature ID: 269849

Big Sur Village is an unincorporated community in the Big Sur region, in Monterey County, California, United States. It is located along a 1-mile-long (1.6 km) stretch of Big Sur Coast Highway in the Big Sur Valley 24 miles (39 km) south of Carmel. The village contains the largest collection of shops and visitor services along the entire 71-mile (114 km) segment of California State Route 1 between Malpaso Creek near Carmel Highlands in the north and San Carpóforo Creek near San Simeon in the south. The population of the entire coastal region is about 1,463. The collection of small roadside businesses and homes is often confused with the larger region, also known as Big Sur. On March 6, 1915, United States Post Office granted the English-speaking residents' request to change the name of their post office from Arbolado to Big Sur. Caltrans also refers to the village as Big Sur.

== Services ==
Services along about 1 mile (1.6 km) of the highway include a post office, the Big Sur Bakery, the Big Sur Lodge with 62 rooms, cafe, a bar and grill, a gallery, a pub and restaurant, yoga studio, artists studios, the Big Sur Grange Hall, a few apartments, one of three gas stations along the coast, and a visitor center with tourist information at Big Sur Station, the western terminus of the Pine Ridge Trail.

== Transportation ==
Until about 1924, a rough dirt road that was often impassible in winter connected residents with Carmel and Monterey to the north. The road extended south 2.5 miles (4.0 km) to Posts and Castro Canyon, ending near the present-day location of Deetjen's Big Sur Inn. The 30-mile (48 km) trip from Carmel could take three days by wagon or stagecoach. The state began constructing a paved two-lane road in 1924. When completed on June 17, 1937, it was initially named the Roosevelt Highway.

Public transportation is available to and from Monterey on Monterey–Salinas Transit. The summer schedule operates from Memorial Day to Labor Day three times a day, while the winter schedule only offers bus service on weekends. Service can be interrupted by high winds and severe weather. There is a single shuttle van that operates during the summer on Thursday through Sunday from the Big Sur Station to Pfeiffer Beach.

== Etymology ==
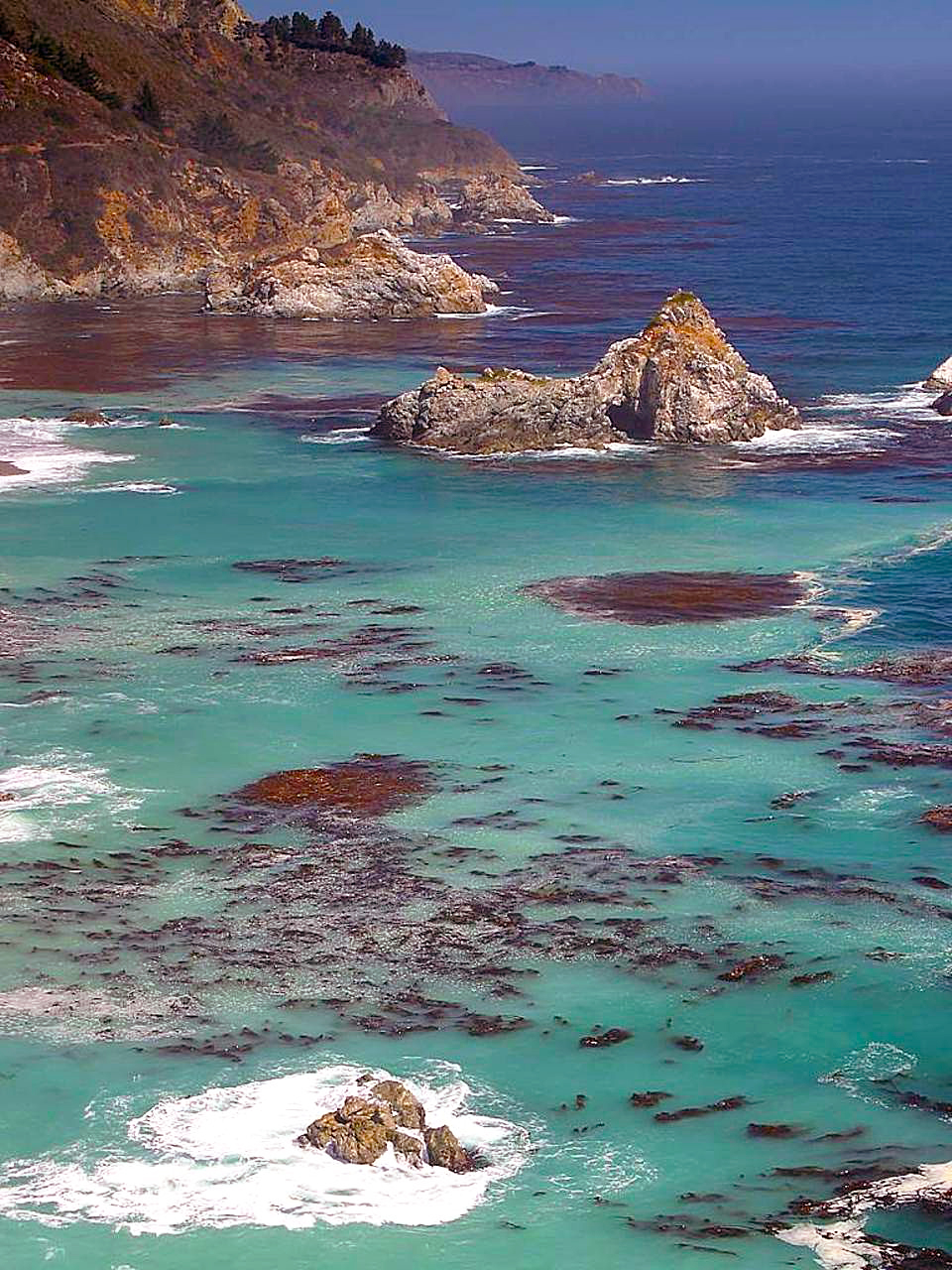
Big Sur: rocky coast, fog and giant kelp

The name "Big Sur" has its origins in the area's early Spanish history. While the Portolá expedition was exploring Alta California, they arrived at San Carpóforo Canyon near present-day San Simeon on September 13, 1769. Unable to penetrate the difficult terrain along the coast, they detoured inland through the San Antonio and Salinas Valleys before arriving at Monterey Bay, where they founded Monterey and named it the provincial capital.

The Spanish referred to the vast and relatively unexplored coastal region to the south of Monterey as el país grande del sur, meaning "the big country of the south". This was often shortened to el sur grande (the big south). The two major rivers draining this portion of the coast were named El Rio Grande del Sur and El Rio Chiquito del Sur.

The first recorded use of the name "el Sud" (meaning "the South") was on a map of the Rancho El Sur land grant given by Governor José Figueroa to Juan Bautista Alvarado on July 30, 1834.

== Post office ==
Big Sur's first post office, named "Posts", was in the home of W.B. Post.

The homesteaders changed the name of their post office to Arbolado (Spanish for woodland) but that was confused by the post office for Alvarado, a street in Monterey. The post office operated at Posts from 1889 to 1910. The residents then petitioned the United States Post Office in Washington, D.C., to change the post office name to Big Sur, and the rubber stamp using that name was returned on March 6, 1915, cementing the name in place. The ZIP Code is 93920. The community is inside area code 831.

== History ==
Archaeological evidence shows that the Esselen lived in Big Sur as early as 3500 BC, leading a nomadic, hunter-gatherer existence. Beginning in about 1771, the Native Americans were forcibly relocated and conscripted as laborers at the Carmel Mission, where their way of life were lost to them, and their population was decimated by disease, starvation, overwork, and torture.

The first known European settler in Big Sur was George Davis, who in 1853 claimed a tract of land along the Big Sur River. He built a cabin near the present day site of the beginning of the Mount Manuel Trail. In 1868, Native Americans Manual and Florence Innocenti bought Davis' cabin and land for $50. In the winter of 1869, Michael and Barbara Laquet Pfeiffer were on their way to the south coast of Big Sur when they were forced to stop for the season in the Sycamore Canyon area near present-day Big Sur Village. They liked the area so much they decided against moving south again the following spring. They brought four children with them: Charles, John, Mary Ellen, and Julia. They later had four more: William, Frank, Flora, and Adelaide. After the Homestead Act of 1862 was passed by Congress, he filed for patents on his land in 1883 and 1889. The family supported themselves by ranching and beekeeping.

The Pfeiffer's son John Martin Pfeiffer and his wife Zulema Florence Swetnam built a cabin near the north bank of the Big Sur River in 1884. Another of the oldest establishments along the coast is the Big Sur River Inn and Restaurant founded in 1934.

In August 1972, the Molera Fire burned the hills above Big Sur. The slopes above the village rise abruptly from around 135 feet (41 m) to more than 3,500 feet (1,100 m). Slopes angle from 25 to 90 degrees. During the following winter, four tributaries of the Big Sur River were struck with so much rain that on November 18, 1972, a mudflow deposited several feet of mud around the Post Office and a few other nearby buildings.

== Government ==
At the county level, Big Sur Village is represented on the Monterey County Board of Supervisors by Mary Adams. In the California State Legislature, Big Sur Village is in the 17th senatorial district, represented by Democrat John Laird, and in the 30th Assembly district, represented by Democrat Dawn Addis. In the United States House of Representatives, the Village is in California's 20th congressional district, represented by Republican Vince Fong
