= Posts, California =

Unincorporated community in California, United States

Posts
- Unincorporated community
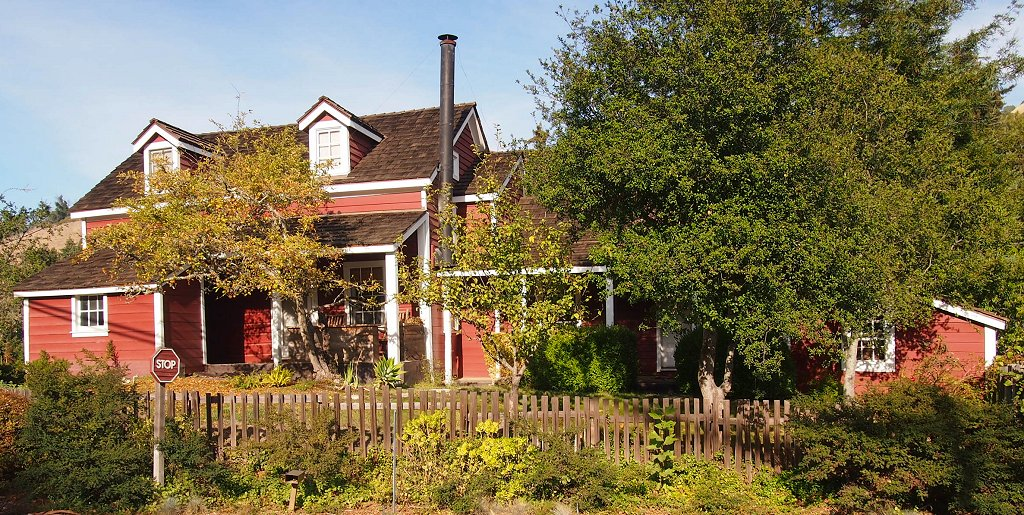
- The Post Ranch Inn in 2013

- Location in California Posts (the United States)
- Coordinates: 36°13′42″N 121°45′52″W
- Country: United States
- State: California
- County: Monterey
- Elevation: 945 ft (288 m)

Posts (formerly Posts Summit) is an unincorporated community in the Big Sur region of Monterey County, California, United States. It is located on the Big Sur Coast Highway, 4.8 miles (7.7 km) south of the Big Sur Village at an elevation of 945 feet (288 m).

== History ==
=== Post family ===
After returning to the Monterey area, William Brainard (W.B.) Post found work in upper Carmel Valley at the ranch of James Meadows. Meadows had married Loretta Onesimo, one of the last native speakers of the Rumsen language. Post met Loretta's sister Anselma, and they were married in 1850. Post earned a reputation as a skilled bear and deer hunter in the Big Sur region and he traded in hides and buckskin. This work drew him north to the Elkhorn Slough on Monterey Bay where Capt. Charles Moss was establishing a landing and wharf to handle the emerging grain trade in the Salinas Valley in the early 1860s. Post opened one of the first grain warehouses along the coast at Moss Landing. Flat bottom boats brought grain from all over the Salinas Valley to the Slough and unloaded at Post’s warehouse. Post was as agent for the steamship company of Goodall, Nelson and Perkins. The success of the shipping point stimulated the growth of Castroville, one of Monterey County's first municipalities, which served to support Moss Landing commerce.

Post then built the first butcher shop in Castroville in 1870, where their two daughters Mary and Ellen were born.

=== Big Sur home ===
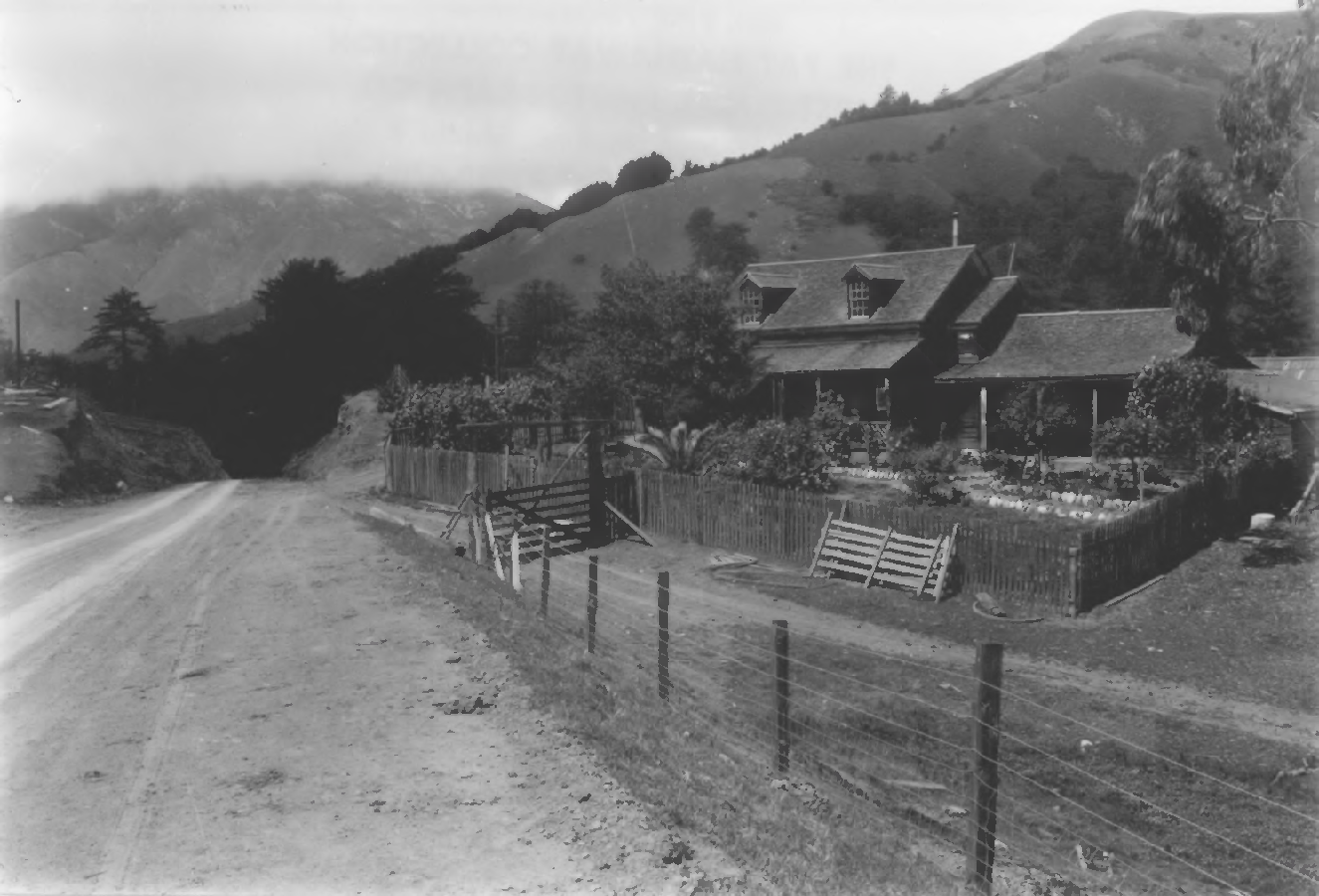
Post homestead on Highway 1 circa 1930

The family moved to the Soberanes Ranch in Big Sur, where Post was foreman. Ezequiel Soberanes operated a prosperous cattle and sheep ranch for 24 years in the area now known as Garrapata State Park. The Soberanes family, locally famed for their musical talents, offered their hospitality to other ranchers traveling along the coast to Monterey.

Post raised cattle, hogs, and apples on the land and sold his products to stores in Monterey County. He also sold tanbark to George and William Notley. The tanbark was harvested from the isolated trees inland, corded, brought out by mule back or using wooden sleds, and loaded by cable onto waiting vessels anchored offshore at Notley's Landing. The bark was used to manufacture tannic acid, necessary to the growing leather tanning industry located in Santa Cruz, across the bay from Monterey.

=== Limited access ===
The trail was gradually improved into a road and Monterey County declared the Old Coast Road a public road in 1885. In 1886 Charles Bixby, who owned land 15 miles (24 km) to the north of the Post Ranch, improved the road between his ranch and Monterey, and Post extended it further south to his ranch. A son, Joseph William Post, was born on the ranch. In 1888, Joseph Post won a government contract to build a road to connect the road his father built and Point Sur, the future site of the Point Sur Lighthouse.

In 1920, the 26 mi (42 km) trip from Carmel in a light spring wagon pulled by two horses could be completed in about 11 hours. A lumber wagon pulled by four horses could make the trip in 13 hours. The road was impassable for most of each winter. Dr. John L. Roberts first proposed improving the wagon road into a highway in 1915.

The southern region of Monterey County coast was isolated from the few settlements in the north by the steep and rugged terrain. To the south of Posts, there was no road beyond the Pfeiffer Resort and Ranch, only a foot and horseback trail. During the 18th century, the trail began at the Post Ranch and climbed inland to the crest of the coastal ridge. To avoid the steep canyons along the coast, the trail followed the coastal ridge over Anderson Peak and Cone Peak to locations in the south, including homesteads at Slates Hot Springs and the mining town of Manchester in Pacific Valley near what is now known as Gorda.

=== First post office ===
Big Sur’s first post office, named "Posts", was in their house. Confusion ensued when mail intended for the Presidio was sent to Big Sur, and mail for the military post was sent to the local residents. The residents changed the name of the post office to Arbolado (Spanish: 'woodland'), but that was confused by the post office for Alvarado, a street in Monterey. The post office operated at Posts from 1889 to 1910; it was moved in 1905 several miles northwest to the Pfeiffer Ranch Resort in what later became the Big Sur Village. Finally, the English-speaking homesteaders petitioned the United States Post Office in Washington, D.C., to change the name of their post office from Arbolado to Big Sur, and the rubber stamp using that name was returned on March 6, 1915, cementing the use of Big Sur as the place name.

John Steinbeck was one of the ranch's hired hands in 1920. He wrote a letter to the Post family thanking them for stagecoach fare back to Salinas. The letter is preserved at the inn as one of the earliest samples of his writing.

The Post Ranch was once much larger. To avoid foreclosure, W.B. Post sold part of the ranch west of the Old Coast Road to Russell Fields in 1926. This later became known as Ventana and Coastlands. Long-time Big Sur resident and contractor Sam Trotter built a home there in 1938, at 14 Upper Coastlands.

Billy Post (born Joseph William Post III on August 24, 1920) drove cattle as a young man from the ranch to the rail road in Monterey. The trip took three days. Billy went to school to become a veterinarian, but college was interrupted by World War II. He joined the Marine Corps and served in the Pacific. He returned home to run the ranch. Bill married Lynette Hettich on February 12, 1955, and they had two girls, Gayle and Rebecca. When he divorced, he raised the two daughters on his own. Billy worked for Caltrans as a highway electrician for many years. In 1969 he married Luci Lee, a business woman with two daughters.

== Post Ranch house ==
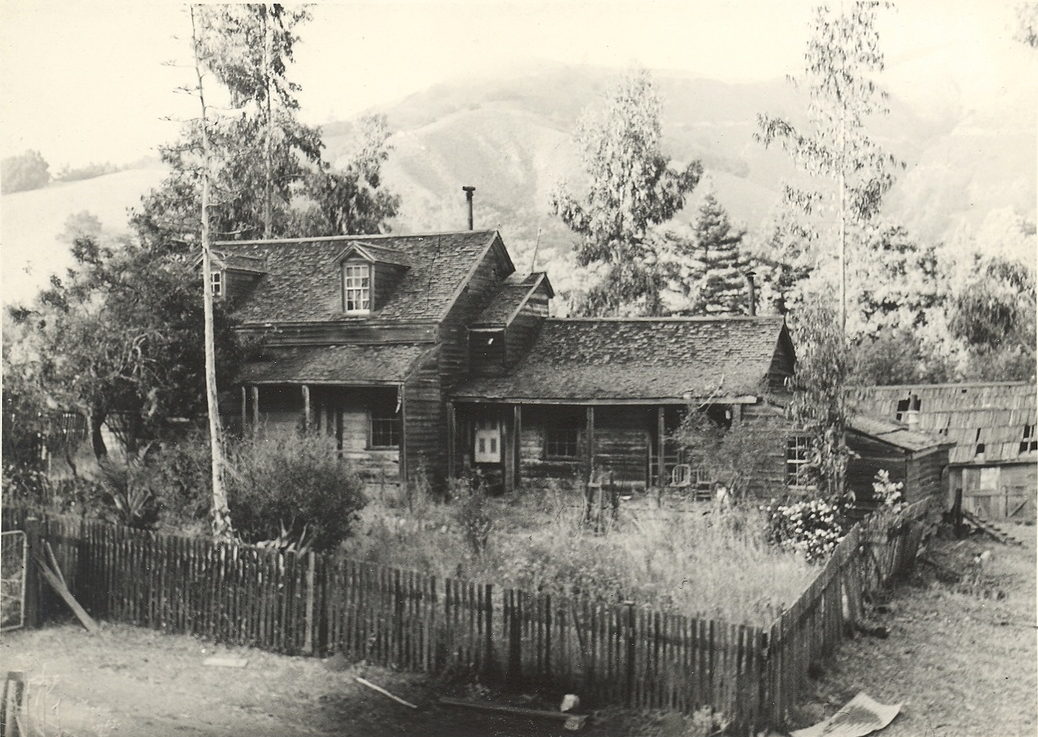
Post Ranch house in 1920. The original cabin is on the right.

The original one story, single room Joseph W. Post House was built in 1867 by W.B. Post at the crown of what was later named Post Grade. It was built using single-wall construction, using two layers of 1 inch (25 mm) thick redwood planks, with an outside horizontal layer and inside vertical layer.

The home site is 2 miles (3.2 km) uphill from the Big Sur River. It was built from native redwood, harvested locally, hand-split, and planed on site. Its style reflects the family patriarch's Connecticut origins in a traditional Saltbox form. There was a roofed shed on the south-east for sleeping.

Over time succeeding generations of the Post family expanded the home and made improvements. Joseph W. Post added a two-story wing to the north side of the house in 1877. The house is irregularly shaped and built upon a simple mud sill foundation. It is capped by a series of low and steep pitched gable and shed roofs covered with wood shingle. There were open porches covered by roofs and supported by vertical wood posts on both sides of the building.

The Big Sur Coast Highway was built in front of the house in 1922, necessitating destruction of the original barn and fencing to the north. The home is on the National Register of Historic Places.

The building was abandoned for several years before the Gomez family used it for employee housing, It continued as employee housing for 20 years. While still known as the Post House, the building on Highway 1 was sold by Billy Post on January 11, 1972, along with 200 acres (81 ha). The Big Sur Ventana Corporation built the Ventana Big Sur Resort and the red New England–style house became a cafe.

== Government ==
At the county level, Posts is represented on the Monterey County Board of Supervisors by Mary Adams. In the California State Legislature, Posts is in the 17th senatorial district, represented by Democrat John Laird, and in the 30th Assembly district, represented by Democrat Dawn Addis. In the United States House of Representatives, Posts is in California's 20th congressional district, represented by Republican Vince Fong

== See also ==
- Big Sur
- Pfeiffer Big Sur State Park
