= Francis Doud =

American pioneer

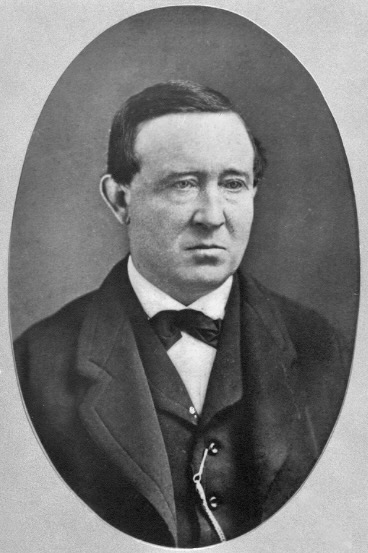
- Francis Doud (1820–1910)
- Born: January 20, 1820; Castlebar, Ireland
- Died: 3 December 1910 (aged 90); Monterey, California, US
- Occupations: California pioneer, soldier, builder
- Spouse: Ann Kelleher
- Children: 6
- Military career
- Allegiance: United States of America
- Branch: United States Army
- Service years: 1835–1847
- Unit: 2nd Regiment
- Conflict: Seminole Wars 1835–1842); Mexican–American War 1843–1847; Battle of Cerro Gordo; Siege of Veracruz
- Awards: Bronze medal (1847)

Francis Doud (January 20, 1820 – December 3, 1910) was a California pioneer of 1849, a veteran soldier of the Mexican–American War, who enlisted in the army "to fight the Indians". He established the Doud House in ca. 1852, and acquired 5,000 acres (2,000 ha) along the seacoast south of Monterey, California, in 1891 to create the Doud Ranch. He was known as a "prominent capitalist".

== Early life ==
Doud was born on January 20, 1820, in the town of Castlebar, Ireland. His parents were James Doud and Winifred Churchill. Doud left his homeland at age sixteen (1935) and emigrated to New York City, where he briefly visited relatives.

He married Ann Kelleher (1821–1896) of Ireland on Lockport, New York, on September 14, 1845. They had six children: Frank, Nellie, Mary, Thomas, Martin and Edward.

== Military career ==
In 1838, Doud enlisted in the United States Army with the mission to fight the Native American peoples. He served in the Seminole Wars (1835–42) in Florida for four years under General Bennet C. Riley. Doud then served 2nd Regiment in the Mexican–American War again under General Riley. Wounded during the Siege of Veracruz, a key Mexican beachhead seaport of Veracruz, and later at Battle of Cerro Gordo, these injuries ultimately led to his honorable discharge in 1847. His achievements were recognized through a bronze medal crafted from the metal of brass fieldpieces used in the battles at Veracruz. The Mexican Veteran Association issued the medal, bearing the year of 1847. His wife was with him during the time of the Mexican War.

As the Mexican War drew to a close and the United States Army took control of Monterey, Doud left New York on January 26, 1849, and traveled with his wife, Anna, and their son Francis Jr., six months aboard the steamer Orpheus. They arrived in San Francisco on July 8, 1849, and then moved to Monterey, California in 1850. Doud was the custodian of government property at the Presidio of Monterey.

During the first California Constitutional Convention held at Colton Hall in Monterey from August 10 to September 30, 1849, Doud took on the responsibilities of both orderly and messenger.

== Private life ==
In Monterey, he built the first butcher shop with lumber imported from the Horn of Africa. He operated a meat market within the town.

During the California Gold Rush, Doud looked for gold the mines in Mariposa, California. By June 1850, he had returned to Monterey, where he purchased real estate from the former Mexican War officer, Major Edward S. Canby, for $400 (equivalent to $15,480 in 2025).

On February 26, 1873, Doud became a member of the Society of California Pioneers. He was a member of the Monterey Chamber of Commerce. Around 1910, he gave the organization $50 (equivalent to $1,728 in 2025).

During the 1850s, Doud constructed the larger Doud House, on his property at 117 Van Buren Street. The Doud House, designed in the New England Vernacular-style, is a single-story rectangular home. Its façade includes an open veranda that spanning the width of the white clapboard structure. Double sash windows are hung with ornamental shutters. Access to the veranda is granted via a set of straight double stairs with a picket railing. The building has a gabled roof composed of composition shingles, and a picket fence encloses the property. In 1976, an additional 8 square feet (0.74 m^{2}) of floor space was incorporated.

=== Rancho San José y Sur Chiquito ===
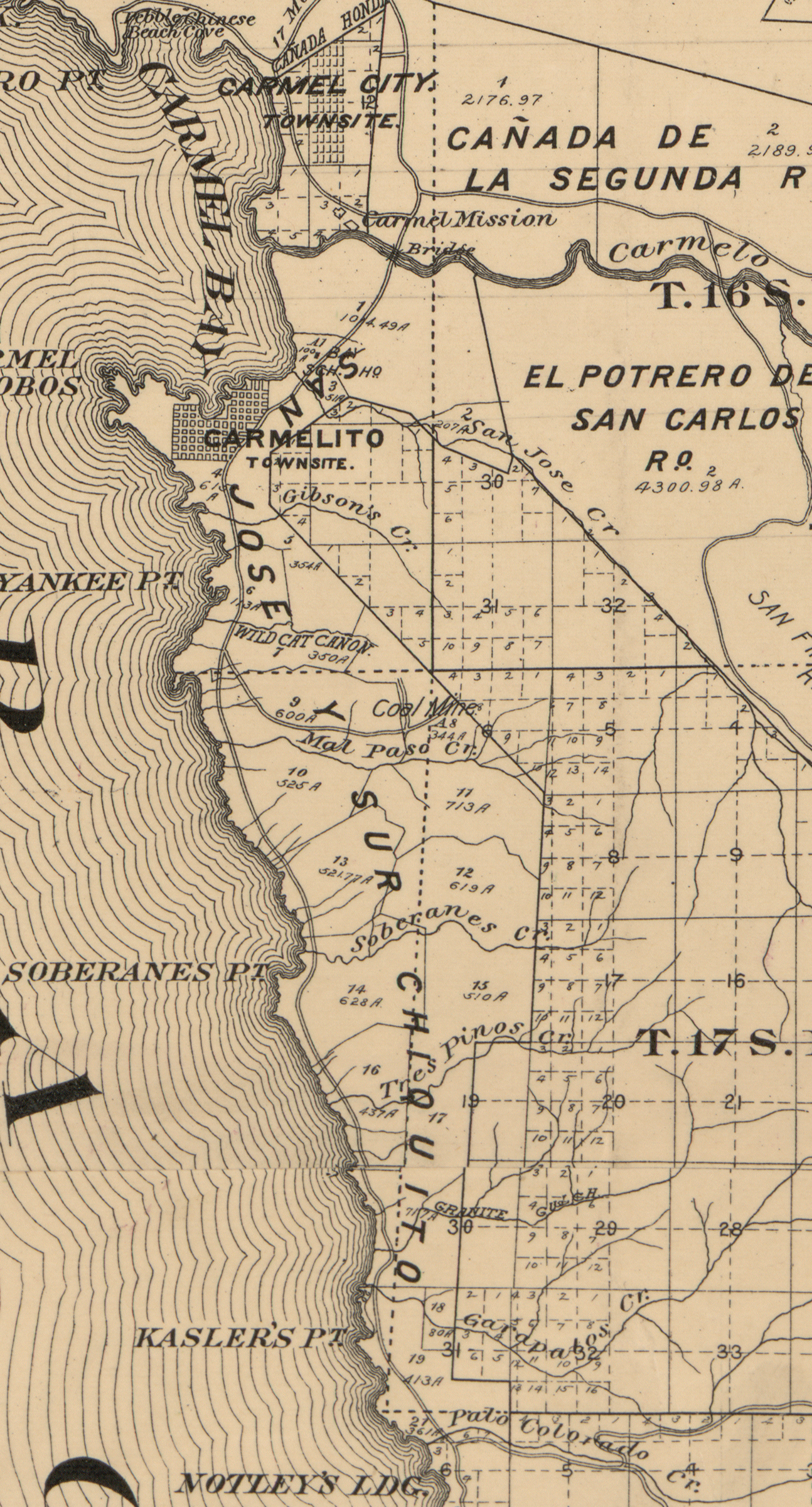
Rancho San Jose y Sur Chiquito 1898

Doud farmed and raised stock. In August 1891, he purchased 5,000 acres (2,000 ha) of the Rancho San José y Sur Chiquito property along the seacoast south of Monterey from Josefa Alvardo de Escobar for $1,000 (equivalent to $35,833 in 2025). On this land he built Doud Ranch, which ran cattle until the early 1950s.

The family's wood-frame ranch house burned to the ground in the 1960s. The State acquired its first parcel of the property in 1980. The Garrapata State Park (Garrapata being Spanish for tick) was classified a state park in 1985.

== Death and legacy ==
Doud died in his home on December 3, 1910, at the age of 90. The inscription on his grave says: "A native of Castle Bar, County Mayo, Ireland aged 90 years."

The Online Archive of California contains the collection known as the Francis Doud Papers that comprises various records spanning the years 1847 to 1919, a significant number of which are accompanied by typewritten duplicates. Among the contents are two letters of correspondence addressed to Doud, one letter directed to Francis Doud Jr. concerning his father's death, and two letters concerning property matters in Monterey, California.

The Monterey Chamber of Commerce said this about the death of Doud: "Whereas, We have heard with profound sorrow of the death of Francis Doud, a respected citizen of this city and an esteemed member of this organization; therefore be it Resolved, that he business of the Monterey Chamber of Commerce be now suspended, that opportunity may be given for tribute to the memory of the late Francis Doud and as a particular mark of respect to his memory and in recognition of his many sacrifices for this county, his family and the community in which he lived... Resolved, that when this meeting adjourn it do so with respect to the memory of our late member Francis Doud. Resolved, that a copy of these resolutions be transmitted to the family of the late Francis Doud, and that a copy of these resolutions be spread upon the minutes of this meeting."

== See also ==
- Coastal California
