= Pfeiffer-Redwood Creek =

Stream in Big Sur, California, U.S.

Coordinates: 36.2511°N 121.7863°W

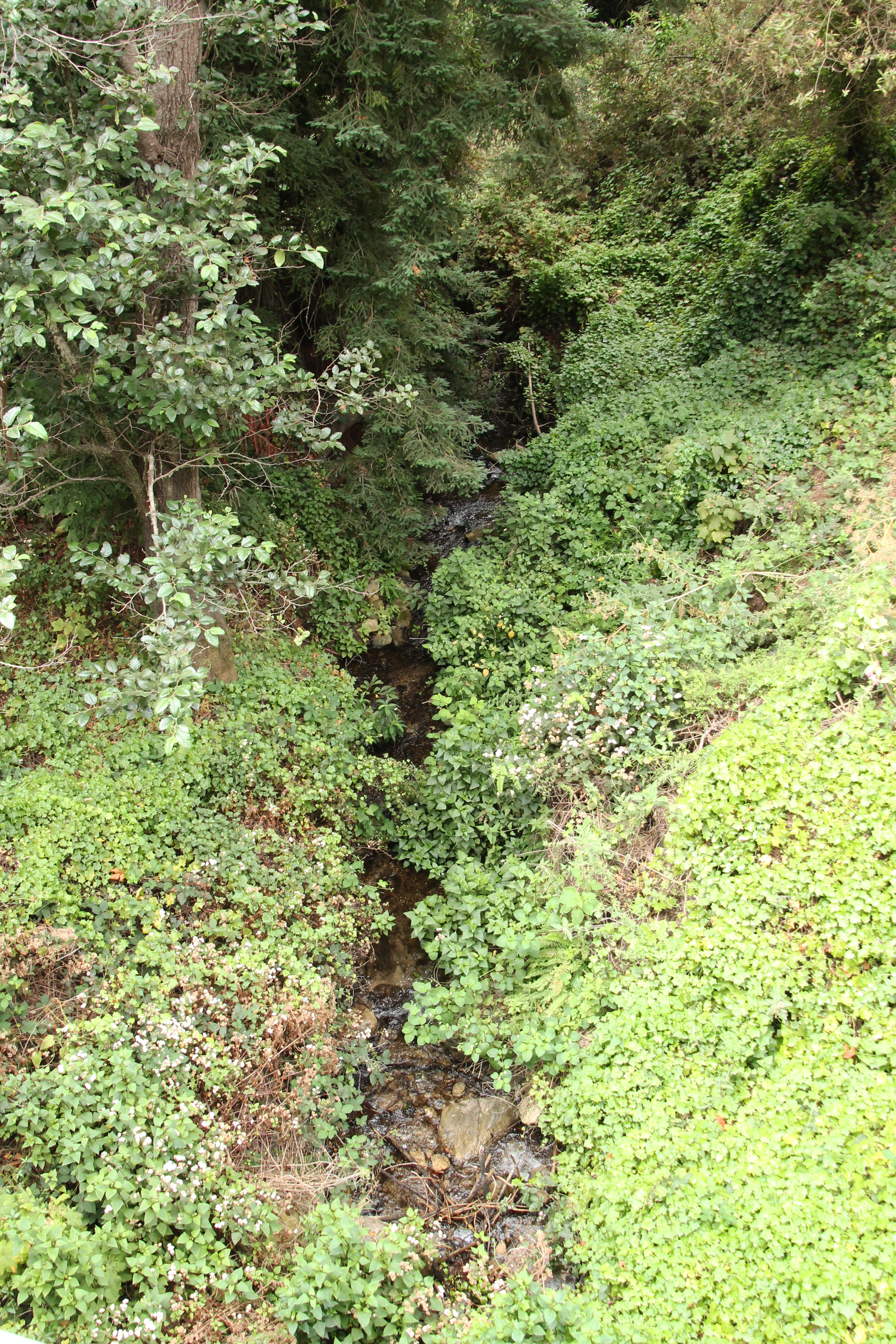
Pfeiffer-Redwood Creek

Pfeiffer-Redwood Creek is a stream in Big Sur, California, about 26 miles from Carmel. It is a tributary to the Big Sur River. The creek feeds the 40-foot (12.2m) Pfeiffer Falls, inside of Julia Pfeiffer Burns State Park. It is named for John Pfeiffer, a homesteader who had 160 acres (0.65 km^{2}) of land in the Big Sur River area.
