= Ventana Wilderness =

Protected wilderness area in California, United States

- IUCN category Ib (wilderness area)
- Location within California Location within the United States
- Interactive map of Ventana Wilderness
- Location: Los Padres National Forest, Monterey County, California, United States
- Nearest city: Monterey, California
- Coordinates: 36°15′0″N 121°40′0″W
- Area: 375 mi^{2} (970 km^{2})
- Established: August 18, 1969
- Governing body: U.S. Forest Service / Bureau of Land Management

The Ventana Wilderness of Los Padres National Forest is a federally designated wilderness area located in the Santa Lucia Range along the Central Coast of California. This wilderness was established in 1969 when the Ventana Wilderness Act redesignated the 87.2-square-mile (226-square-kilometer) Ventana Primitive Area as the Ventana Wilderness and added land, totalling 153 mi^{2} (400 km^{2}). In 1978, the Endangered American Wilderness Act added 95 mi^{2} (250 km^{2}), increasing the total wilderness area to about 248 mi^{2} (640 km^{2}). The California Wilderness Act of 1984 added about 4.3 mi^{2} (11 km^{2}). The Los Padres Condor Range and River Protection Act of 1992 created the approximately 23-square-mile (60-square-kilometer) Silver Peak Wilderness and added about 60.6 mi^{2} (157 km^{2}) to the Ventana Wilderness in addition to designating the Big Sur River as a Wild and Scenic River. The Big Sur Wilderness and Conservation Act of 2002 expanded the wilderness for the fifth time, adding nearly 55 mi^{2} (140 km^{2}), increasing the total acreage of the wilderness to its present size of 375 mi^{2} (970 km^{2}).

== Etymology ==
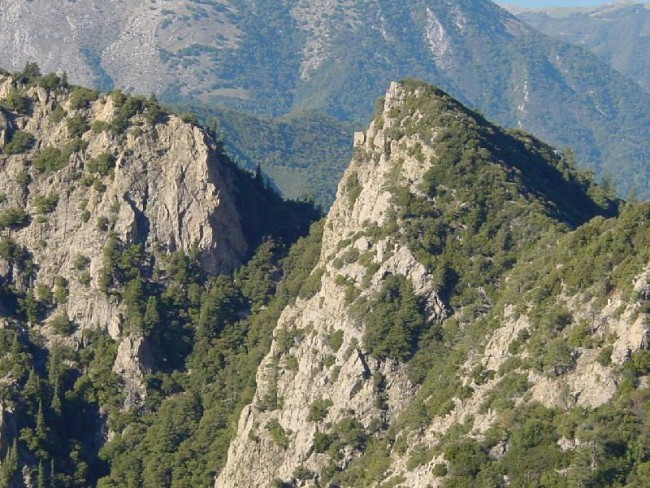
The "Window" seen from the Ventana Doublecone peak in the Ventana Wilderness.

The Ventana Wilderness is named for the unique notch called "The Window" (ventana in Spanish) on a ridge near Ventana Double Cone. According to local legend, this notch was once a natural stone arch.

== History ==
=== Native America use ===
Archaeological evidence shows that the Esselen lived in Big Sur as early as 3500 BC, leading a nomadic, hunter-gatherer existence.

The indigenous people lived near the coast in winter, where they harvested rich stocks of mussels, abalone and other sea life. In the summer and fall they moved inland to harvest acorns gathered from the black oak, canyon live oak and tanbark oak, primarily on upper slopes in areas on the upper slopes of the steep canyons.

Pico Blanco, which splits the north and south forks of the Little Sur River, was sacred in the native traditions of the Rumsien and the Esselen, who revered the mountain as a sacred place from which all life originated. The Spanish mission system led to the virtual destruction of the Indian population. Estimates for the pre-contact populations of most native groups in California have varied substantially. Alfred L. Kroeber suggests a 1770 population for the Esselen of 500. Sherburne F. Cook raises this estimate to 750. A more recent calculation (based on baptism records and density) is that they numbered 1,185-1,285.

=== Founding and additions ===
U.S. Forest Service Chief Forester R. Y. Stuart ordered the Monterey Ranger District to establish the Ventana Primitive Area. It originally consisted of 71 mi^{2} (180 km^{2}) and was enlarged in 1937 to about 87.3 mi^{2} (226 km^{2}). When the U.S. Congress passed the Wilderness Act of 1964, the Ventana Primitive Area was formally designated as wilderness by law, rather than by a Forest Service regulation, which made the area's status subject to change at will. The Ventana Wilderness Area was formally established on August 18, 1969. The Ventana initially included 257 mi^{2} (670 km^{2}) of primarily extremely rugged terrain within the Santa Lucia Range of the Monterey Ranger District.

In 1978, the Endangered American Wilderness Act added 95 mi^{2} (250 km^{2}), increasing the total wilderness area to about 248 mi^{2} (640 km^{2}). The California Wilderness Act of 1984 added about 4 mi^{2} (10 km^{2}). In 1992, the Los Padres Condor Range and River Protection Act created the approximately 23-square-mile (60-square-kilometer) (Silver Peak Wilderness and added about 60.6 mi^{2} (157 km^{2}) to the Ventana Wilderness. In 1998, the Ventana Wilderness Alliance was organized. At their founding, they conducted an inventory of public lands within the Los Padres National Forest Monterey Ranger District. Their goal was to assess the suitability of land in the region for inclusion in federal wilderness. Their findings persuaded US Congressman Sam Farr to sponsor the Big Sur Wilderness and Conservation Act. On December 19, 2002, the Act added 53 mi^{2} (140 km^{2}) to the existing wilderness, bringing it to a total of 375 square miles (970 km^{2})., and increasing the total acreage of the wilderness to its present size. A very small part, 1.15 mi^{2} (3.0 km^{2}), on the eastern edge of the wilderness is managed by the Bureau of Land Management.

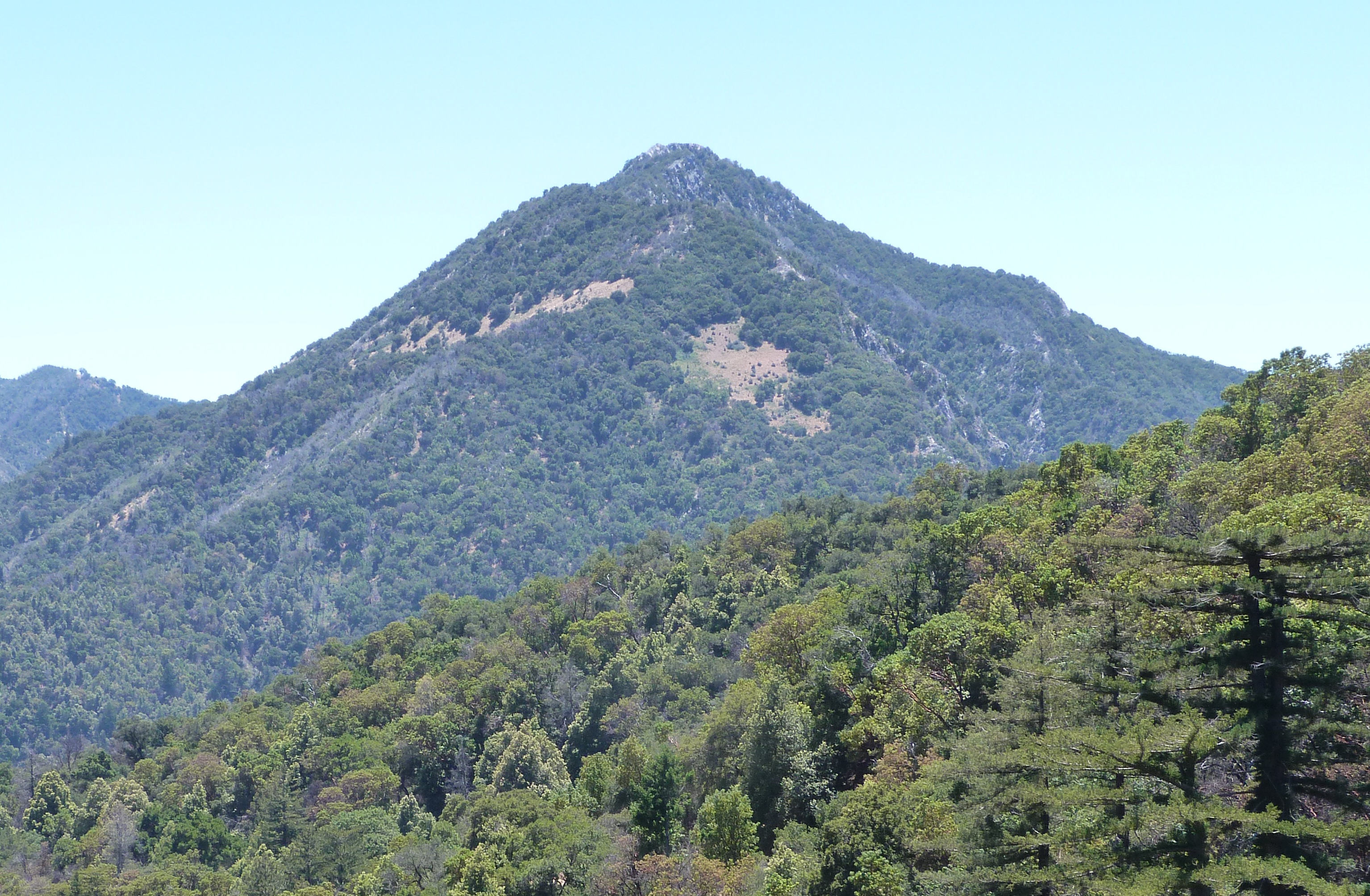
Pico Blanco

== Topography ==
The topography of the Ventana Wilderness is characterized by steep-sided, sharp-crested ridges separating V-shaped youthful valleys. Most streams fall rapidly through narrow, vertical-walled canyons over bedrock or a veneer of boulders. Waterfalls, deep pools and thermal springs are found along major streams. Elevations range from 600 feet (180 m), where the Big Sur River leaves the Wilderness, to about 5,750 feet (1,750 m) at the wilderness boundary near Junipero Serra Peak.

== Climate ==
Climate data for Ventana Wilderness
Month	Jan	Feb	Mar	Apr	May	Jun	Jul	Aug	Sep	Oct	Nov	Dec	Year
Mean daily maximum °F (°C)	51.2 (10.7)	50.6 (10.3)	53.1 (11.7)	57.4 (14.1)	64.3 (17.9)	73.1 (22.8)	81.0 (27.2)	80.2 (26.8)	76.5 (24.7)	68.5 (20.3)	56.7 (13.7)	49.9 (9.9)	63.5 (17.5)
Mean daily minimum °F (°C)	38.5 (3.6)	36.9 (2.7)	38.4 (3.6)	40.2 (4.6)	47.1 (8.4)	54.4 (12.4)	62.1 (16.7)	61.6 (16.4)	57.3 (14.1)	49.7 (9.8)	42.4 (5.8)	37.9 (3.3)	47.2 (8.5)
Average precipitation inches (mm)	15.15 (385)	13.79 (350)	9.80 (249)	4.35 (110)	1.80 (46)	0.51 (13)	0.14 (3.6)	0.05 (1.3)	0.16 (4.1)	2.60 (66)	5.63 (143)	12.04 (306)	66.02 (1,677)
Source: prism

== Flora and fauna ==
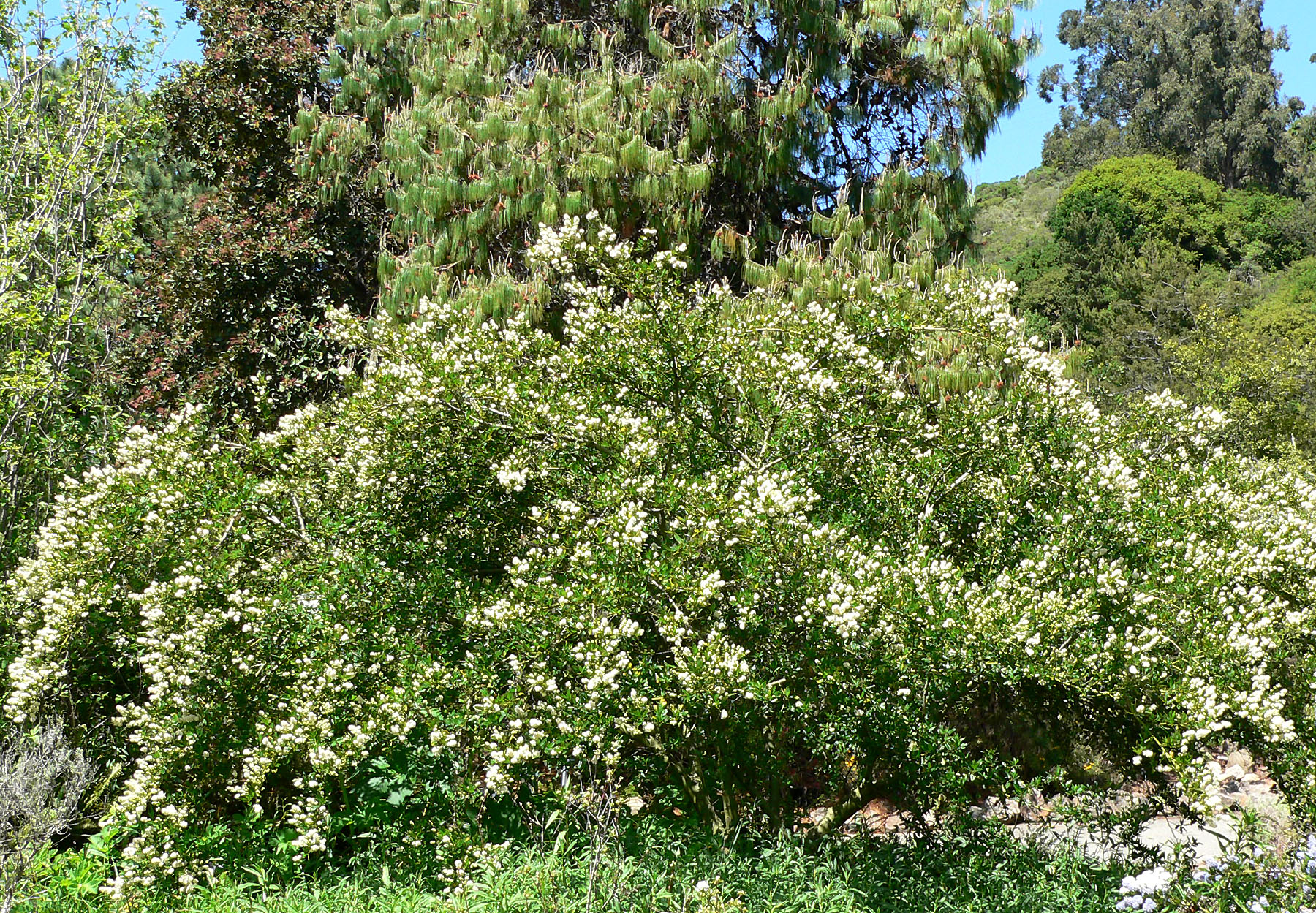
Ceanothus thyrsiflorus (white form) at the University of California Botanical Garden, Berkeley, California

Marked vegetation changes occur within the Wilderness, attributable to dramatic climatic and topographic variations coupled with an extensive fire history. Much of the Ventana Wilderness is covered by dense communities of chaparral, a group of fire-prone plant species, consisting largely of chamise and various species of manzanita and ceanothus. Other plant communities found in area include oak woodland (coast live oak, valley oak, etc.) and pine woodlands (Coulter pine and Knobcone pine). Poison oak is found throughout the area. Deep narrow canyons cut by the fast moving Big Sur and Little Sur rivers support stands of coastal redwood (some old-growth forest), big leaf maple, and sycamore. Small scattered stands of the rare, endemic bristlecone fir may be found on rocky slopes and canyon bottoms. Mountain lion, bobcat, bear, deer, fox and coyotes range the wilderness, as does the California condor, reintroduced to the region by the Ventana Wildlife Society.

== Access ==
During the 1930s, the United States Civilian Conservation Corps constructed an extensive network of trails and trailheads that provided access to the Wilderness. A number of these are no longer in use. The Pine Ridge trailhead at Big Sur Station near Pfeiffer Big Sur State Park is by far the most popular starting point.
