= Big Sur Station =

Ranger station in California

Big Sur Station is a multiagency visitor center and ranger station operated by Caltrans, the Los Padres National Forest, and California State Parks. It is approximately 26 miles south of Carmel, California, near Big Sur, California. It is near the Pfeiffer Canyon Bridge.

It serves as the western terminus of the 23 mile Pine Ridge Trail.
