= Pine Ridge Trail =

Hiking trail in California, United States

- Length: 23 mi (37 km)
- Location: Monterey County, California, USA
- Trailheads: China Camp, near Tassajara Hot Springs; Big Sur Station, USFS
- Use: Backpacking, hiking, trail running, trail riding
- Difficulty: Moderate
- Months: Year Round
- Sights: Santa Lucia Mountains, Carmel River, Big Sur River
- Maintained by: Los Padres National Forest, Ventana Wilderness

The Pine Ridge Trail (USFS 3E06) is the most popular hiking trail in the Ventana Wilderness of the Los Padres National Forest, California. The 19.5 miles (31.4 km) trail traverses the Ventana Wilderness from the Big Sur Station near sea level to China Camp on Tassajara Road at 5,000 feet (1,500 m). Built in 1916 by the Post family of Big Sur, the Pine Ridge Trail offers hikers and equestrians an array of backcountry camps to enjoy.

It transits a broad variety of ecosystems, including mixed hardwood forested ridges, dense chaparral, riparian woods, and redwood forests. The western portion was initially closed in July 2017 due to damage from the Soberanes Fire and subsequent rains, which caused multiple landslides, wiping out the path, and left more than 100 trees blocking the trail. In January, 2020, the Forest Service announced that the trail was being reconstructed. In late 2022, the trail was reopened but in March 2023 the portion from Ventana Camp to Terrace Creek was closed again.

== Location ==
The trail is considered "strenuous and challenging even for experienced hikers". It crosses the Ventana Wilderness east to west from 4,260 foot (1,300 m) China Camp on Tassajara Road and Chews Ridge to Big Sur Ranger Station at about 300 feet (91 m). It is the most popular trail in the Ventana Region. The trail offers equestrians an array of backcountry camps. The interior portion of the trail traverse conifer and mixed hardwood forested ridges and meadows at Pine Ridge, Divide, and Pine Valley camps. The western half passes through redwood-shaded Terrace Creek, Barlow, Sykes and Redwood Camps. A California Campfire permit is required to operate a small gas or propane stove.

== Access ==
When the trail is open, There is limited parking at the Pine Ridge trailhead near China Camp. On the western end there is a secure parking lot at the Big Sur Ranger Station. Parking is $10.00 per day. The trail head there is the wilderness entry point of choice for many backcountry travelers. While many use it for access to the riverside camps along the Big Sur River, it also gives access to several loop trips in the Ventana Wilderness.

From the east, you can access the upper portion of the trail from China Camp. The trail head is about 34 miles (55 km) and a 90-minute drive from Monterey. There is no overnight trailhead parking without a campground reservation. Portions of the road from Tassajara Road to Chews Ridge are suitable for high-clearance vehicles or four-wheel drive vehicles. During the winter or in inclement weather, the road may not be passable.

=== Campsites ===
- China Camp (4260', 0 mi)
- Church Creek Divide, Junction with Church Creek Trail and Carmel River Trail (3651', 3.6 mi)
- Divide Camp (3800', 4.0 mi)
- Junction with Black Cone Trail and Bear Basin Trail (4530', 7.3 mi)
- Pine Ridge Camp (4100', 7.8 mi)
- Redwood Camp (1800', 10.9 mi)
- Sykes Camp (1080', 13.2 mi)
- Barlow Flat Camp (900', 16.1 mi)
- Terrace Creek Camp, junction with the Terrace Creek Trail (1350', 17.5 mi)
- Trail to Ventana Camp, heads 1-mile (1.6 km) down to camp on the Big Sur River (1500', 18.7 mi)
- Big Sur Station (370', 23.0 mi)

=== Closure ===
The Pine Ridge Trail was closed during the Soberanes Fire in June 2017. The western portion of the trail between Big Sur Station and the junction with the Big Sur Trail was severely damaged by the fire and rain during the following winter. As of August 2018, the western trail is blocked by multiple washouts along creeks and dozens of fallen trees across the path. In addition to the Pine Ridge Trail, the trails to Terrace Creek and Ventana Camp, and the Sykes, Barlow Flat, Redwood, Terrace Creek, and Ventana Campgrounds are closed. The Forest Service stated that they intend to strictly enforce the closure order. Violators are subject to a penalty of $5,000 and/or six months in jail.

When U.S. Forest Service staff surveyed damage to the trail, they found over 100 downed trees, lot of brush growing over the trail, and four major slides where sections of the trail are entirely gone. Reopening the trail requires an environmental assessment and perhaps re-routing the trail entirely. Because the area is a federal wilderness and includes a wild and scenic river corridor, reconstruction may require specialized professional trail-building crews with skill in blasting and possibly even new bridges to be built. The trail was closed indefinitely.

In January, 2020, the Forest Service announced that trail crews were restoring and partially rerouting the trail. It might open in the summer of 2020. They also stated that the rudimentary hot springs enclosures built at Sykes Camp had been destroyed by floods, and that the Forest Service would not allow them to be rebuilt. "The hot tubs are not going to be allowed back," Forest Service spokesperson Lynn Olson stated. The artificial structures violate wilderness ethics and laws that do not permit man-made structures. The trail has since been re-opened.

== History ==
Construction of the 27 miles (43 km) trail from China Camp was begun in late April, 1916, soon after the land was added to the Monterey National Forest. It was built by a crew supervised by Monterey Forest District Ranger O. O. Bundy and Foreman Ed Burns. The trail was financed by the Forest Service, Monterey County, and private individuals and companies. Its original purpose was a fire patrol route and to enable fire crews access to the back country in case of fire. Tassajara Hot Springs was accessible from the eastern end of the trail, which terminated near the Pfeiffer Hotel in Big Sur. It was also mentioned as a possible recreational trail during its construction. They also built a trail from the Pine Ridge trail to Pine Valley and repaired a phone line from Arroyo Seco to the Arbolado ranger station in Big Sur.
