= Pfeiffer Big Sur State Park =

State park in California, United States

- IUCN category III (natural monument or feature)
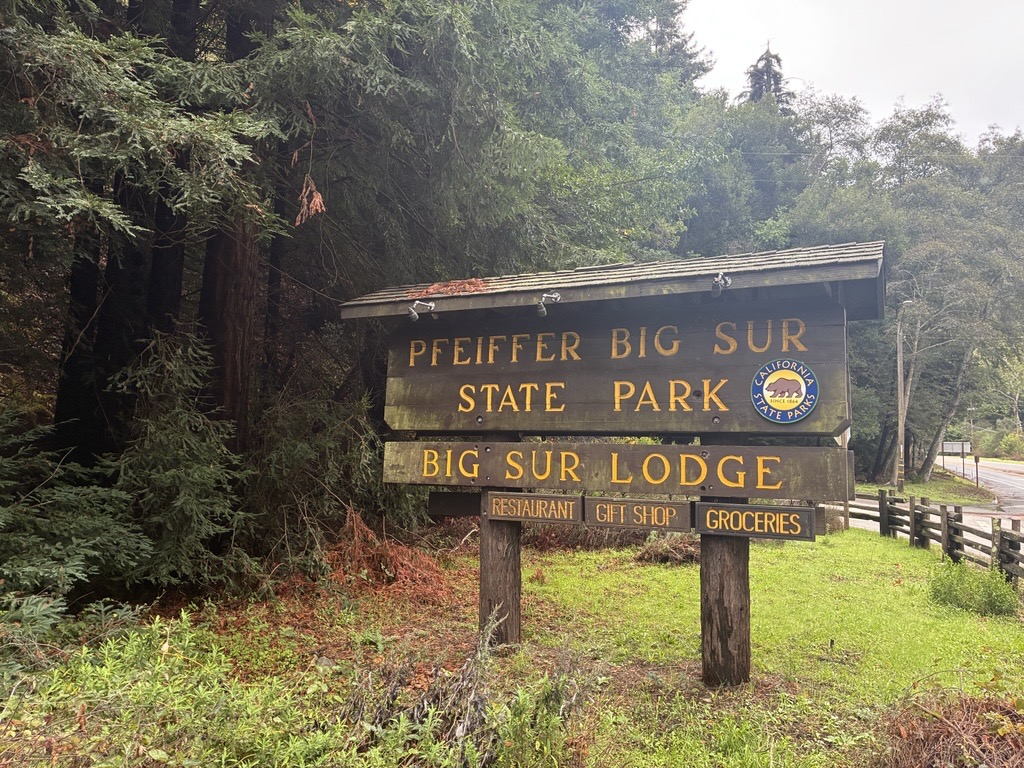
- Pfeiffer Big Sur State Park entrance sign

- Location within California Location within the United States
- Location: Monterey County, California, United States
- Nearest city: Big Sur, California
- Coordinates: 36°15′N 121°47′W
- Area: 1,000 acres (400 ha)
- Governing body: California Department of Parks and Recreation

Pfeiffer Big Sur State Park is a state park in Monterey County, California, near the area of Big Sur on the state's Central Coast. It covers approximately 1,006 acres (407 ha) of land. The park is centered on the Big Sur River. It has been nicknamed a "mini Yosemite". A Redwood tree in the park nicknamed the Colonial Tree is estimated to be between 1,100 and 1,200 years old. Part of the natural area is old-growth forest and recognized by Old-Growth Forest Network.

== Early history ==
=== Native Americans ===
The Esselen people were the first known residents of the Big Sur area. They lived in the area from about Point Sur south to Big Creek, and inland including the upper tributaries of the Carmel River and Arroyo Seco watersheds. Archaeological evidence shows that the Esselen lived in Big Sur as early as 3500 BC, leading a nomadic, hunter-gatherer existence. The aboriginal people inhabited fixed village locations, and followed food sources seasonally, living near the coast in winter to harvest rich stocks of otter, mussels, abalone, and other sea life. In the summer and fall, they traveled inland to gather acorns and hunt deer.

The native people hollowed mortar holes into large exposed rocks or boulders which they used to grind the acorns into flour. These can be found throughout the region. Arrows were made of cane and pointed with hardwood foreshafts. The tribes also used controlled burning techniques to increase tree growth and food production. Based on baptism records in the Spanish mission system and population density, their population has been estimated to have been from 1,185-1,285. Their population was limited in part due to inaccessible nature of the Santa Lucia Mountains. They were and are one of the least numerous indigenous people in California. By about 1822, much of the California Indian population in proximity to the missions had been forced into the mission system.

=== European homesteaders ===
The first known European settler in Big Sur was John Davis, who in 1853 claimed a tract of land along the Big Sur River. He built a cabin near the present day site of the beginning of the Mount Manuel Trail. In 1868, Native Americans Manual and Florence Innocenti bought Davis' cabin and land for $50.

== Pfeiffer family ==
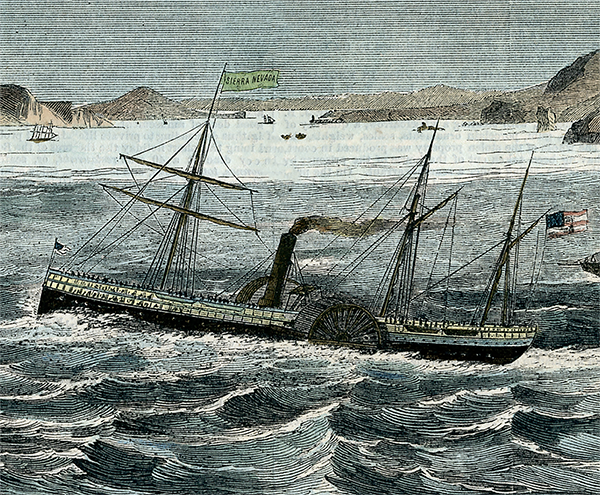
Sierra Nevada at the Golden Gate in 1857. She was shipwrecked on October 17, 1869, shortly after the Pfeiffer family disembarked.

Sébastien Pfeiffer (born in Dolving, Moselle, Lorraine, France, in 1794) and his wife, Catherine Vetzer (born in Haut-Clocher, Moselle, Alsace-Champagne-Ardenne-Lorraine, in 1795), were married in 1819. Around 1830, they and their five children immigrated to St. Clair County, Illinois.

=== Arrival in California ===
Their son Michael (born on September 18, 1832) and two brothers, Joseph, and Alexander, left Illinois during the California Gold Rush for the gold fields of Sierra County, California, near the border with Nevada.

Michael Pfeiffer returned to Illinois and married sixteen-year-old Barbara Laquet on April 14, 1859. A few months later they joined a wagon train which followed the Butterfield Overland Stage route from St. Louis, Missouri, west to California. Michael brought several brood mares with him. They rejoined his brothers Joseph and Alexander and grew wheat in northern California. Then they rented a farm in Solano County, where Vacaville is now located. Their sons Charles and John were born there in 1860 and 1862 and their daughter Mary Ellen was born in 1866. When the owner raised their rent, they were forced to leave. While living in Tomales Bay, they learned that much of the good arable land in California had been claimed. But a neighbor told them that to the south of Rancho El Sur in a place known as Pacific Valley there remained good grazing land. They knew the Homestead Act of 1862 allowed them to file a land patent for a five-dollar fee.

=== Travel to Big Sur ===
On October 5, 1869, the Pfeiffers boarded the Northern Pacific Transportation Company’s 222 feet (68 m) side wheel passenger steamer Sierra Nevada at the Folsom Street wharf in San Francisco with their livestock and headed 120 miles (190 km) south to Monterey. The ship carried up to 345 passengers. It was struck by a raging storm while at sea, causing waves to break over the deck. When they arrived at Monterey after two days, their mother was so sick she could not walk. The Pfeiffer family was fortunate to get off the ship in Monterey. On the night of October 17, having left Monterey that afternoon, the ship was wrecked in dense fog on a reef 1.6 nautical miles; 1.9 miles (3 km) north of Piedras Blancas. All of the passengers and crew were saved, but the ship and its cargo were a total loss.

After traveling for four days and about 40 miles (64 km) down the rugged coast, they had passed through the Cooper Ranch and the Molera Ranch. On October 14, 1869, one of their sons became sick. Unsure how many more days it would take to reach Pacific Valley, they decided to stop and rest. They traveled south about 6 miles (9.7 km) more miles until they found a clearing in present-day Sycamore Canyon, where they camped for several nights.

They liked the area so much they decided to wait for spring before moving south. By then they found the area so favorable that they decided to stay put. They had four more children: William, Frank, Flora, and Adelaide. Michael built a small cabin of hand-split redwood north of the mouth of Sycamore Canyon. He filed for patents on his land in 1883 and 1889. Michael's son John and his wife Florence Zulema built their own cabin on the north bank of the Big Sur River in 1884.

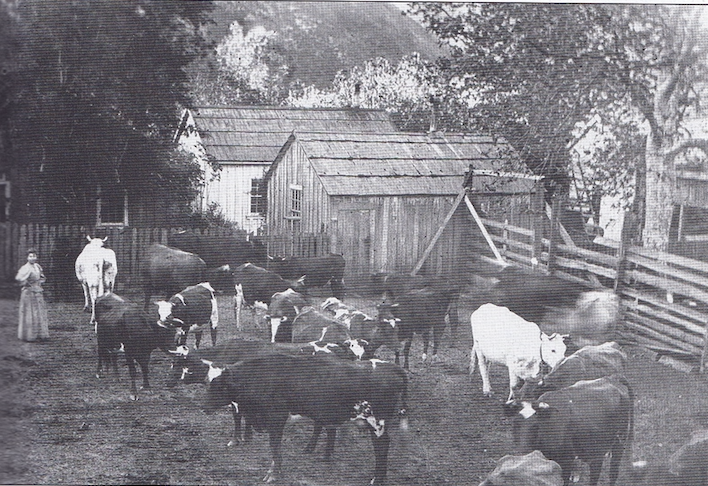
Kate Pfeiffer and cattle circa 1900

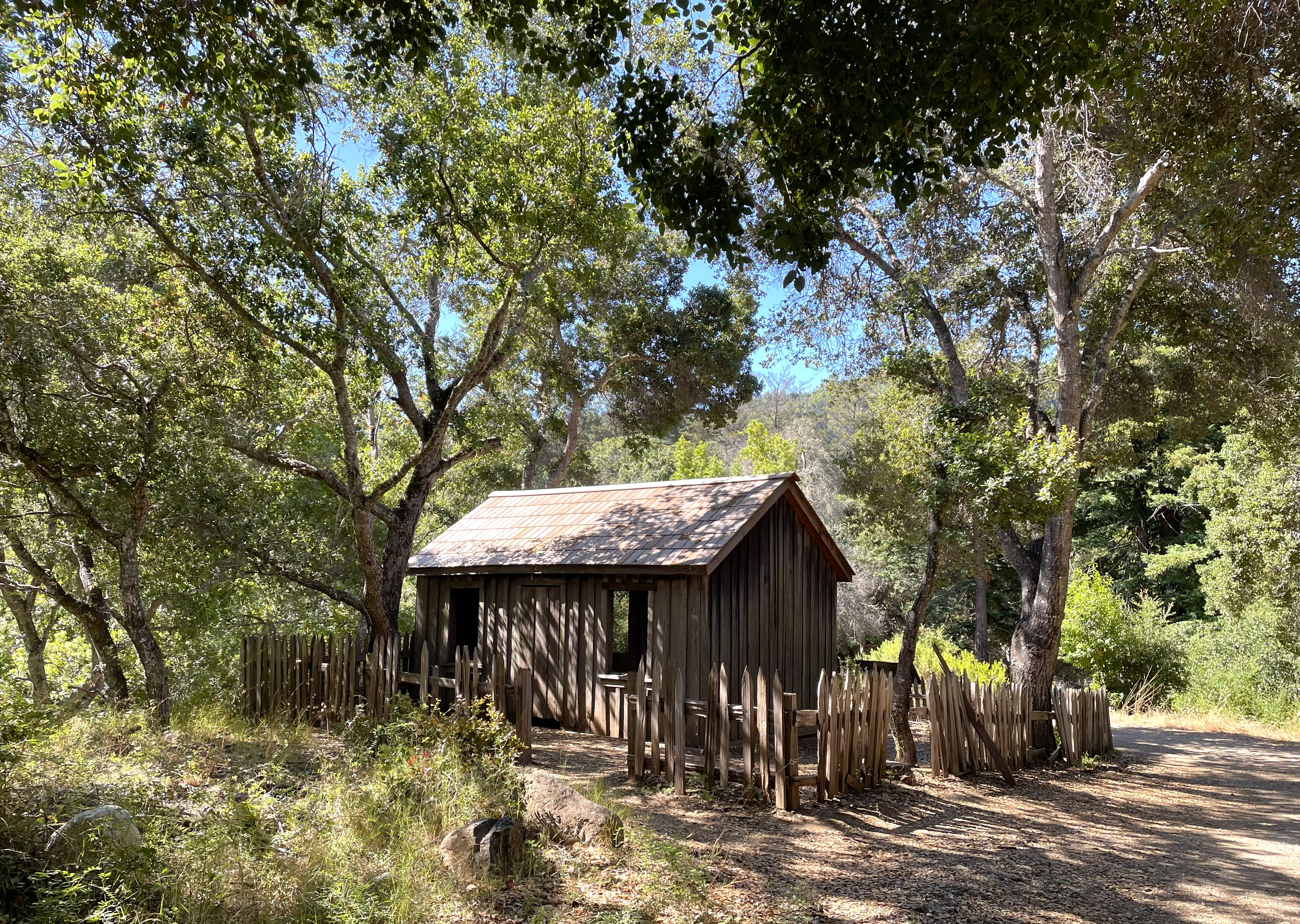
John Pfeiffer's cabin, 2023

=== Pfeiffer Ranch Resort ===
The family supported themselves by farming, ranching, logging, and beekeeping. John produced sixteen tons of premium honey in a year.

As was customary at the time, the Pfeiffer family welcomed travelers along the trail to Posts and the southern Big Sur region into their one room cabin. They gave travelers their own beds, and meals, and they fed and stabled the stock. The Pfeiffer home became well known among travelers along the coast, and the number of guests grew. People were attracted by the fishing, hunting and exploring.

Florence Pfeiffer bore responsibility for caring for visitors and became increasingly disgruntled by the number of visitors, the cost, and workload. Visitors returned often. On one occasion, a repeat guest whom John Pfeiffer disliked stopped at the house with four friends and a string of five pack mules. After a meal and a night's rest, the four friends left on the stage without even a thank you. As he was departing, the packer began to beat one of the mules with a stick.

Florence was incensed at the man's discourteous and abusive nature. Stepping out of character, she rebuked the man and forbade him from beating the animal any further. In her memoirs, she recounted telling him, "From now on, I expect to charge you so much for each horse, so much for each bed, and so much for each meal every time you stop here."

They began charging visitors and Pfeiffer Ranch Resort was born in 1908. It was the first formal lodging along the coast. Over time they added a porch that served as a dining room and several cabins. Because the coast road was impassable in winter, it was only open in summer. Food was served family style. Most guests traveled by stagecoach which during summer months arrived on Monday. Wednesday, and Friday. In 1920, the 26 mi (42 km) trip from Monterey took about 11 hours. It competed with the Hotel Idlewild on the banks of the Little Sur River for customers through about 1920.

After completing the eighth grade, their daughter Esther went to live with her grandmother in Monterey so she could attend high school. Due to the stage schedule, she could not easily visit her parents, and returned home only at Christmas, Easter, and during summers. The family home is now the site of the Big Sur Lodge.

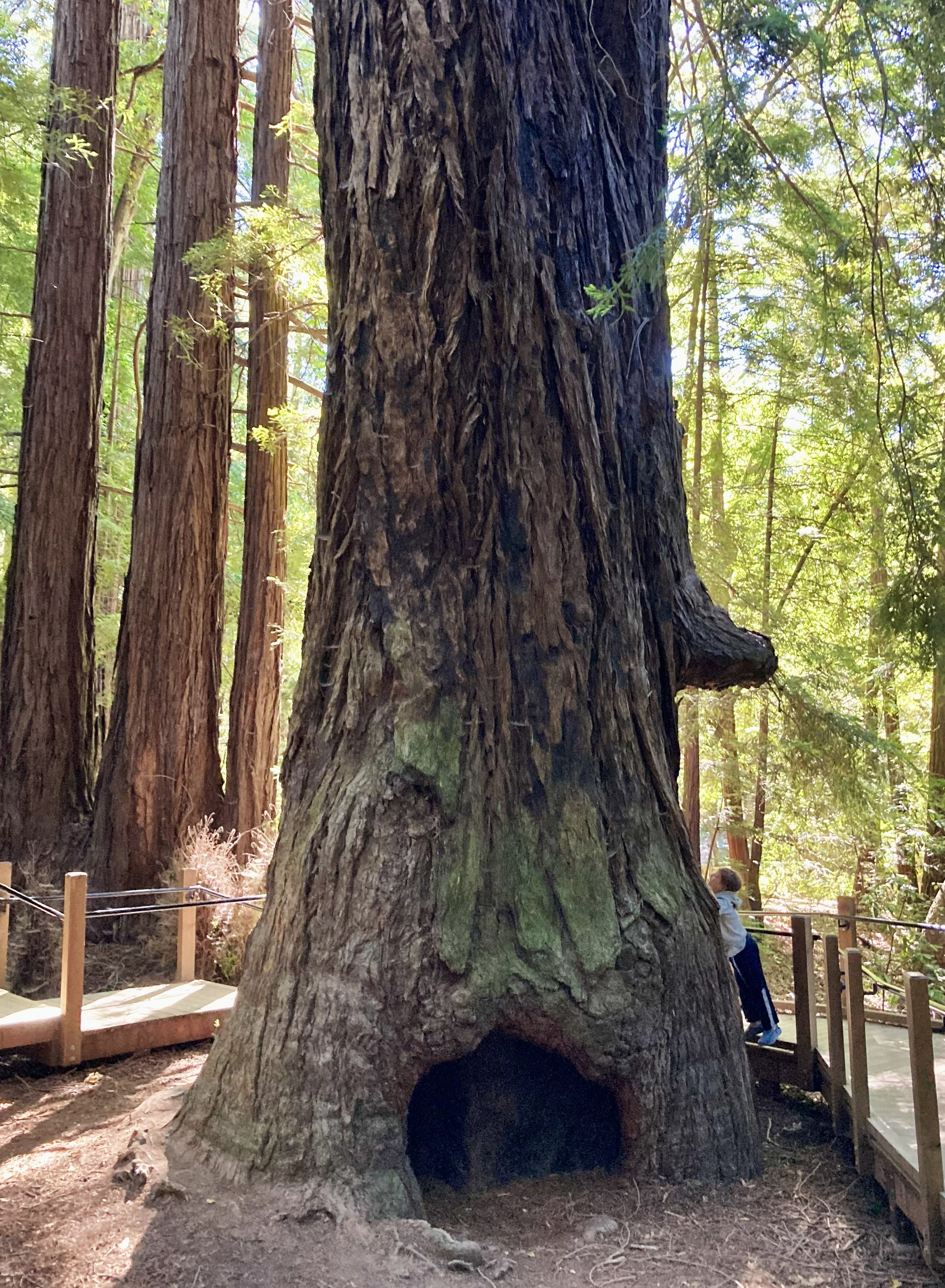
Coast redwood along River Trail, 2023

In 1930, John Pfeiffer was offered $210,000 (or about $3,938,000 today) for his land by a Los Angeles developer who intended to build a subdivision. Pfeiffer wanted to preserve the land he and his family had grown to love, and instead sold 700 acres (2.8 km^{2}) to the state of California in 1933. Pfeiffer Big Sur State Park is named after John Pfeiffer and his family. Several features in Big Sur are named for the descendants of the Pfeiffer family: Pfeiffer Beach, Pfeiffer Falls Trail, Pfeiffer Big Sur State Park, and Julia Pfeiffer Burns State Park.

== Hiking ==
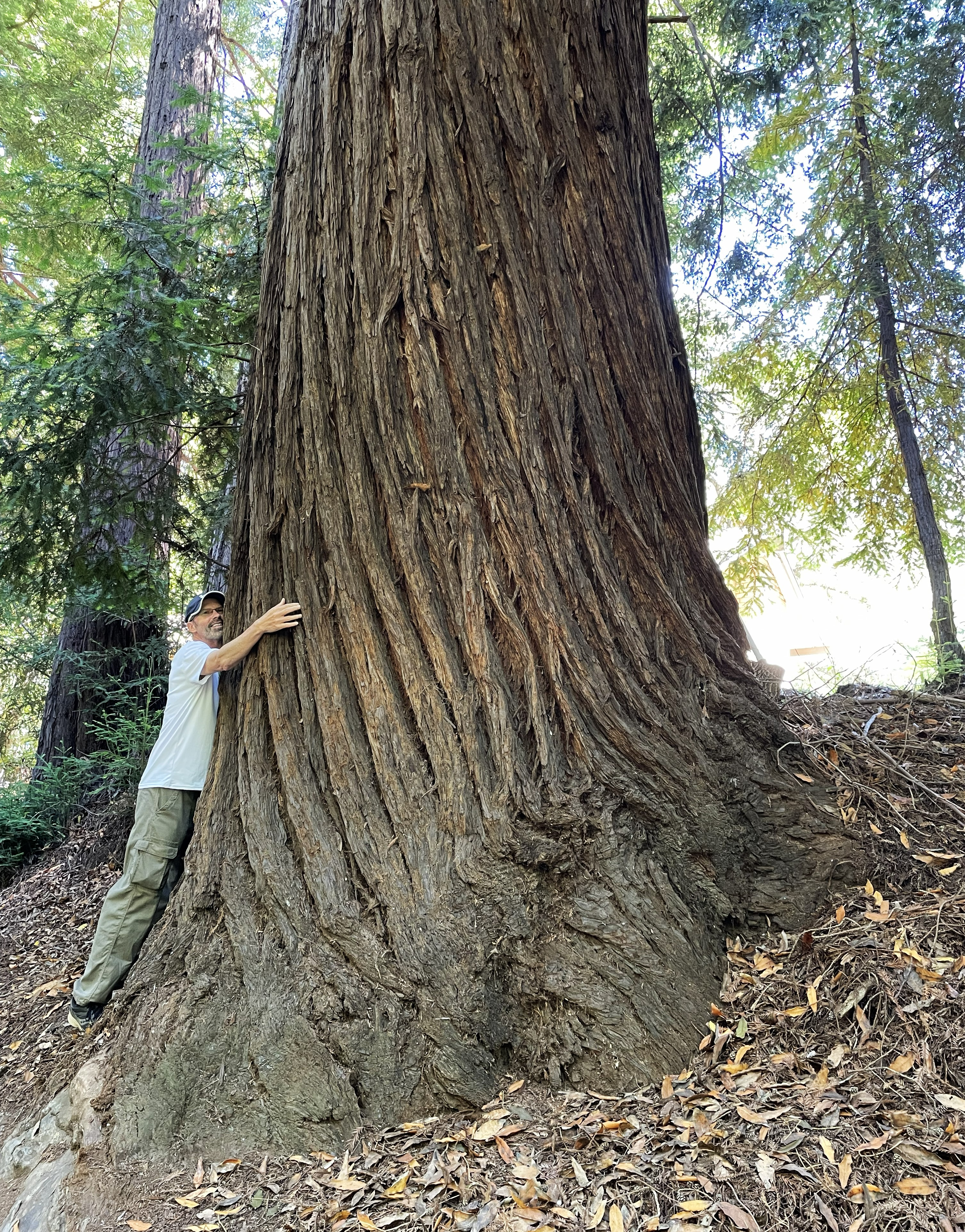

Pfeiffer Big Sur State Park is known for its redwood groves and trail to Pfeiffer Falls. Mud slides caused by the Basin Complex fire necessitated rerouting the Pfeiffer Falls Trail, re-opened 13 years later in 2021. The River Path, which begins near the Big Sur Lodge, is a 0.6 mile loop trail that is wheelchair and stroller accessible.

== Fire impact ==
Pfeiffer Big Sur State Park was damaged by the Basin Complex Fire during June and July 2008, which burned 254.4 mi^{2} (659 km^{2}) in California. Much of the damage was to the outskirts of the park, however, and the campgrounds were able to reopen at the end of July. The Chalk Fire of September and October, which burned an additional 25.4 mi^{2} (66 km^{2}), did serious damage to Pfeiffer Big Sur State Park, which was largely closed from September 2008 to May 2009.
