= Big Sur River =

River in California, United States

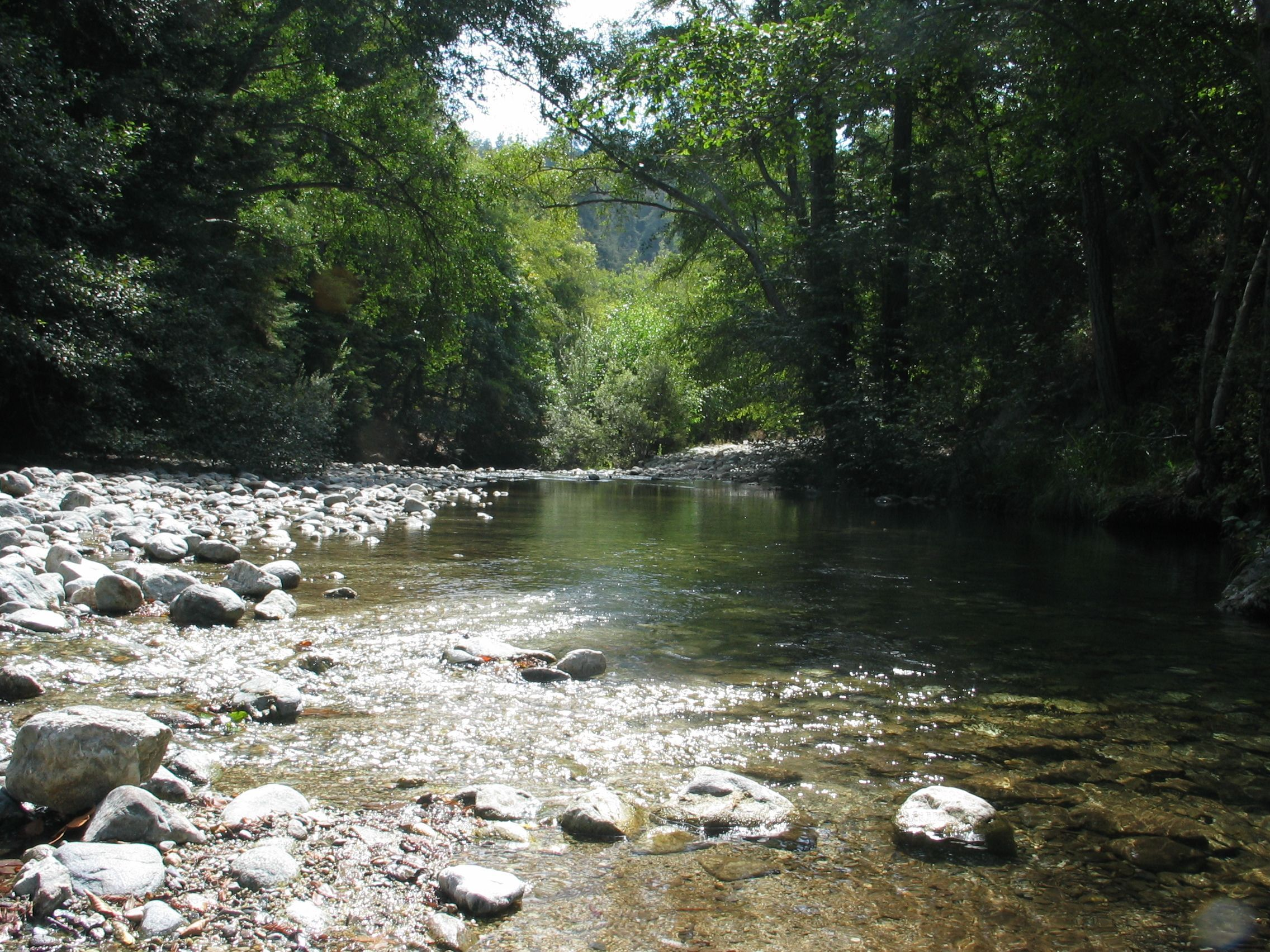
- Big Sur River as it passes the campgrounds

Location
- Country: United States
- State: California
- Region: California Central Coast
- County: Monterey County

Physical characteristics
- Mouth: Pacific Ocean
  - coordinates: 36°16′49.87″N 121°51′35.84″W
  - elevation: 0 ft (0 m)
- Length: 15.7 mi (25.3 km)
- Discharge
  - location: Pacific Ocean

Basin features
- Tributaries
  - left: Ventana Creek, Lion Creek, Cienaga Creek
  - right: Post Creek, Terrace Creek, Logwood Creek, Delores Creek, Mocho Creek

National Wild and Scenic River
- Type: Wild
- Designated: June 19, 1992

The Big Sur River is a 15.7-mile-long (25.3 km) river on the Central Coast of California. The river drains a portion of the Big Sur area, a thinly settled region of the Central California coast where the Santa Lucia Mountains rise abruptly from the Pacific Ocean. The upper river and watershed lies within the Ventana Wilderness and encompasses the headwaters downstream to the area known as the Gorge. The lower river flows roughly northwest through Pfeiffer Big Sur State Park, the Big Sur village, several private camp grounds and Andrew Molera State Park where it flows through a lagoon and sandbar into the Pacific Ocean at the Monterey Bay National Marine Sanctuary. Major Tributaries of the river include, in order: Redwood Creek, Lion Creek, Logwood Creek, Terrace Creek, Ventana Creek, Post Creek, Pfeiffer-Redwood Creek, Juan Higuera Creek, and Pheneger Creek.

Most of the river's 60-square-mile (160 km^{2}) watershed is in the Ventana Wilderness of the Los Padres National Forest. Precipitation increases with altitude at Big Sur, and the higher elevations can receive over 50 inches (1,300 mm) per year, about 10 inches (250 mm) more than lower areas. The average yearly runoff on the river is 65,000 acre-feet (80,000,000 m^{3}). It is the largest river by volume on the Big Sur coast. Water is diverted to a small group of homeowners, and the state claims that wells owned by the El Sur Ranch are diverting underflow from the river. There are no dams or reservoirs.

== Etymology ==
While exploring Alta California, the Portolá expedition arrived at San Carpóforo Canyon near present-day San Simeon on September 13, 1769. After two days of attempts, they decided they could not proceed up the inaccessible coast. Instead, they cut a trail inland through the San Antonio and Salinas Valleys before arriving at Monterey Bay, where they founded Monterey and named it their capital.

The Spanish referred to the vast, relatively unexplored, coastal region to the south as el país grande del sur, meaning "the big country of the south". This was often shortened to el sur grande. The two major rivers were named El Rio Grande del Sur (Big Sur River) and El Rio Chiquito del Sur (Little Sur River) . The first recorded use of the name "el Sud" (meaning "the South") was in the map of the Rancho El Sur land grant given by Governor José Figueroa to Juan Bautista Alvarado on July 30, 1834. The first American use of the name "Sur" was by the U.S. Coast Survey in 1851, which renamed a point of land that looked like an island and was shaped like a trumpet, formerly known as "Morro de la Trompa" and "Punta que Parece Isla" during Spanish times, to Point Sur.

== Water flow ==
In 1977, the US Forest Service measured the maximum runoff in February at 41,860 acre-feet (51,630,000 m^{3}), and the minimum at 1,050 acre-feet (1,300,000 m^{3}). The total runoff was 126,200 acre-feet (155,700,000 m^{3}).

== Dam planned ==
In the late 1800s, the Ventana Power Company operated a sawmill near present-day Pfeiffer Big Sur State Park. They began planning to build a dam on the Big Sur River just downstream of the confluence of Ventana Creek and the Big Sur River. They hoped to sell the electricity to the City of Monterey. They built a diversion channel along the Big Sur River, but the 1906 San Francisco earthquake bankrupted the company, and they abandoned the project. The stonework from the diversion channel is still visible.

== Wild and Scenic River designation ==
A 19.5 miles (31.4 km) stretch of the river is designated as a Wild and Scenic River, from the headwaters of its north and south forks downstream to the boundary of the Ventana Wilderness.

== Vegetation ==
The vegetation of the watershed is diverse. Along the main river canyon and many side tributaries grow riparian species such as California sycamore and white alder. Extensive stands of old-growth redwood trees tower above moist canyons and north-facing slopes below approximately 2400 ft. Above the redwoods, a mixed-hardwood forest of madrone, tanoak, coast live oak, canyon oak, and occasionally ponderosa and Coulter pine predominates. The rare Santa Lucia fir, endemic to the Santa Lucia Mountains, is found scattered in small groves, including one near the confluence of the Big Sur River and Ventana Creek, the lowest elevation (600 feet) known in the wild. On higher, steep, and South-facing slopes the chaparral is found, a scrub community often dominated by chamise and manzanita. Grassland and open pine forest are found on a few ridgetops.

== Recreation ==
The popular 26 miles (42 km) Pine Ridge Trail follows the Big Sur River for several miles inland. Several backcountry camps are located along the river, including Ventana Camp, Barlow Flat Camp, and Sykes Camp. Near Sykes Camp, approximately 10 miles (16 km) inland, there is a hot spring. Small pools were built to impound the water above the riverbank, but floods destroyed these in 2017–18. The USFS stated that the man-made tubs were illegal impoundments that are inconsistent with the intention of a wilderness experience and will not allow them to be rebuilt.

From Sykes, the trail crosses the river, and 3 miles (4.8 km) later reaches Redwood Camp, situated along the tributary Redwood Creek. From here, the trail climbs over 3,000 feet (910 m) to Pine Ridge, and enters the Carmel River watershed, eventually exiting the wilderness at China Camp. As of January 2017, the trail is closed due to damage caused by the Soberanes Fire, the result of an illegal campfire in Garrapata State Park.

== See also ==
- List of rivers of California
- Little Sur River
