= Garrapata State Park =

State park in California, United States

- IUCN category III (natural monument or feature)
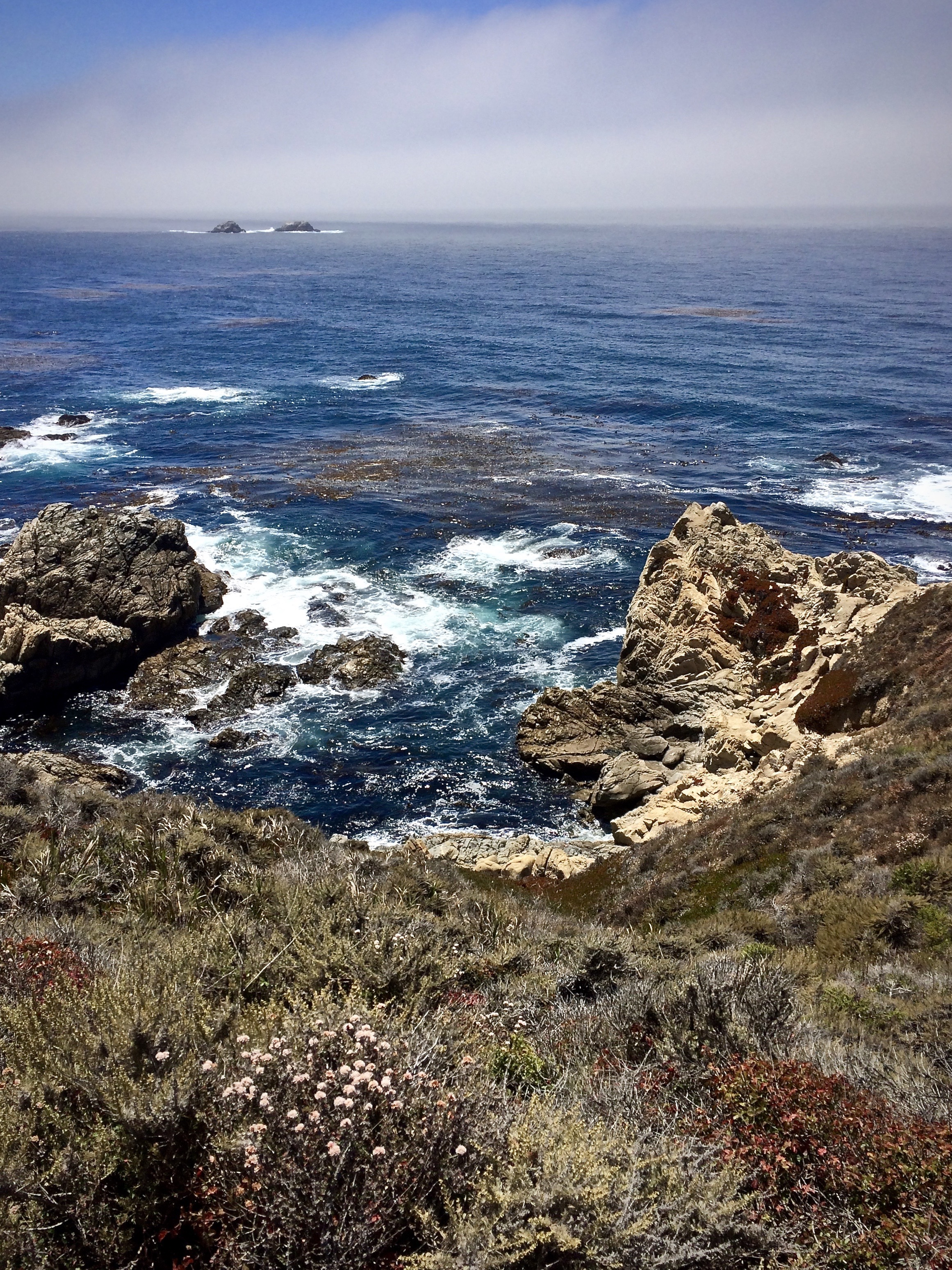
- The granite coast of Garrapata State Park

- Location within California Location within the United States
- Location: Monterey County, California, United States
- Nearest city: Carmel, California
- Coordinates: 36°28′N 121°54′W
- Area: 2,939 acres (1,189 ha)
- Established: 1979
- Governing body: California Department of Parks and Recreation

Garrapata State Park is a state park of California, United States, located on California State Route 1 6.7 miles (10.8 km) south of Carmel-by-the-Sea and 18 miles (29 km) north of Big Sur Village on the Monterey coast. The 2,939-acre (1,189 ha) park was established in 1979. California sea lions, harbor seals and sea otters frequent the coastal waters while gray whales pass close by during their yearly migration.

== Description ==
Garrapata State Park has 2 miles (3.2 km) of beachfront, with coastal hiking and a 50-foot (15 m) climb to a view of the Pacific. The park offers diverse coastal vegetation with trails running from ocean beaches into dense coast redwood groves. The coastal bluffs to the west and east of the Big Sur Coast Highway are covered with coyote bush, California coffeeberry, California sagebrush, bush lupine, blue blossom, and other coastal scrub plants. The park also features coastal headlands at Soberanes Point. California sea lions, harbor seals and sea otters frequent the coastal waters while gray whales pass close by during their yearly migration.

There is no main entrance to the park. Visitors can park in several pullouts along Big Sur Coast Highway starting 5.4 miles (8.7 km) south of Rio Road in Carmel and extending along the coast for about 2.1 miles (3.4 km). It is marked only with one sign on the west side of the road. Numbered turnouts mark each parking area.

Edward Weston, who lived nearby in Carmel, made a number of his best-known photos in or near what is now the State Park. The beaches in the park have been used for nude recreation.

== History ==
The area hosted the Ohlone and Rumsien tribes in the past. In 1835, the portion of the park land generally to the west of a line along the Rocky Ridge Trail was part of Rancho San Jose y Sur Chiquito. It was given by Alta California Governor Juan Alvarado to Teodoro Gonzalez and re-granted in the same year to Marcelino Escobar. The grant stretched along the coast from the Carmel River to Palo Colorado Creek and was used for ranching.

Jose Maria Soberanes served with the Gaspar de Portola expedition in 1769. Seven years later, Soberanes served as a guide for De Anza, whose party pushed north to San Francisco Bay. He remained in California and grandson Jose Antonio Ezequiel Soberanes bought the land. Soberanes operated a prosperous cattle and sheep ranch for 24 years. The Soberanes family, locally famed for their musical talents, also offered their hospitality to other ranchers traveling along the coast to Monterey.

Francis Doud, an early Monterey resident, purchased the Soberanes land and other parcels in 1891 to create the Doud Ranch, which ran cattle until the early 1950s. The family's wood-frame ranch house burned to the ground in the 1960s. The state acquired its first parcel of the property in 1980; Garrapata (Spanish for tick) was classified a state park in 1985. Some features within the park still bear the names of these families.

=== Soberanes fire ===
Most of the park was burned by the 2016 Soberanes Fire, which began in the park as the result of an illegal campfire. The fire burned for more than two months. It resulted in the death of a bulldozer operator and destroyed 57 residences. It was at the time the most expensive fire in United States history. The individual responsible was never identified. As of May 2018, all of the trails on the west side of Highway 1 are open, but only a portion of one trail on the east side of Highway 1 is open to hikers.

== Gallery ==
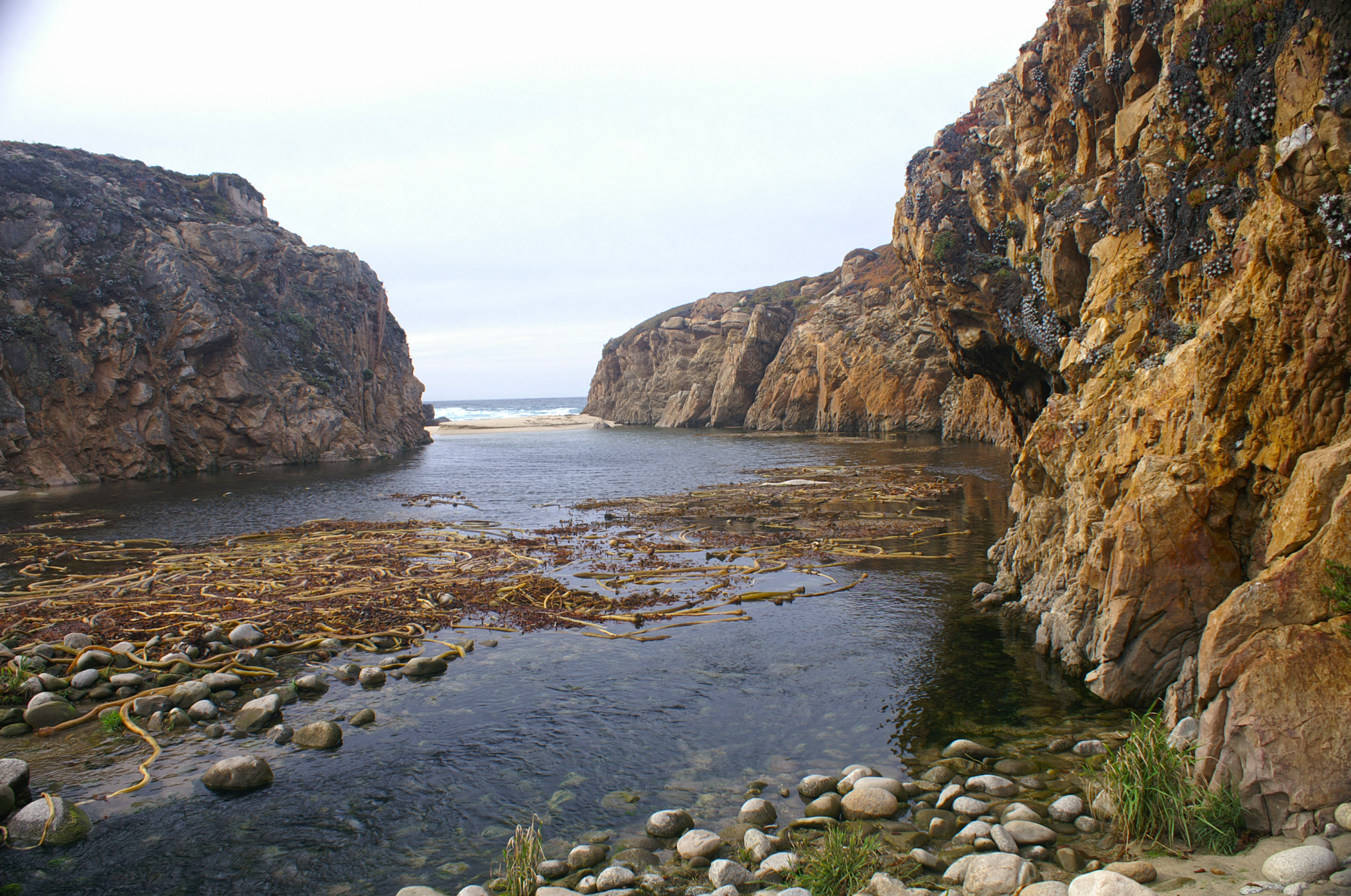
Garrapata Creek outlet

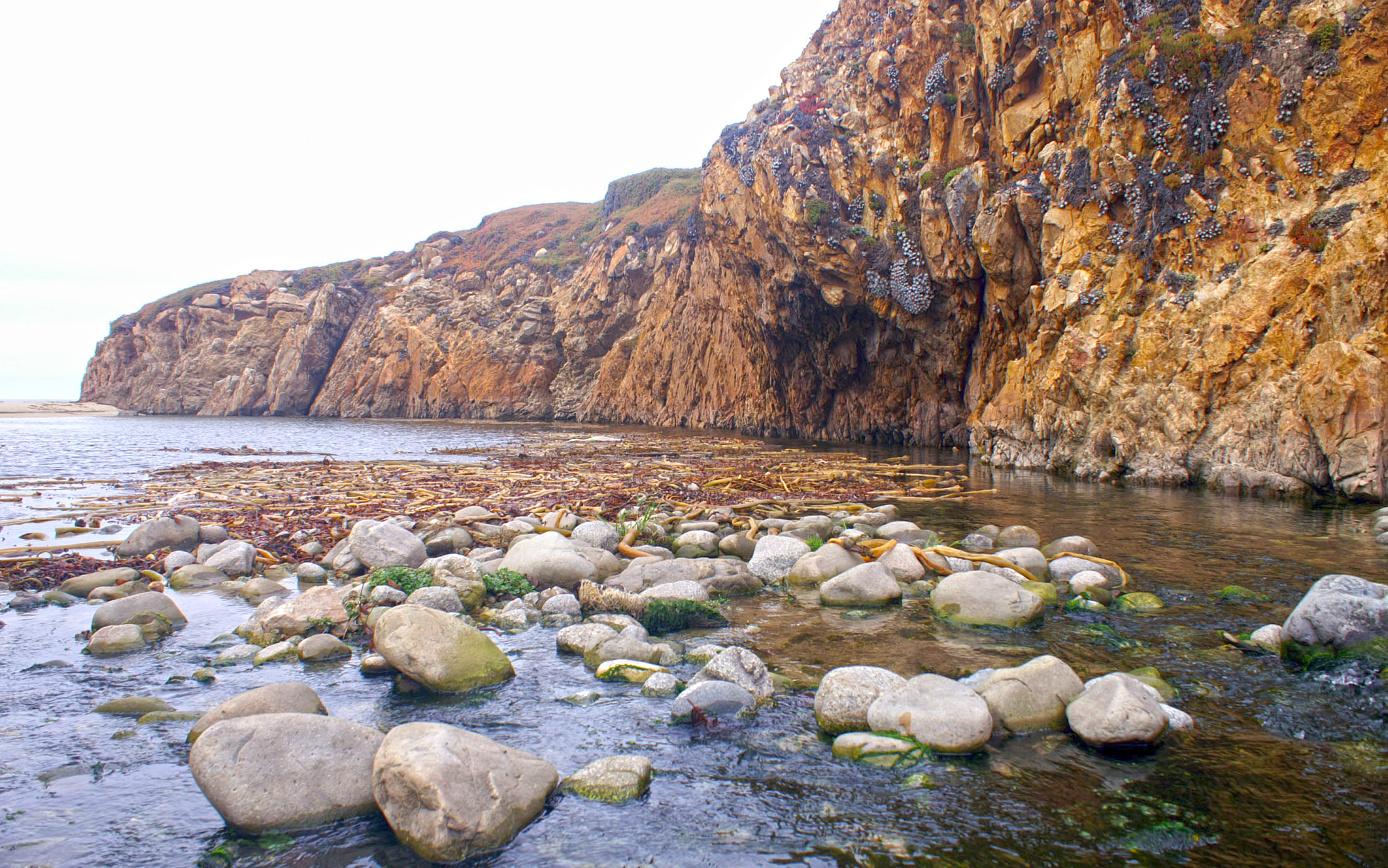
Cove at the mouth of Garrapata Creek

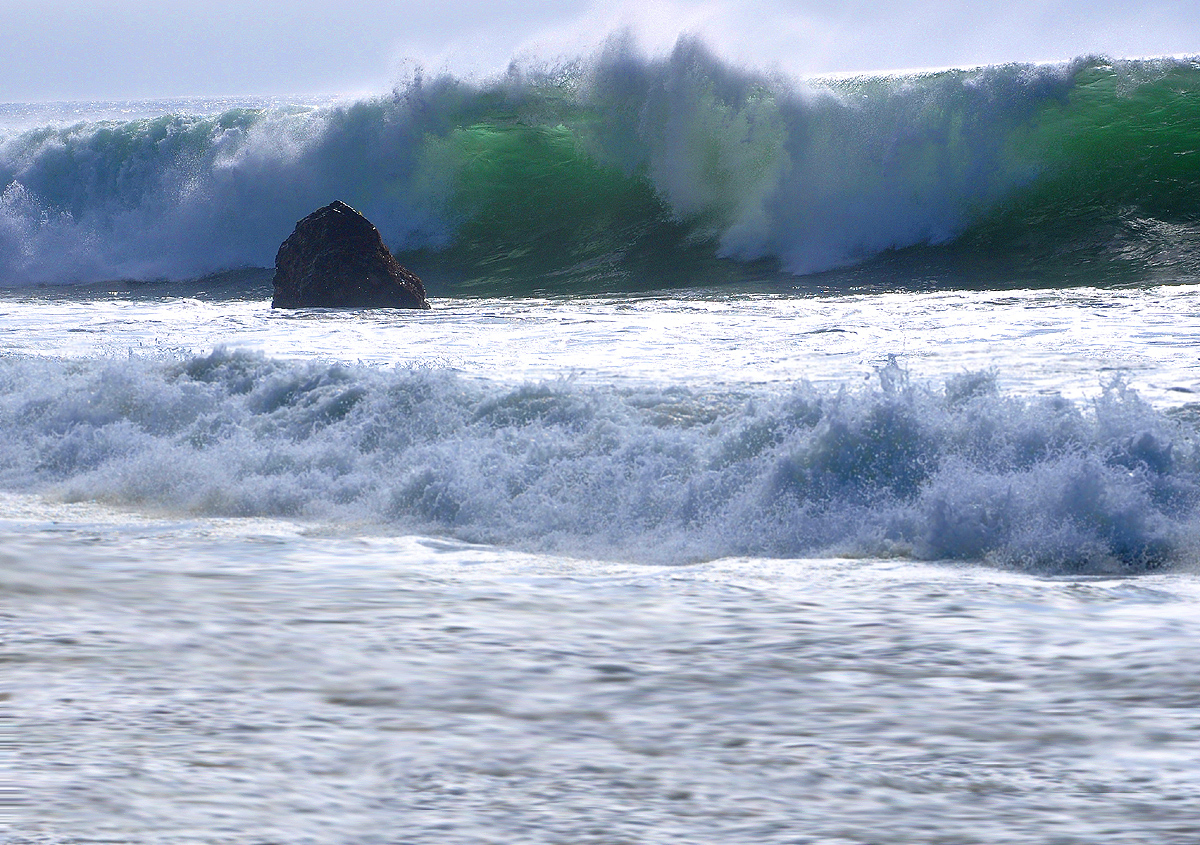
Garrapata coast is characterized by its big waves.

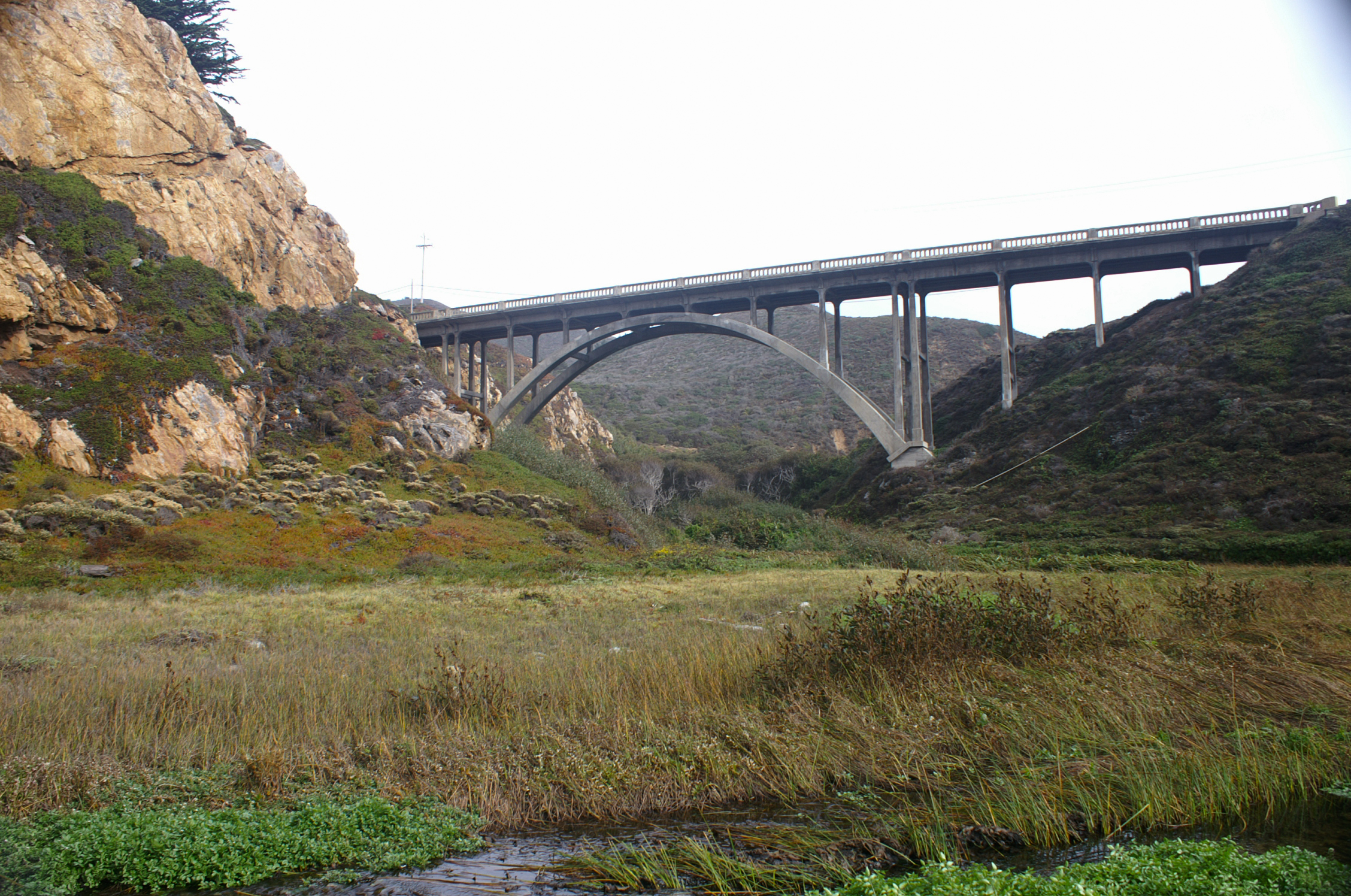
Bridge over Garrapata Creek

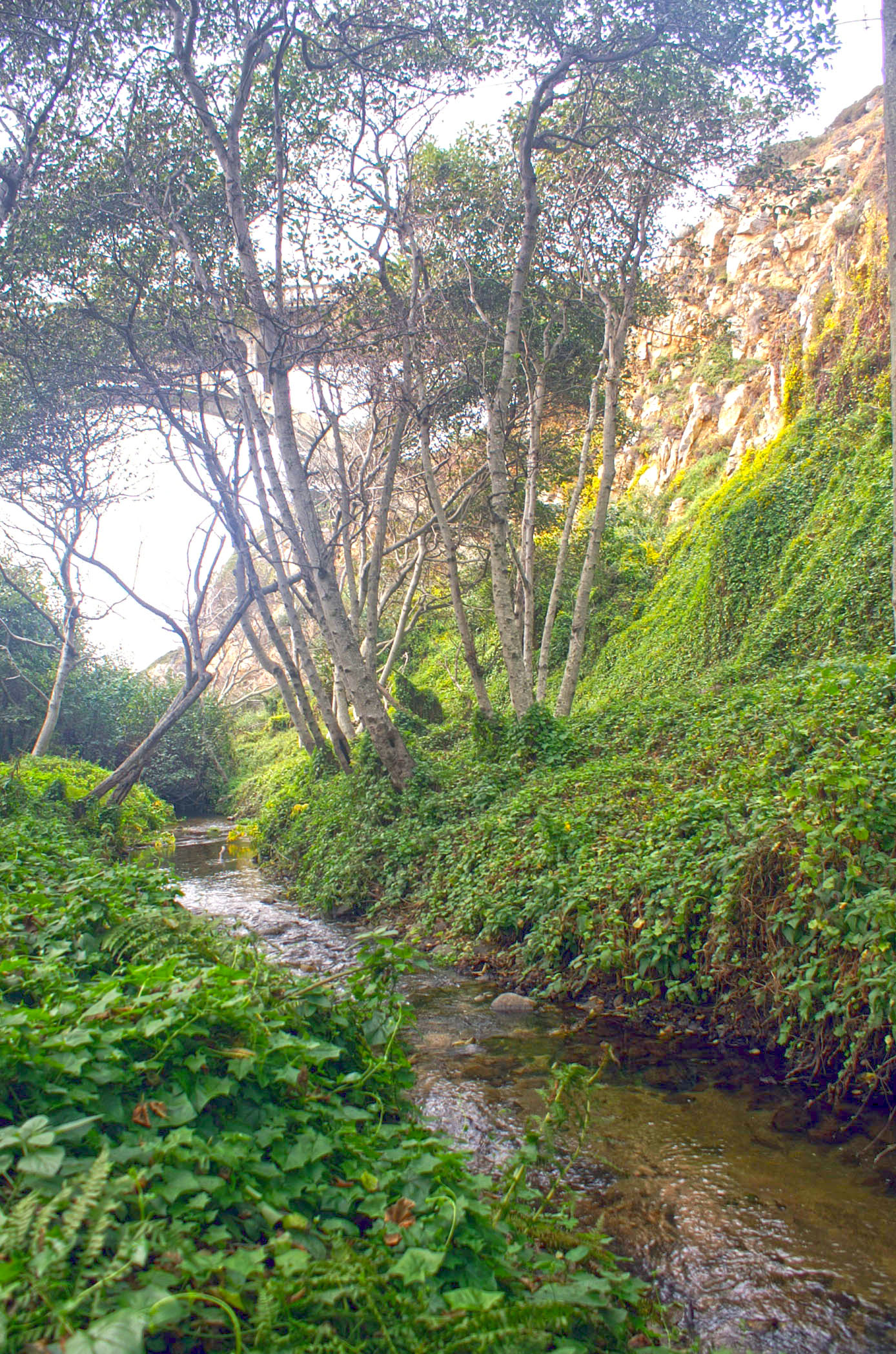
Garrapata Creek

== See also ==
- List of California state parks
