= Soberanes Fire =

2016 wildfire in Central California

- Part of the 2016 California wildfires
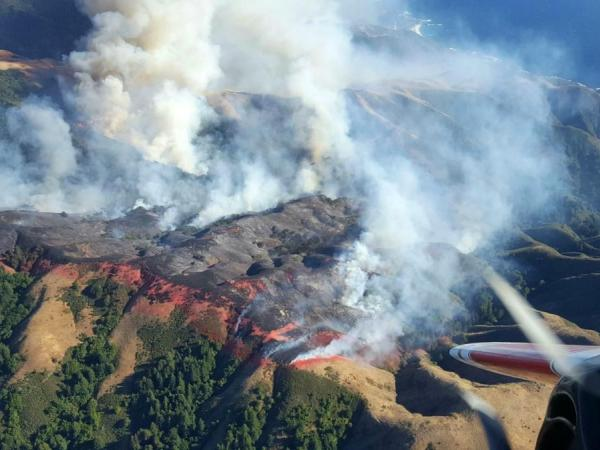
- The Soberanes Fire burning along the coastal ridge on July 25, 2016
- Date: July 22, 2016 –; October 12, 2016
- Location: Soberanes Creek, Garrapata State Park, Santa Lucia Preserve, Monterey County, California
- Coordinates: 36.46°N 121.30°W

Statistics
- Burned area: 132,127 acres (53,470 ha)
- Land use: Residential; open space

Impacts
- Deaths: 1 bulldozer operator
- Structures lost: 57 homes; 11 outbuildings
- Cost: $260 million (2016 USD)

Ignition
- Cause: Illegal campfire
- Perpetrator: Unknown

Map
- Location in Northern California

The Soberanes Fire was a large wildfire that burned from July to October 2016 in the Santa Lucia Mountains of Monterey County, California. It destroyed 57 homes and killed a bulldozer operator, and cost about $260 million to suppress, making it at the time the most expensive wildfire to fight in United States history. At the fire's peak, over 5,000 personnel were assigned to the blaze. The fire was the result of an illegal campfire in Garrapata State Park. By the time it was finally extinguished, the fire had burned 132,127 acres (53,470 ha) along the Big Sur coast in the Los Padres National Forest, Ventana Wilderness, and adjacent private and public land in Monterey County, ranking it 18th on the list of the largest California wildfires in terms of acreage burned.

== The fire ==
The final perimeter of the Soberanes Fire, October 22, 2016

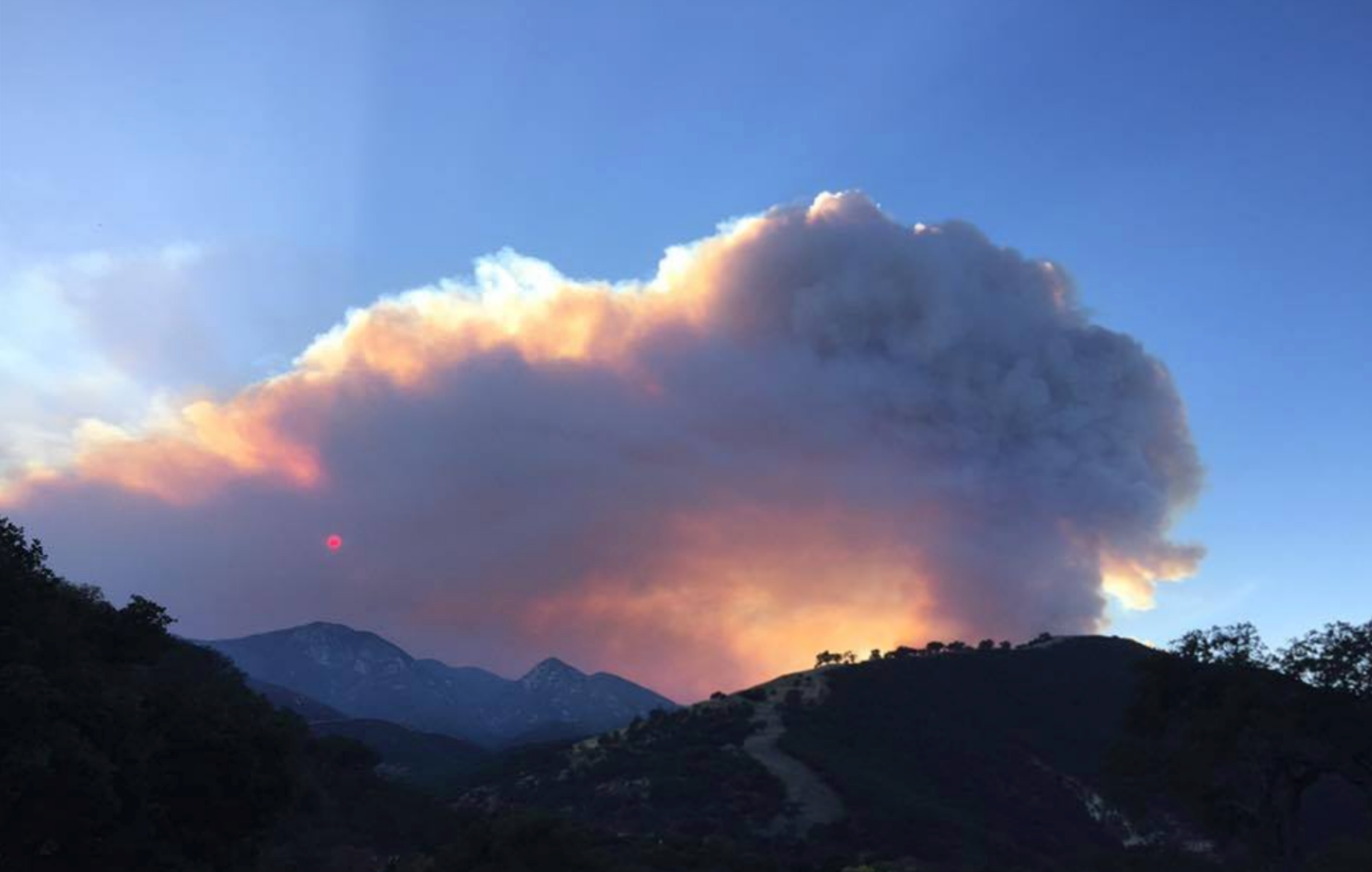
Soberanes Fire burnout operations on Chews Ridge, September 17, 2016

The fire was first reported by hikers in Garrapata State Park at 8:48 a.m. on Friday July 22, 2016, and was later determined to have started from an unattended illegal campfire. By Saturday morning, the fire had grown to 2,000 acres (810 ha) and forced the evacuation of about 300 homes in the community along Palo Colorado Canyon.

By the morning of Sunday, July 24, the fire had grown to over 10,000 acres (4,000 ha), with 5% of the fire perimeter contained. Officials said that Toro Park would be closed so that firefighters could use the area as a base camp. Evacuation warnings were also issued for all of Carmel Highlands.

On Tuesday, July 26, acting California governor Tom Torlakson declared a state of emergency in Monterey County due to the fire.

By Saturday, July 30, the fire had spread south and east into the Los Padres National Forest.

Almost a month later, on August 26, the fire had grown to over 90,000 acres (36,000 ha) and was only 60% contained. The majority of the fire by then was within the Los Padres National Forest and the Ventana Wilderness, and unified command of the fire suppression work was transferred from the California Department of Forestry and Fire Protection to the United States Forest Service's Alaska Interagency Incident Management Team.

By September 18, the fire had increased in size to 113,260 acres (45,830 ha). Containment was still only at 61%, and 1,921 firefighters were at work. Some evacuation orders on the northern perimeter had been lifted, and crews were working on burnout operations to establish a containment line on the northeast side of the fire, near Chews Ridge. Heavy smoke resulted from the burnouts. As of 23 September 2016 the costs to fight the fire exceeded $200 million, making it the most expensive fire suppression effort in United States history at the time.

By October 9, the fire had burned 132,127 acres (53,470 ha) and was 99% contained. Incident management personnel expected to attain full containment by October 15. Fire personnel had been reduced to 704 workers, with many engaged in fire suppression repair efforts. On October 28, three months after the wildfire had started, fire management personnel reported that the fire was 100% contained, and that remaining smoldering hotspots would be put out by rains expected shortly afterward. By that time, restoration crews had completed suppression repair work on 374 miles (602 km) of the fire line.

== Damage, deaths and injuries ==
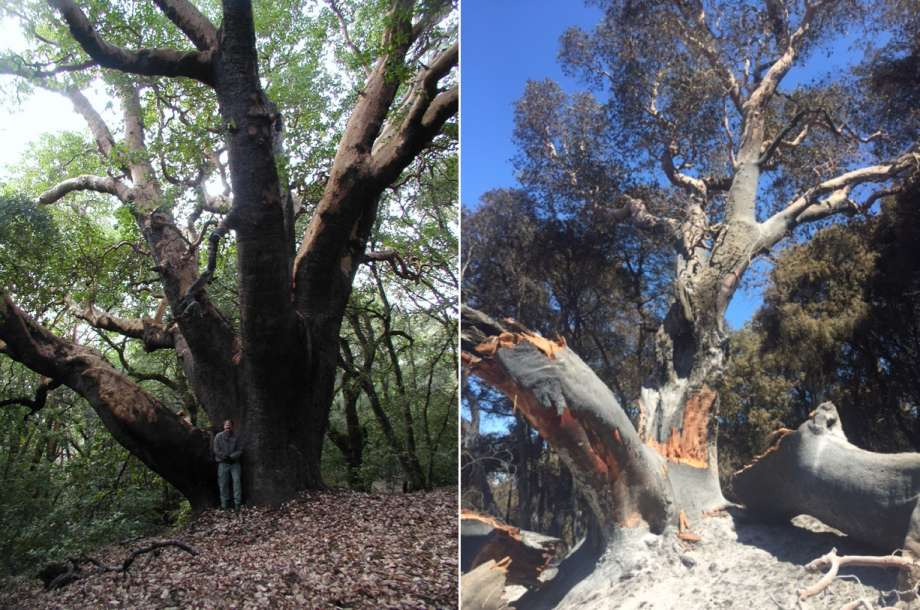
The largest madrone in the United States was burned and possibly killed by the 2016 Soberanes Fire.

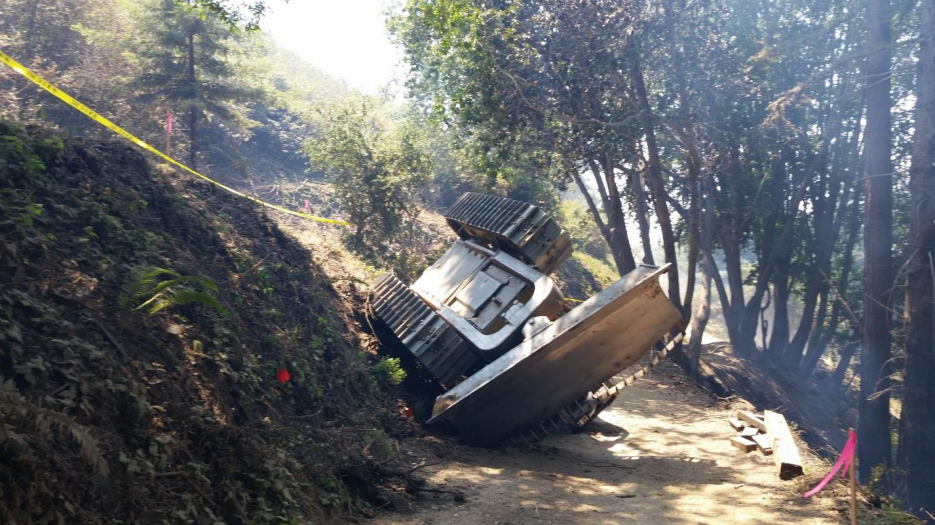
Bulldozer operator Robert Reagan, 35, of Fresno County, died July 26, 2016, when his bulldozer overturned while he was building a fire line near Palo Colorado Canyon in Big Sur.

The fire destroyed 57 homes and 11 outbuildings in the Garrapata Canyon and Palo Colorado Canyon areas during the first three weeks. Robert Baird, supervisor of the Los Padres National Forest, estimated that firefighters saved US$6.8 billion worth of real estate.

The fire burned and possibly killed the largest Pacific madrone tree in the United States, within the Joshua Creek Canyon Ecological Reserve. The tree was 125 feet (38 m) tall and more than 25 feet (7.6 m) in circumference. The madrone was listed on the American Forests National Big Tree list in 2003, a register of the biggest trees by species in the United States.

The California Department of Parks and Recreation announced on September 28, 2016, that Garrapata State Park east of Highway 1, where the fire started, would remain closed through the winter.

=== Legal actions ===
On Tuesday, July 26, at 11:00 PM, Robert Oliver Reagan, an on-call bulldozer operator contracted by Czirban Concrete Construction to CalFire, was killed when his bulldozer rolled over, pinning him, while he was maneuvering around a fire truck on a steep slope in the Palo Colorado Canyon area.

In March 2017, Reagan's widow filed a wrongful death suit against the state of California for her husband's death while fighting the fire. They later dropped the suit due to a law that gives the state immunity from wrongful death lawsuits.

In April 2017, Czirban Concrete Construction, the contractor by whom Reagan was employed, was fined $20,000 for failing to report the fatality, failing to require seat belts on the equipment, failing to warn employees of the applicable hazards, and other offenses. Ian Czirban, the head of the company, was also charged by Monterey County prosecutors with six felonies for tax evasion and insurance fraud, and a misdemeanor charge for failing to maintain workers' compensation insurance. Czirban disputed the fines and charges, saying that he was not Reagan's employer and did not own the equipment at issue. He entered a plea of "not guilty" on May 11, 2017. In October 2019, Czirban was found guilty of two counts of willfully failing to file a payroll tax return, one count of not having a workers' compensation insurance policy, and one count of filing a false document. He was convicted and sentenced to 300 days of home confinement and three years of felony probation for violating state labor laws.

Another company, Industrial Defense Development, was fined $6,000 for injuries that another firefighter sustained when the water truck he was driving rolled over an embankment.

== Cause ==
On August 2, 2016, officials announced that their investigation found that the fire had been caused by an unattended illegal campfire. While no suspect was identified, Monterey County District Attorney Dean Flippo said that, if an arrest were made, the culprit could be charged with negligence and manslaughter.

== See also ==
- 2016 California wildfires
- Wildfire suppression
- Aerial firefighting
