= Big Sur Coast Highway =

Scenic section of California State Route 1

Big Sur Coast Highway
- Cabrillo–San Simeon Highway; Roosevelt Highway

Route information
- Maintained by Caltrans
- Length: 71.2 mi (114.6 km)
- Status: As of Jan 2026: fully open
- Known for: Scenic views
- Tourist routes: Route One, Big Sur Coast Highway
- Restrictions: No trucks exceeding 30 feet kingpin to rearmost axle distance (Rio Rd to San Simeon)

Major junctions
- South end: SR 1 at the San Carpóforo Creek in San Luis Obispo County
- North end: SR 1 at the Malpaso Creek near Carmel Highlands

Location
- Country: United States
- State: California
- Counties: San Luis Obispo, Monterey

Highway system
- State highways in California; Interstate; US; State; Scenic; History; Pre‑1964; Unconstructed; Deleted; Freeways

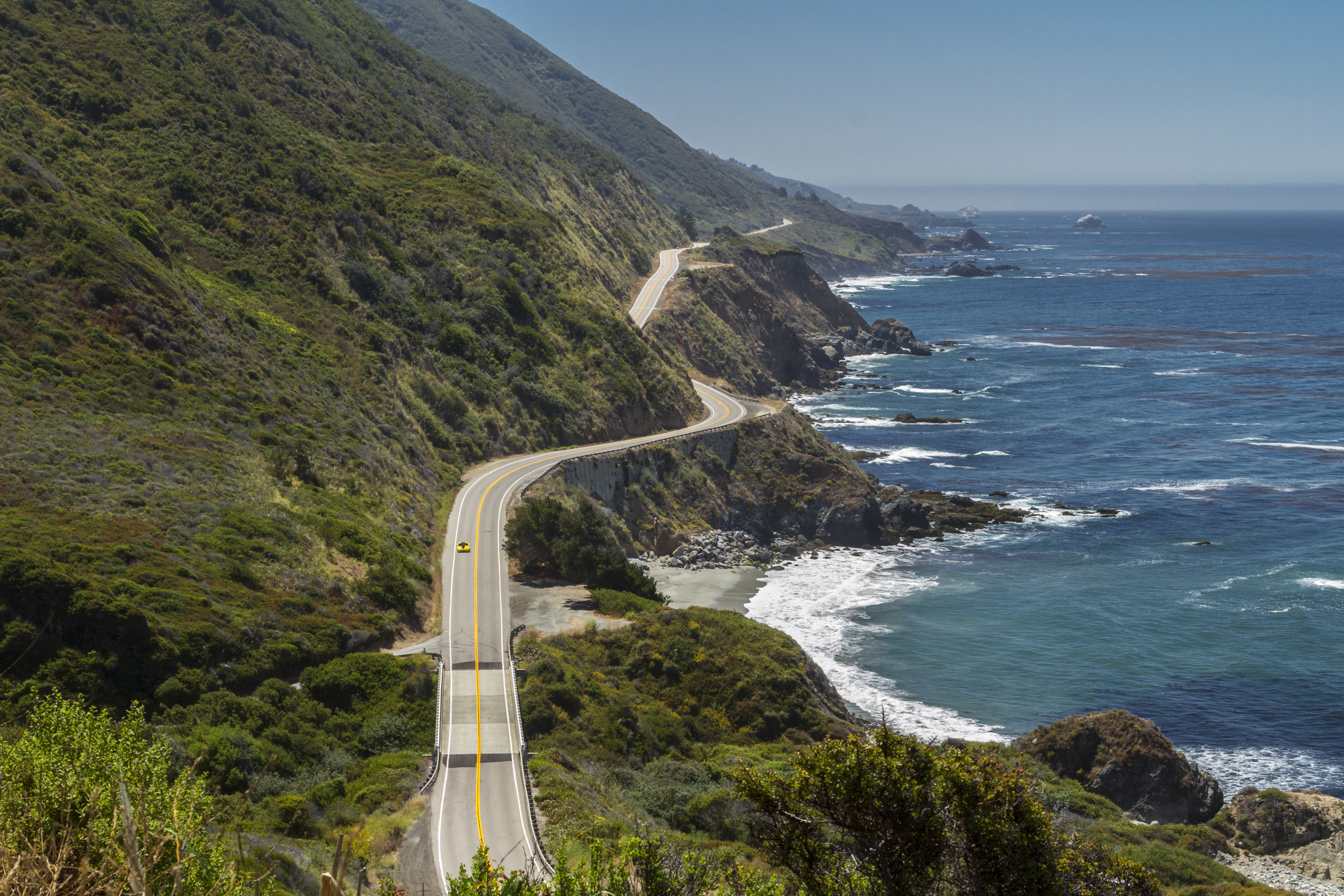
Highway 1 near Ragged Point at the southern end of the Big Sur region

Big Sur Coast Highway is a section of California State Route 1 through the Big Sur region of California that is widely considered to be one of the most scenic driving routes in the United States, if not the world. It is both a National Scenic Byway and a California Scenic Highway, and was described by Australian painter Francis McComas as the "greatest meeting of land and water in the world". The winding, narrow road, often cut into the face of towering seaside cliffs, is a "symbolic image" of Big Sur. Condé Nast Traveler named State Route 1 through Big Sur one of the top ten world-famous streets, comparable to Broadway in New York City and the Champs-Élysées in Paris. The road itself is a destination for visitors.

The Big Sur portion of Highway 1 is generally considered to include the 71-mile (114 km) segment adjoining the unincorporated region of Big Sur between Malpaso Creek near Carmel Highlands in the north and San Carpóforo Creek near San Simeon in the south.

Prior to its completion, the California coast south of Carmel and north of San Simeon was one of the most remote regions in the state, rivaling at the time nearly any other region in the United States for its difficult access. In 1920, the 26 mi (42 km) trip from Carmel to the Pfeiffer Ranch in the Big Sur valley on the Old Coast Road in a light spring wagon pulled by two horses could be completed in about 11 hours, while a lumber wagon pulled by four horses could make the same trip in 13 hours. The rough road ended in present-day Posts and could be impassible in winter. No road existed beyond Posts, only a horseback trail connecting the homesteads to the south.

The highway was first proposed by Dr. John L. D. Roberts, a physician who was summoned on April 21, 1894, to treat survivors of the wreck of the 493 tons (447 t) S.S. Los Angeles (originally USRC Wayanda), which had run aground near the Point Sur Light Station about 25 miles (40 km) south of Carmel-by-the-Sea. It took him 3 1/2 hours on his two-wheeled, horse-drawn cart, a very fast trip for the day. The initial survey for the highway was completed in 1918, and its construction began in 1921. The project ceased for two years in 1926 when funding ran out, and after 18 years of construction, the Carmel–San Simeon Highway was completed in 1937. The route was incorporated into the state highway system and re-designated as Highway 1 in 1939.

The highway has been closed frequently by landslides, including a 3 year closure from 2023 to 2026. It reopened fully as of January 2026.

== History ==
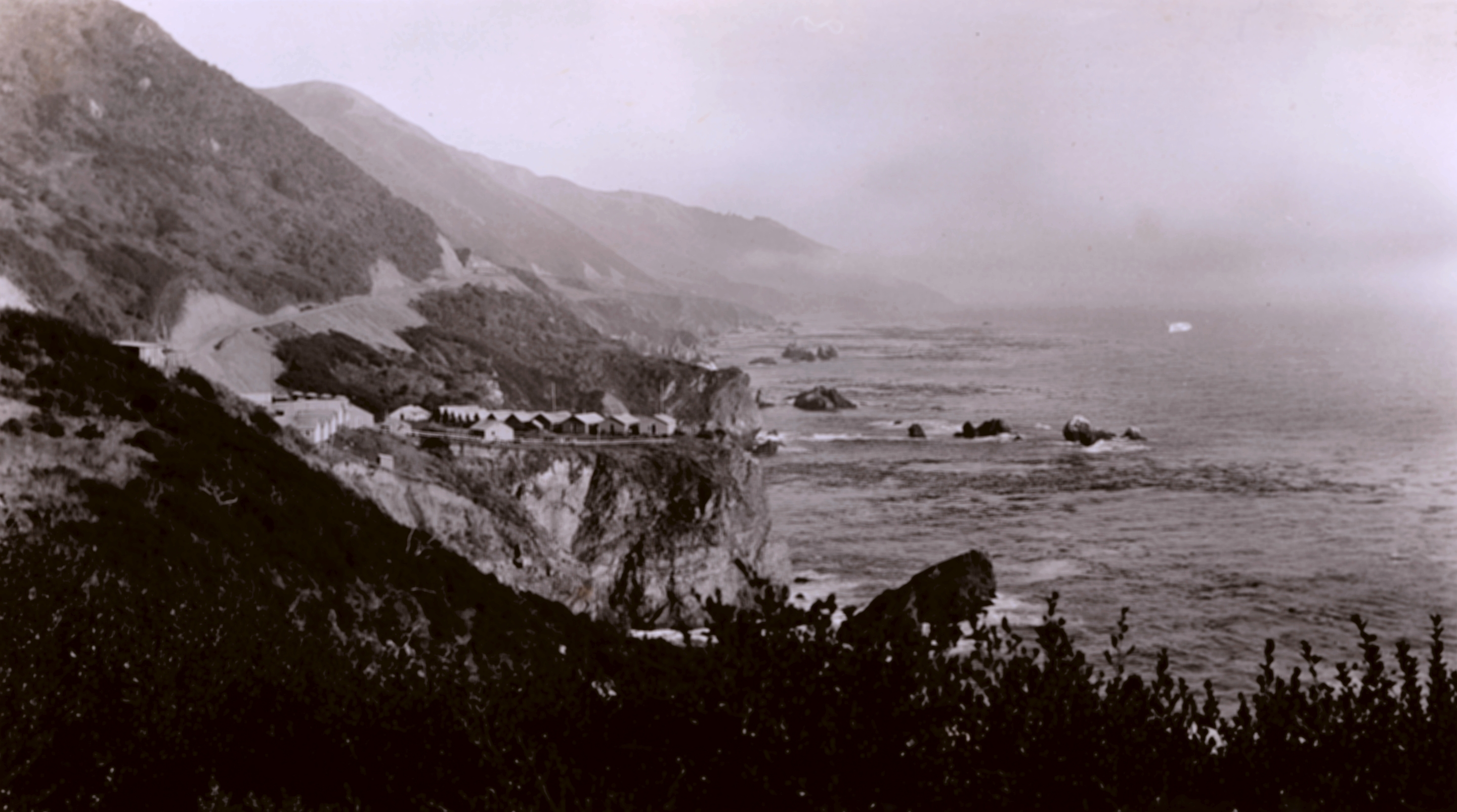
Convict labor from Folsom Prison was paid 35 cents per day to help build the roadway.

Governor Juan Alvarado granted Rancho San Jose y Sur Chiquito, including the land from Carmel to near Palo Colorado Canyon, to José Castro in about 1848. Castro documented a trail from Monterey to Palo Colorado Canyon used by Native Americans when he filed a map of his purchase in 1853. When the region was first settled by European immigrants in 1853, it was the United States' "last frontier".

After California gained statehood, the trail from Carmel to Mill Creek (present-day Bixby Canyon) was declared a public road by the county in 1855. But the California coast south of Carmel and north of San Simeon remained one of the most remote regions in the state, rivaling at the time nearly any other region in the United States for its difficult access. It remained largely an untouched wilderness until early in the twentieth century.

Yankee businessman Charles Henry Bixby bought several hundred acres south of Mill Creek and harvested lumber, tanbark, and lime. Without a road, he resorted to using a landing chute and hoist to transfer the goods to steamers anchored offshore.

Bixby tried to persuade the county to build a road to Bixby Creek, but they refused, replying that "no one would want to live there". In 1870, Bixby and his father hired men to improve the track and constructed the first wagon road including 23 bridges from the Carmel Mission to Bixby Creek.

Further south, the Rancho El Sur grant extended from the mouth of Little Sur River inland about 2.5 miles (4.0 km) over the coastal mountains and south along the coast past the mouth of the Big Sur River to Cooper's Point. It was largely a cattle operation. There was a brief industrial boom in the late 19th century, but the early decades of the twentieth century passed with few changes, and Big Sur remained a nearly inaccessible wilderness.

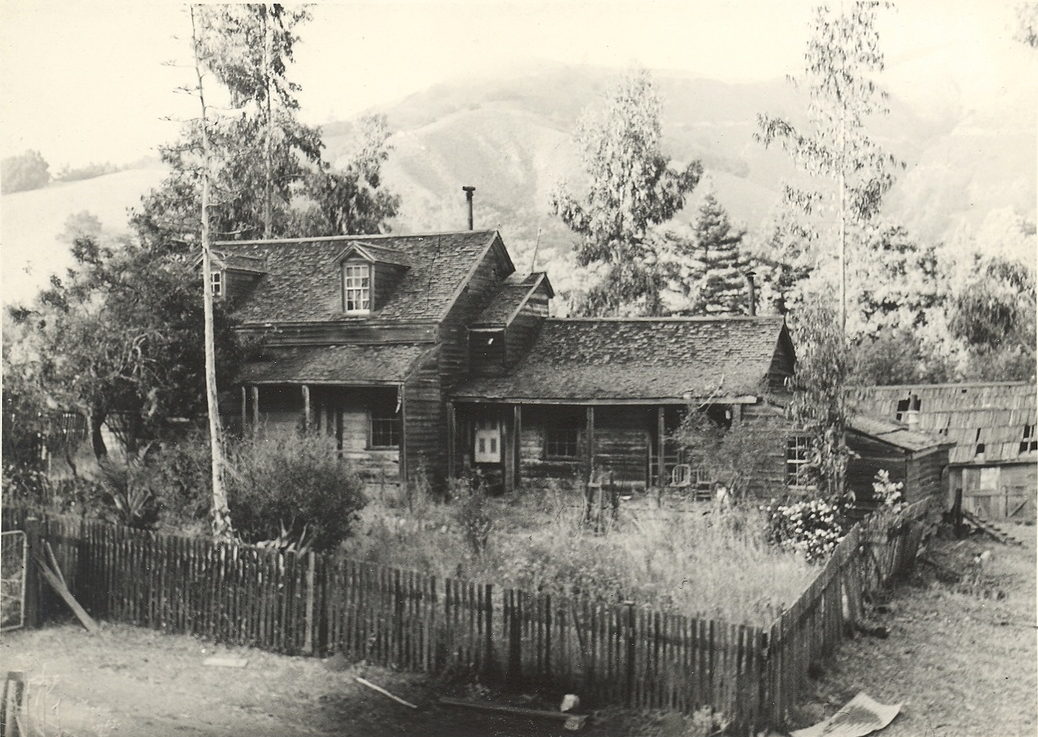
William W. Post built a home in Big Sur in 1867 when he was foreman on the Soberanes Rancho. It is a historical landmark today.

In 1886, Bixby partnered with William W. Post and they improved and realigned what became known as the Old Coast Road south to Post's ranch near Sycamore Canyon. At Bixby Creek Canyon, the road was necessarily built 11 miles (18 km) inland to circumvent the deep canyon. The road from Bixby Canyon climbed steep Cerro Hill and crossed the Little Sur River where its two forks diverted. The road entered the Cooper Ranch (formerly Rancho El Sur) and continued south about 7 miles (11 km) south to the Pfeiffer Ranch. In 1920, the 26 mi (42 km) trip from Carmel in a light spring wagon pulled by two horses could be completed in about 11 hours. A lumber wagon pulled by four horses could make the trip in 13 hours. Bixby obtained a patent on April 10, 1889, for 160 acres (65 ha) south of Mill Creek.

In 1891, visitor C. A. Canfield wrote about how a trip on the mail wagon from Monterey to Posts took most of a day, where he remained the night. The next day he rode horseback over the South Coast Road with Thomas B. Slate. They reached Slates Hot Springs at about 5pm. The single-lane road was closed in winter when it became impassable. Due to the steep and narrow road, even during the summer Coast residents would receive supplies via boat from Monterey or San Francisco. Due to the limited access, settlement was primarily concentrated near the Big Sur River and present-day Lucia, and individual settlements along a 25 miles (40 km) stretch of coast between the two. The northern and southern regions of the coast were isolated from one another.

In 1900, the country improved the road south to the forks of the Little Sur River. Charles Howland, who drove the mail stage between Monterey and Big Sur, built the Idlewild Hotel in about 1900 on the Old Coast Road where it crossed the Little Sur River. The Pfeiffer family's hospitality was enjoyed by friends and strangers alike for years. They finally began charging guests in 1910, naming it Pfeiffer's Ranch Resort. It and the Idlewild Hotel were the earliest places to stay.

In 1909, an advertisement for the Idlewild Hotel on the Little Sur River stated that the camp would be accessible by auto as soon as the "Cerro Grade", the stretch of road from the coast to the Little Sur River near Cerro Hill, was completed. In 1910, the Monterey Daily Cypress reported that Mr. and Mrs. A.E. Cooper "motored down to Mrs. Martha M. Cooper ranch at Sur, leaving Monterey at 12 midnight and arriving there at 2 a.m." But the road was still very rough, and most goods including cheese produced on the Cooper Ranch was still shipped by boat to Monterey. The Idlewild competed with the Pfeiffer Resort for guests through about 1920, when the Idlewild was forced out of business by Martha Cooper, who acquired the land. In 1904, residents extended the unpaved road from the Pfeiffer Resort to the Post Ranch, and then it was extended another 2.5 miles (4.0 km) south to Castro Canyon, near the present-day location of Deetjen's Big Sur Inn.

As late as the 1920s, only two homes in the entire region had electricity, locally generated by water wheels and windmills. Most of the population lived without power until connections to the California electric grid were established in the early 1950s. The region has always been relatively difficult to access and only the sturdiest and most self-sufficient settlers stayed.

In July 1937, the California Highways and Public Works department described the journey, "There was a narrow, winding, steep road from Carmel south ... approximately 35 miles to the Big Sur River. From that point south to San Simeon, it could only be traveled by horseback or on foot." The southern portion, which was for many years merely a foot and horse trail, became known as the "Coast Ridge Road". It used to begin near the Old Post Ranch. It is currently only accessible on foot from near the Ventana Inn. It passes through private land and connects with the Nacimiento-Fergusson Road. It follows the crest of the coastal ridge south about 34 miles (55 km) to within a couple of miles of Cone Peak. Both the Old Coast Road and the Coast Ridge Road are often unusable during and after winter storms.

The southern region of Monterey County coast was isolated from the few settlements in the north by the steep terrain. The southern homesteaders were more closely tied to the people in the interior San Antonio Valley including the Jolon and Lockwood areas than to coastal communities to the north. Those who lived in the vicinity of the Big Sur River were connected with Monterey to the north.

A horse trail connected Jolon through present-day Fort Hunter Liggett to Wagon Caves, and from there over the Santa Lucia range, from which two trails split to the coast or to the Los Burros Mining District.

The horse trail across the mountains was widened and improved into a road beginning in 1931, and completed in 1937. The road was constructed by crews composed of men from the Civilian Conservation Corp, U.S. Forest Service, and state and county relief agencies.

=== Highway proposed ===
On April 21, 1894, Dr. John L. D. Roberts, a physician and land speculator who had founded Seaside, California and resided on the Monterey Peninsula, was summoned to assist treating survivors of the wreck of the 493 tons (447 t) S.S. Los Angeles (originally USRC Wayanda), which had run aground near the Point Sur Light Station about 25 miles (40 km) south of Carmel-by-the-Sea. The ride on his two-wheeled, horse-drawn cart took him 3 1/2 hours, a very fast trip for the day.

In 1897, he walked the entire stretch of rocky coast from Monterey to San Luis Obispo in five days and mapped out a course of the future road. He photographed the land and became the first surveyor of the route. He became convinced of the need for a road along the coast to San Simeon, which he believed could be built for $50,000 (equivalent to $1,149,554 in 2025). In 1915, he presented the results of his survey and photographic work to a joint session of the California legislature. Roberts initially promoted the coastal highway to allow access to a region of spectacular beauty, but failed to obtain funding.

=== Funding ===
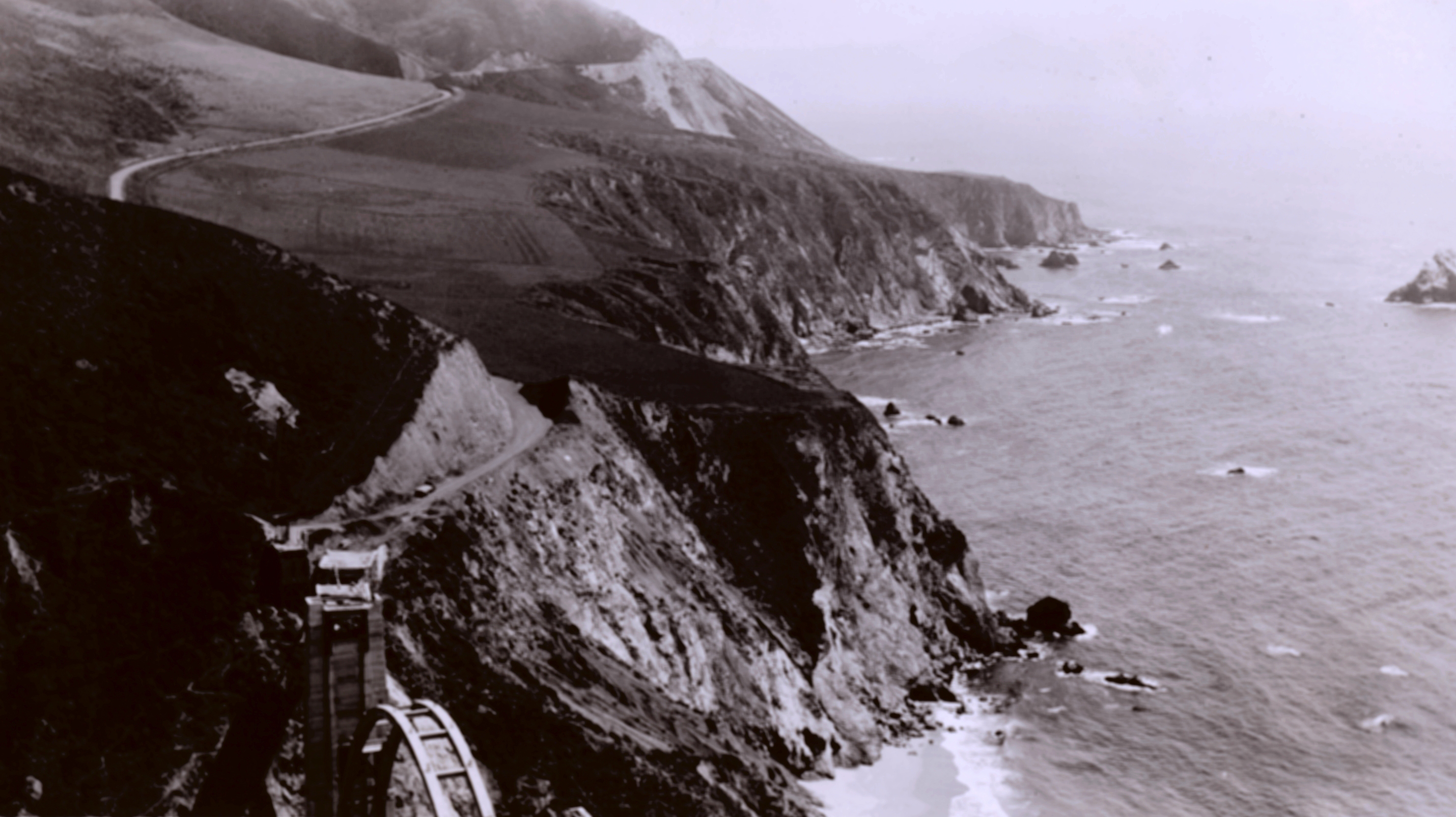
Bixby Canyon Bridge under construction in 1932

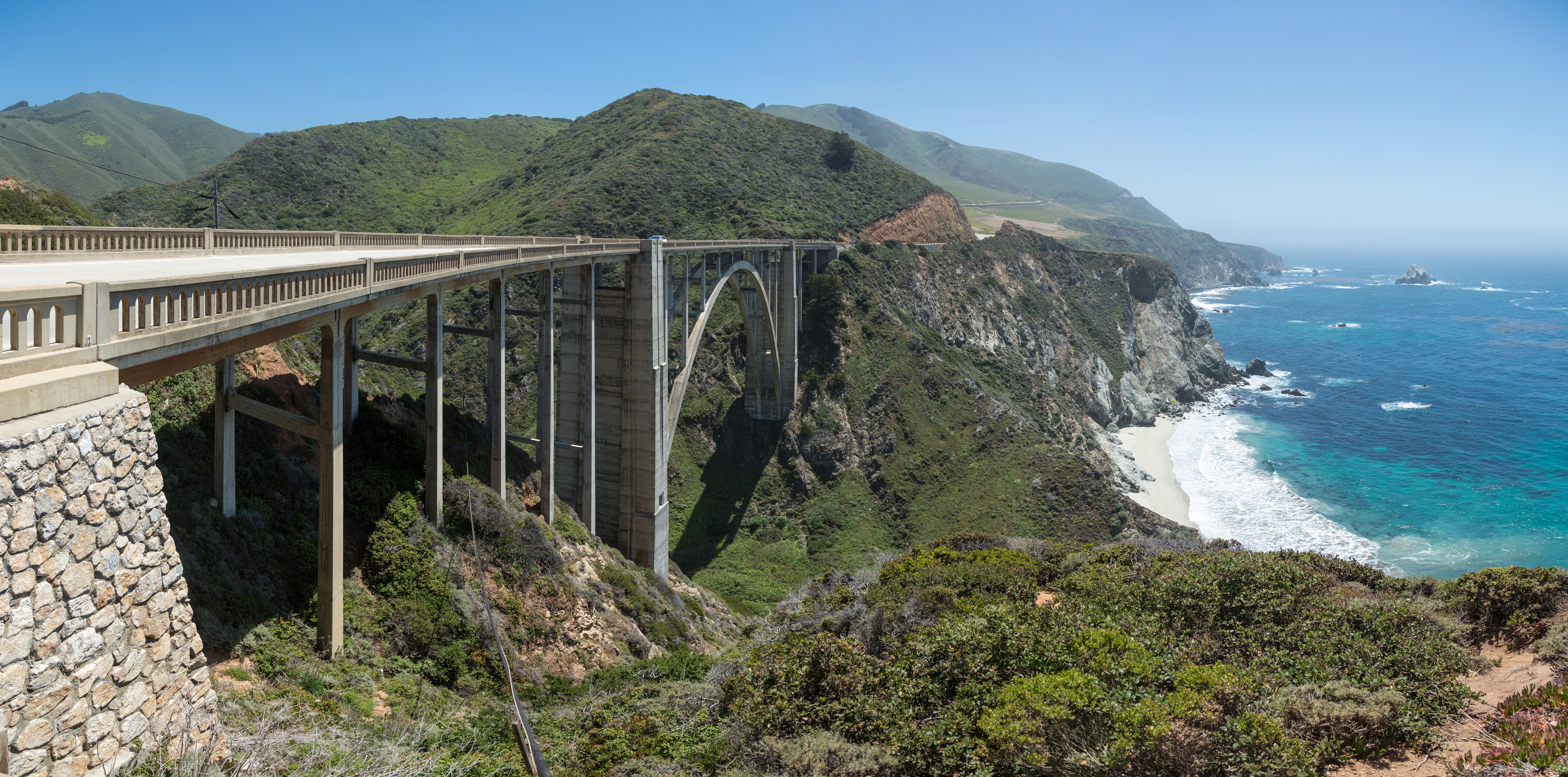
Bixby Creek Bridge, May 2013

California was booming during the 1920s, driven by rapidly expanding aviation, oil, and agricultural business. The number of state residents doubled between 1910 and 1930. This stimulated the rapid expansion of the state's road network. State Senator Elmer S. Rigdon from Cambria, at the southern end of the Big Sur region, embraced the necessity of building the road. He was a member of the California Senate Committee on Roads and Highways and promoted the military necessity of defending California's coast which persuaded the legislature to approve the project. In 1919, the legislature approved building Route 56, or the Carmel – San Simeon Highway, to connect Big Sur to the rest of California. A $1.5 million bond issue was approved by voters, but construction was delayed by World War I. Federal funds were appropriated and in 1921 voters approved additional state funds. Additional funds were made available from the National Industrial Recovery Act in June 1933. California received $15 million for state highway work.

== Construction ==
The California state legislature passed a law in 1915 that allowed the state to use convict labor under the control of the State Board of Prison Directors and prison guards. In 1918, state highway engineer Lester Gibson led a mule pack train along the Big Sur coast to complete an initial survey to locate the future Coast Highway. When the convict labor law was revised in 1921, it gave control of the convicts and camps to the Division of Highways, although control and discipline remained with the State Board of Prison Directors and guards. The law helped the contractors who had a difficult time attracting labor to work in remote regions of the state.

=== 1921-1924 ===
The first contract was awarded in 1921. The contractor Blake and Heaney built a prison labor camp for 120 prisoners and 20 paid laborers at Piedras Blancas Light Station. They began work on 12 miles (19 km) of road between Piedras Blancas Light Station near San Simeon and Salmon Creek. Most of the road lay within San Luis Obispo County. As they progressed, the work camp was moved 9 miles (14 km) north to Willow Creek and then another 10 miles (16 km) north to Kirk Creek. When the section to Salmon Creek was completed, the crew began work on the road north toward Big Creek.

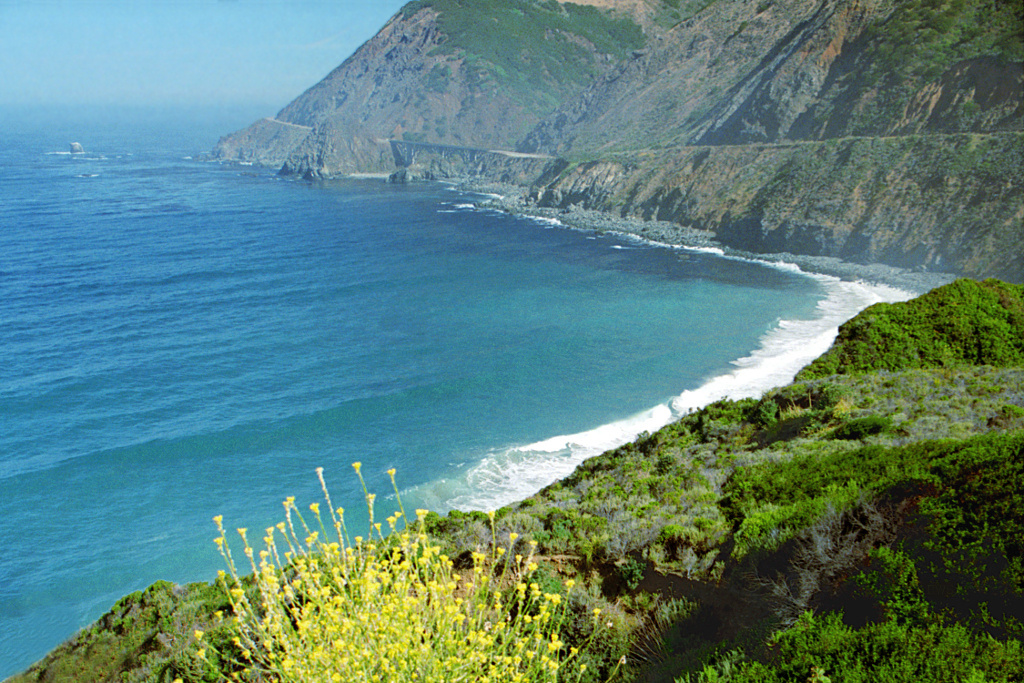
Looking north toward Big Creek Bridge with Landels-Hill Big Creek Reserve above the highway

Contractor George Pollock Company of Sacramento started construction next on one of the most remote segments, a 13 miles (21 km) stretch between Anderson Canyon and Big Sur in September 1922. The region was so remote and access so poor that the company brought most of its supplies and equipment in by barge at a sheltered cove near the middle of the project. Machines were hoisted to the road level using steam-powered donkey engines.

Construction required extensive excavation utilizing steam shovels and explosives on the extremely steep slopes. The work was dangerous, and accidents and earth slides were common. One or more accidents were reported nearly every week. Equipment was frequently damaged and lost. In one incident, a steam shovel fell more than 500 feet (150 m) into the ocean and was destroyed.

Overcoming all the difficulties, the crews completed two portions of the highway in October 1924, the southern section from San Simeon to Salmon Creek and a second segment from the Big Sur Village south to Anderson Creek. When these sections were completed, the contractor had used up all of the available funds and work was halted.

California Governor Friend William Richardson felt the state could not afford to complete the 30 miles (48 km) remaining, including the most difficult section remaining between Salmon Creek and Anderson Canyon.

=== 1928-1937 ===
In March 1928, work was renewed. Convicts were paid $2.10 per day but the cost of clothing, food, medical attention, toilet articles, transportation to the camp, construction tools, and even their guards was deducted from their pay. Actual wages were just under $0.34 per day. If a convict escaped, the law provided for a reward of $200 for their capture and return. The reward was also automatically deducted from the convict's pay.

San Quentin State Prison set up three temporary prison camps to provide unskilled convict labor to help with road construction. The first was built in March 1928 near Salmon Creek for 120 prisoners and 20 free men. They worked north toward Big Creek, about 46 miles (74 km) south of Carmel.

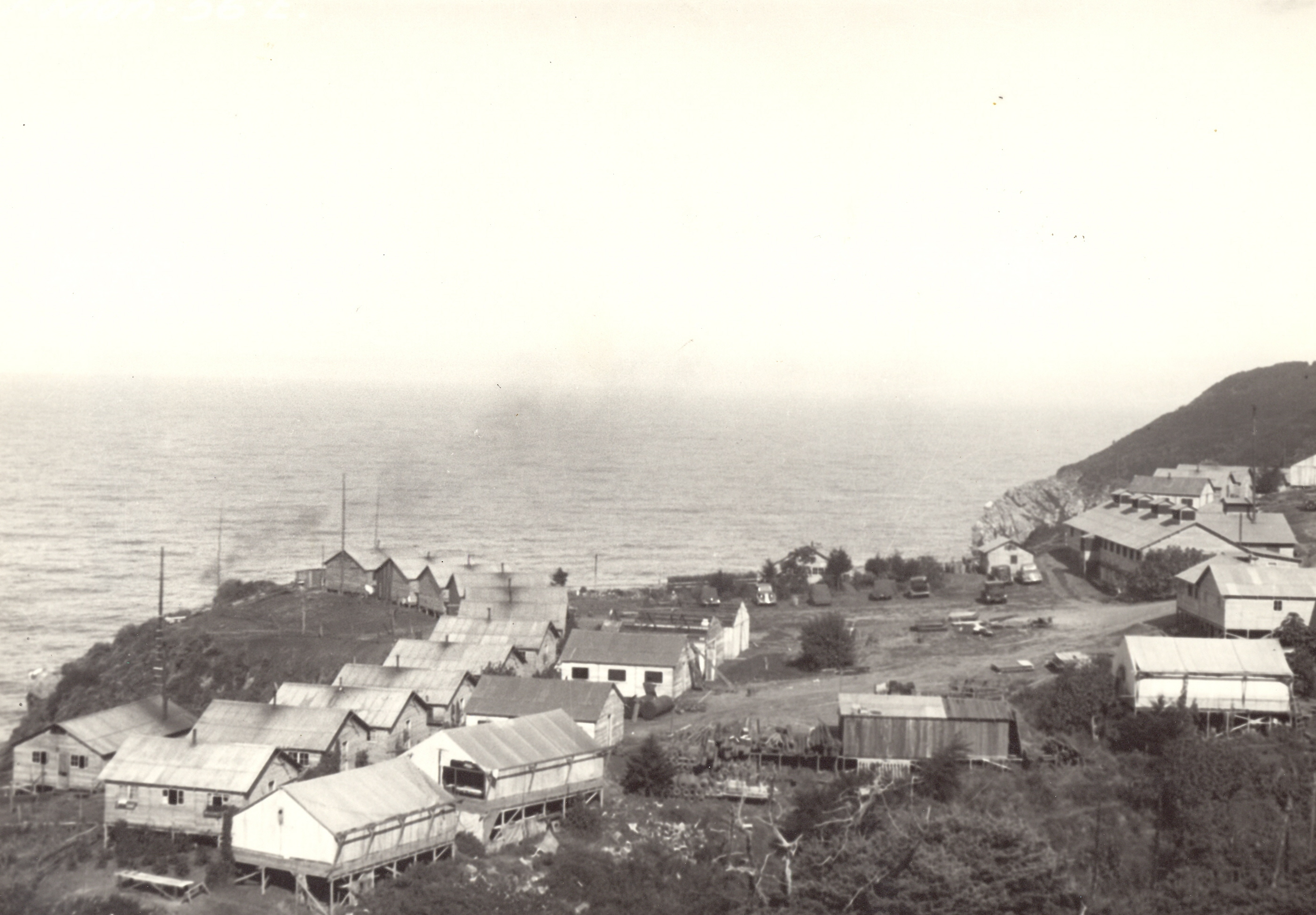
Anderson Canyon labor camp

In July 1928, a second camp was built near the mouth of the Little Sur River on the El Sur Ranch about 18 miles (29 km) south of Carmel. They worked on an 8 miles (13 km) section of the highway from 9 miles (14 km) to the south, to Rocky Creek, about 4 miles (6.4 km) to the north. When they completed this portion in 1932, the contractor moved the work camp south to Anderson Creek. From this camp, they built the road south 7 miles (11 km) south to Big Creek. When this task was finished, the workers almost completely reconstructed and realigned the portion of the road from Anderson Creek to Big Sur that had been completed in 1924. Two and three shifts of convicts and free men worked every day, using four large steam shovels. Locals, including writer John Steinbeck, also worked on the road.

=== Construction methods ===
Walt Trotter, a long-time resident of the coast who had many years of experience in construction, observed in 1978 that the road could have been better built. "Had this been a modern constructed way", he said, "it would have been all infilled, tailgated, the brush would have been cleared off all the cuts, they would have taken the dozers and gone down and compacted all the fill." Still, looking at a picture of the construction, he said, "Then they would have started up here at the top of the hill and made nice slopes all the way down and benched it down and you wouldn't have had all this..."

=== Bridges required ===
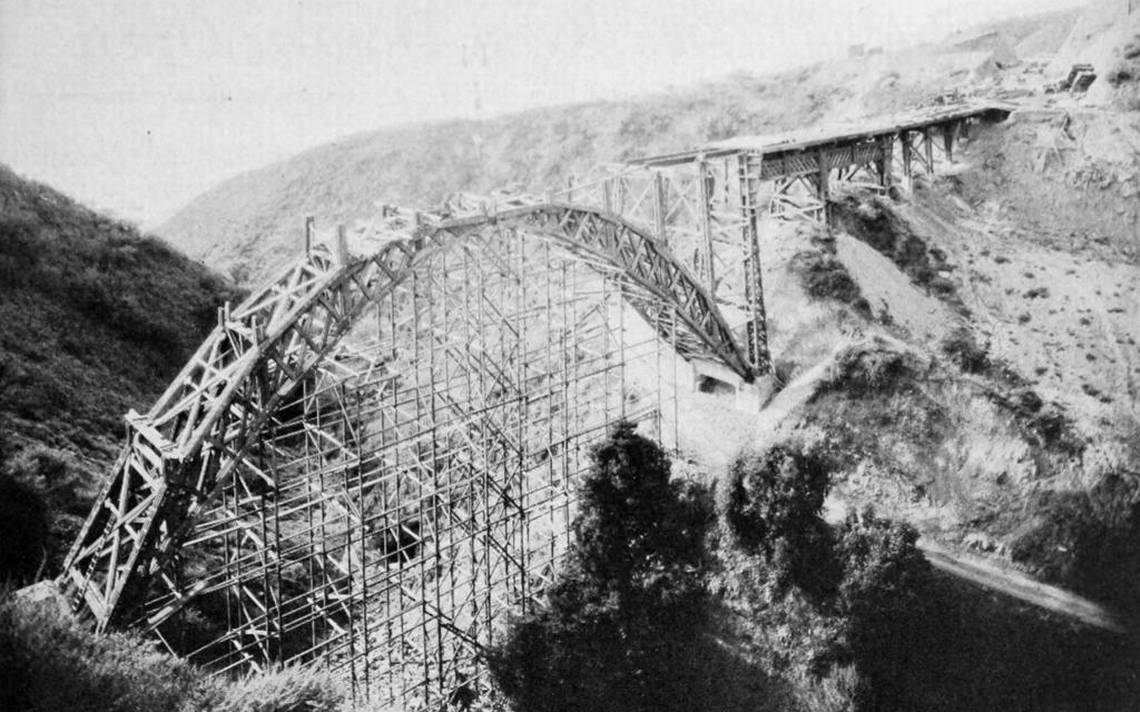
The Dolan Creek Bridge south of Slates Hot Springs was a three-pinned arch design built from redwood timber in 1934–35. It was replaced by a precast concrete girder bridge in 1961.

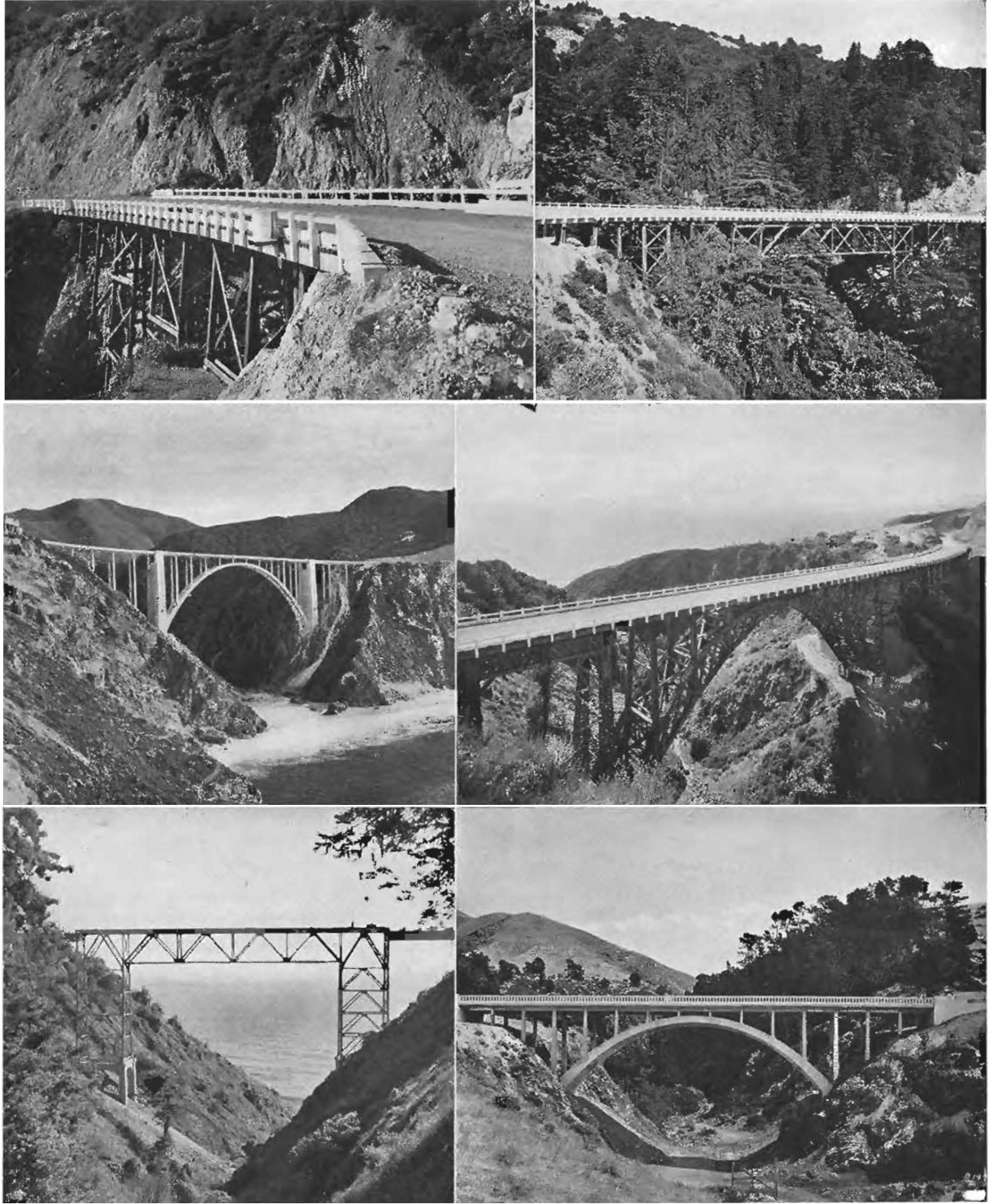
Six of the 29 bridges built along the Carmel–San Simeon Highway during its construction. (Counterclockwise, from upper left) Lime Creek, Torre Creek, Dolan Creek, Burns Creek, Mal Paso Creek, Bixby Bridge.

Road construction necessitated construction of 29 bridges, the most difficult of which was the bridge over Bixby Creek, about 13 miles (21 km) south of Carmel. Upon completion, the Bixby Creek Bridge was 714 feet (218 m) long, 24 feet (7.3 m) wide, 260 feet (79 m) above the creek bed below, and had a main span of 360 feet (110 m). The bridge was designed to support more than six times its intended load. When it was completed on October 15, 1932, Bixby Creek Bridge was the largest arched highway structure in the Western states. Five more reinforced concrete bridges were built at Rocky, Granite, Garapata, Malpaso, and Wildcat Creeks. But the entire highway was not completed for another five years. All of the concrete arch bridges were listed in the National Register of Historic Places in 1986. They were also included in the California Register of Historic Resources in 1992.

The contractor built a large bridge of Redwood with a span of 514 feet (157 m) at Dolan Creek because of the considerable distance required to haul concrete. They also built wood bridges at Lime Creek, Prewitt Creek, Wild Cattle Creek and Torre Canyon. Steel bridges were built at Burns Creek, San Simeon Creek, Pico Creek, Castro Canyon, Mill Creek and Little Pico Creek. The timber and steel bridges, with the exception of Castro Canyon and Mill Creek, were all replaced with concrete bridges later on.

=== Water fountains ===
To provide water to thirsty travelers, the Civilian Conservation Corps built between 1933 and 1937 six hand-crafted stone drinking fountains. The crews built masonry stone walls around local springs at each location. Five are still known to exist, indicated by their distance from the Monterey/San Luis Obispo County line:

- Soda Springs 3.8 miles (6.1 km) 35.794272°N 121.341771°W
- Big Redwood 5.21 miles (8.38 km) 35.836476°N 121.389265°W
- Willow Creek/Seven Stairs 12 miles (19 km) 35.893760°N 121.460486°W
- Lucia 20.4 miles (32.8 km) 36.005744°N 121.509089°W
- Rigdon 27 miles (43 km) 36.055973°N 121.589506°W

One of the fountains is believed to have been lost due to one of the many landslides. Some of them are still operational.

=== Completion ===
In December 1932 during the Great Depression, the state opened a wider, oiled, macadam 37 miles (60 km) section of the two-lane highway from Carmel River in 8 miles (13 km) north to Pfeiffer's Resort on the Big Sur River. Beyond Pfeiffer's Resort, a gravel road extended 13 miles (21 km) south where it ended at a gate. The remainder of the two-lane road south to San Copofaro Creek was opened on June 17, 1937, after 18 years of construction, aided by labor provided by the New Deal. On June 27, 1937, Governor Frank Merriam led a caravan from the Cambria Pines Lodge to San Simeon, where dedication ceremonies began. The wife of the late Senator Elmer Rigdon, who had promoted the bridge and obtained funding, dedicated a silver fir to her husband's memory.

The Elmer Rigdon Memorial Drinking Fountain, 4 miles (6.4 km) north of Lucia, in a turnout between Vicente Creek Bridge and Big Creek Bridge, was dedicated in Elmer Rigdon's memory. The Native Sons of the Golden West dedicated two redwood trees. The caravan then drove north to Pfeiffer Redwoods State Park, where a larger dedication ceremony was held. The initial $1.5 million bond measure was not enough. The final cost when the road was completed 18 years later was $19 million (equivalent to $470.31 million in 2025). About 70,000 pounds (32,000 kg) of dynamite was used to help blast more than 10,000,000 cubic yards (7,600,000 m^{3}) of granite, marble and sandstone. Bixby Bridge alone required 300,000 board feet of Douglas fir, 6,600 cubic yards (5,000 m^{3}) of concrete, and 600,000 pounds (270,000 kg) of reinforcing steel.

The road was initially called the Carmel-San Simeon Highway, but was better known as the Roosevelt Highway, honoring then-current President Franklin D. Roosevelt. The road was frequently closed for extended periods during the winter, making it a seasonal route. The new route was incorporated into the state highway system and re-designated as Highway 1 in 1939. In 1940, the state contracted for "the largest installation of guard rail ever placed on a California state highway", calling for 12 miles (19 km) of steel guard rail and 3,649 guide posts along 46.6 miles (75.0 km) of the road. In 1941, 160 inches (410 cm) of rain fell on Big Sur, and the state considered abandoning the route. Slides were so common that gates were used to close the road to visitors at the northern and southern ends during the winter. During World War II, nighttime blackouts along the coast were ordered as a precaution against Japanese attack.

== Impact on residents ==
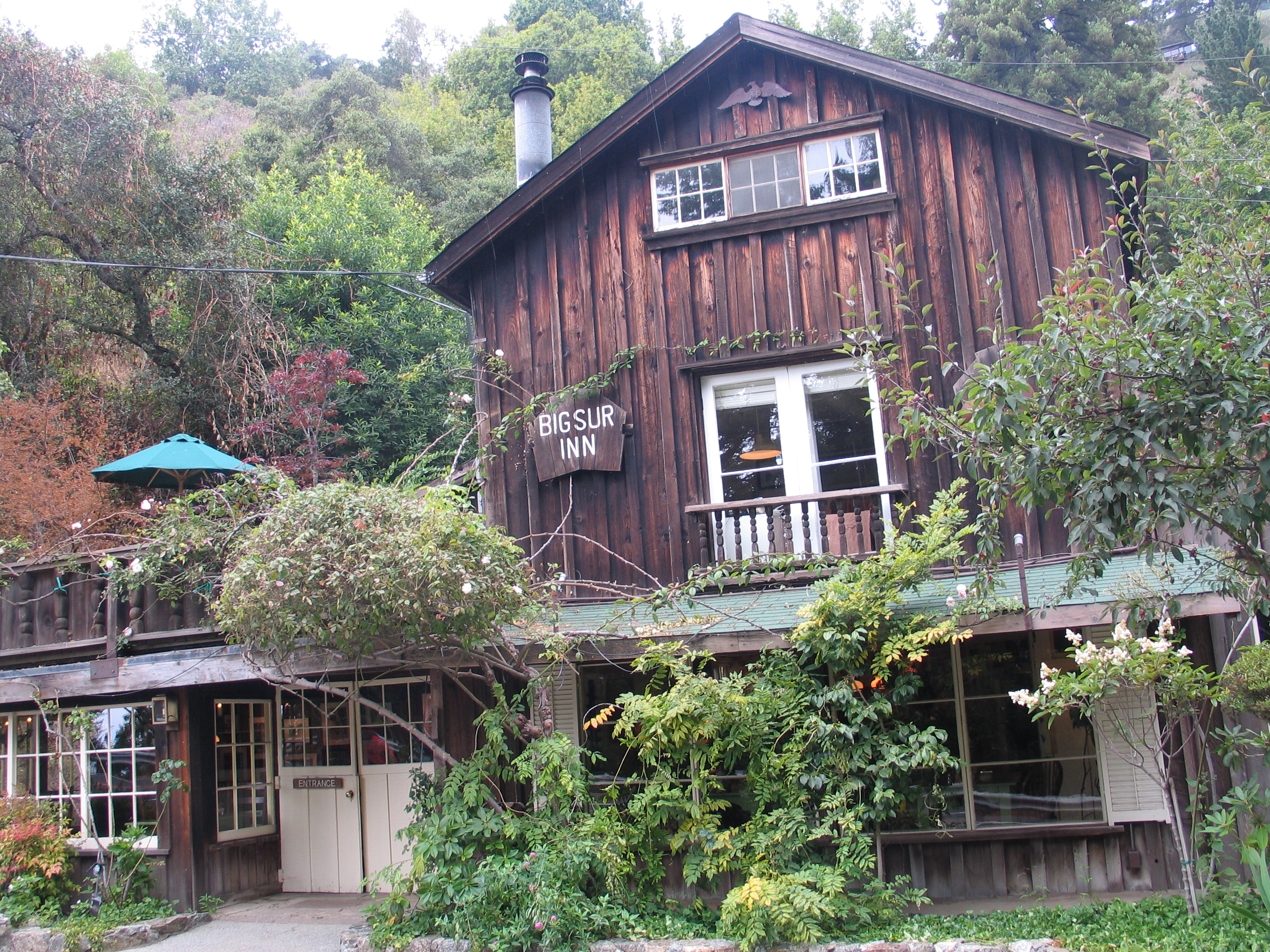
Deetjen's Big Sur Inn

The opening of Highway 1 in 1937 dramatically altered the local economy. Before the highway was completed, a developer who wanted to build a subdivision offered to buy the Pfeiffer Ranch from John and Florence Pfeiffer for $210,000 ($4.05 million in 2025). John was the son of Big Sur pioneers Michael Pfeiffer and Barbara Laquet. Pfeiffer wanted the land preserved and he sold 680 acres (2.8 km^{2}) to the state of California in 1933. This became the foundation of Pfeiffer Big Sur State Park. The Civilian Conservation Corps built campgrounds, buildings, fences, a footbridge, and trails in Pfeiffer Big Sur State Park. They used redwood lumber and river rocks as building materials to create a wood and stone "park rustic" style. They also fought fires and removed poison oak. A relative of the Pfeiffer family built the Big Sur River Inn in 1934.

Land values rose. Some residents regretted the access provided by the highway. Jaime de Angulo, who first arrived in Big Sur in 1915, wrote:

But my coast is gone, you see. It will be an altogether different affair. I don't know what to think of it, on the whole. My first reaction of course was one of intense sorrow and horror. My Coast had been defiled and raped. The spirits would depart. And as I travelled with Mr. Farmer (the stage man) past Castro's place, past Grimes' cañon, and contemplated the fearful gashes cut into the mountain, and the dirt sliding down, right down into the water in avalanches, my heart bled.

Many members of the original families were extremely upset by the destruction caused by the construction. The contractors employed primitive construction methods. Laborers used tons of dynamite to blast large amounts of earth. When the workers cut into hillsides, they left naked scars void of brush. Machinery blasted through the great cliffs, scarring granite promontories, defiling canyons and filling waterfalls with debris. They pushed "millions and millions and billions of yards of earth" and rock debris over the edge of the road, down the slopes, and into the oceans.

Deetjen's Big Sur Inn was opened in 1936. The region's economy and population growth was strongly influenced by the construction of permanent and summer homes. Many visitor facilities were constructed. The agricultural and minor industrial economy was quickly supplanted by a tourism-oriented economy. Highway 1 has been at capacity for many years. The state legislature permanently limited the road along the Big Sur coast to two lanes, halting any proposals to upgrade the route to a freeway. In 1977, the U.S. Forest Service noted in its environmental impact statement, "Highway 1 has reached its design capacity during peak-use periods." It is currently at or near capacity much of the year. The primary transportation objective of the Big Sur Coastal Land Use plan is to maintain Highway 1 as a scenic two-lane road and to reserve most remaining capacity for the priority uses of the act.

== Repeated closings ==
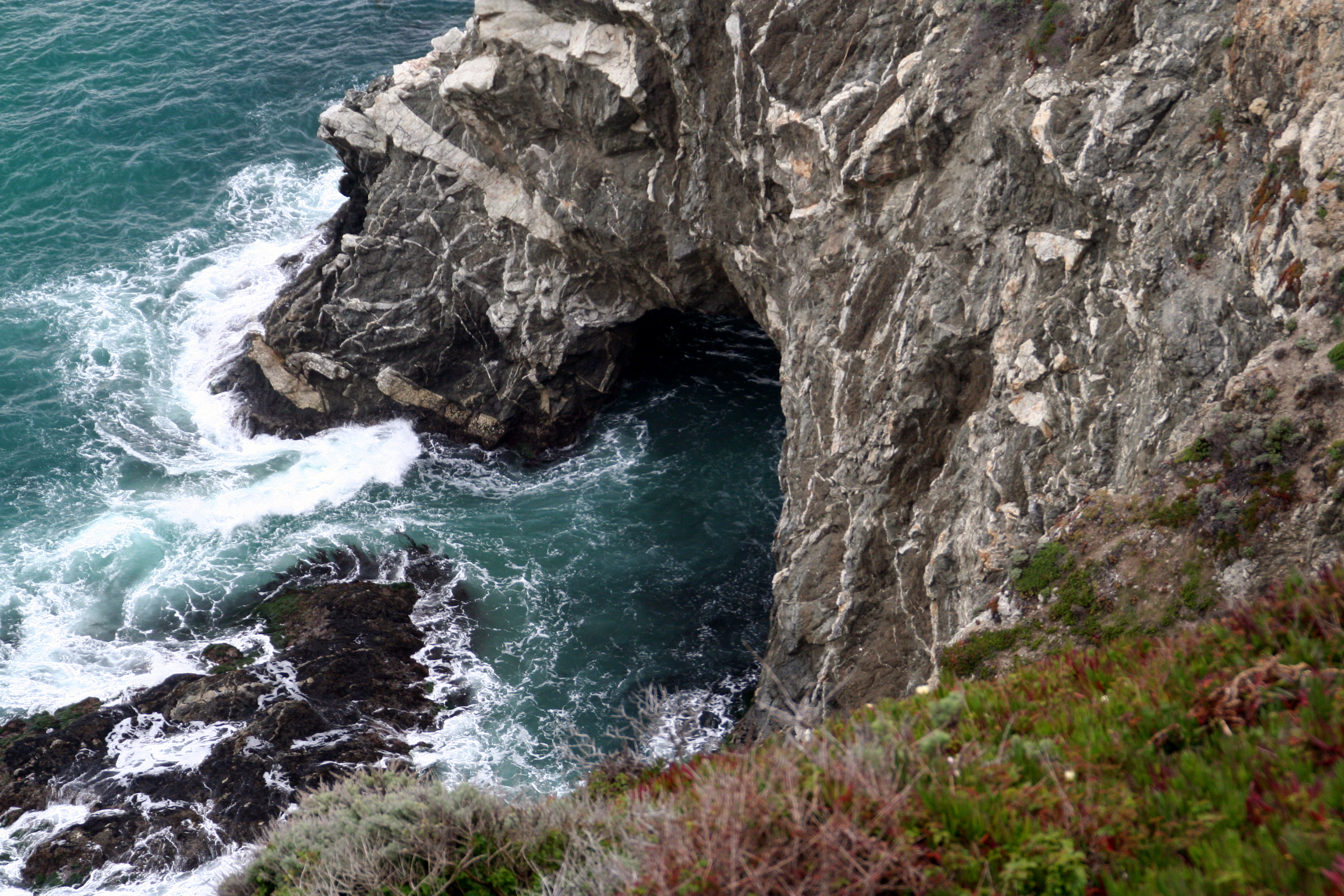
Shoreline looking down from Bixby Bridge, 2007

The steep topography, active faults, diverse geology, and seasonal storms combine to make the rugged Big Sur area one of the most landslide-prone stretches of the California coast. As a result, the California Department of Transportation has had to make many repairs to the road. Highway 1 has been closed on more than 55 occasions due to damage from landslides, mudslides, erosion, and fire. Aside from Highway 1, the only access to Big Sur is via the winding, narrow, 24.5 miles (39.4 km) long Nacimiento-Fergusson Road, which from Highway 1 south of Lucia passes east through Fort Hunter Liggett to Mission Road in Jolon. It's about a 50 miles (80 km) and hour-and-a-half drive to U.S. Route 101 (US 101).

The remaining segment of the unpaved Old Coast Road intersects with the Coast Highway at Bixby Creek Bridge and climbs steeply inland up Cerro Hill, traversing the El Sur Ranch. It crosses the Little Sur River near the junction of the North and South forks, formerly the location of the Idlewild Hotel from about 1900 to 1921. The road then descends and rejoins Highway 1 across from the main entrance of Andrea Molera State Park. It can be impassable in wet weather and is suitable for high-clearance vehicles. The Coast Ridge Road south of Posts is closed to vehicles. From Posts, it climbs to the coastal summit, and follows the westernmost ridge of the Santa Lucia Range from Big Sur to Cone Peak. From Cone Peak the road extended south, crossing Nacimiento Summit and continuing south past Chalk Peak to where the road is now named Plaskett Ridge Road. From there it began a westerly descent to a point along the South Coast near Sand Dollar Beach and Plaskett. Segments of the Old Coast Ridge Road have been given new names, and some sections of the road are closed. Portions of it are now a Forest Service trail.

=== 20th century ===
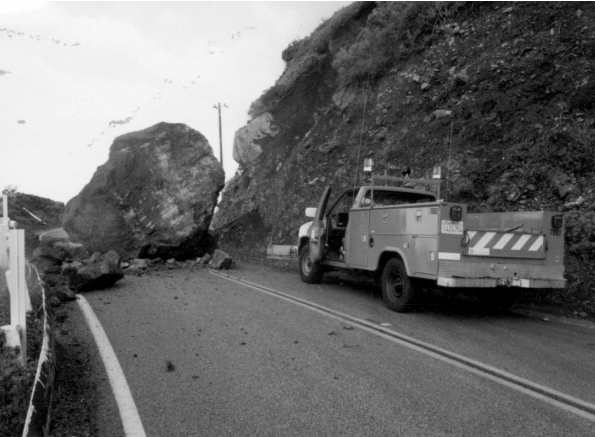
Rockslide on Highway 1 near the San Luis Obispo County line on February 18, 1994

On January 15, 1952, the highway was closed 7 miles (11 km) north of San Simeon to Big Sur due to "numerous heavy slides". December 1955 was the fifth wettest since 1872. At the Big Sur Maintenance Station, 8.45 inches of rain was recorded in one 24-hour period on December 23. Torrential rains caused flood conditions throughout Monterey County and Highway 1 in Big Sur was closed in numerous locations due to slides.

A series of storms in the winter of 1983 caused four major road-closing slides between January and April, including a large 963 feet (294 m) high landslide slide near Julia Pfeiffer Burns State Park and McWay Falls that buried Highway 1 with 4,000,000 cubic yards (3,100,000 m^{3}) of rocks and dirt. Twenty-six bulldozers worked for 22 weeks to clear the highway. The repair crews pushed the slide into the ocean which ended up creating a beach inside McWay Cove that did not exist before. It was up to that date the largest earth-moving project ever undertaken by Caltrans. Caltrans routinely pushed slide debris into the ocean shore until the Monterey Bay National Marine Sanctuary was created in 1992, which made dumping material into the ocean illegal. Highway 1 was closed for 14 months. One individual was killed while repairing the road. In 1983, Skinner Pierce died while clearing the slide near Julia Pfeiffer Burns State Park when the bulldozer he was operating fell down the slide into the ocean. His body was never recovered.

In 1998, about 40 different locations on the road were damaged by El Niño storms, including a major slide 2 miles (3.2 km) south of Gorda that closed the road for almost three months. The Associated Press described the damage as "the most extensive destruction in the 60-year history of the world famous scenic route".

=== 2011 closures ===
In March 2011, a 40 feet (12 m) section of Highway 1 just south of the Rocky Creek Bridge collapsed, closing the road for several months until a single lane bypass could be built. The state replaced that section of road with a viaduct that wraps around the unstable hillside. On January 16, 2016, the road was closed for portions of a day due to a mudslide near Julia Pfeiffer Burns State Park.

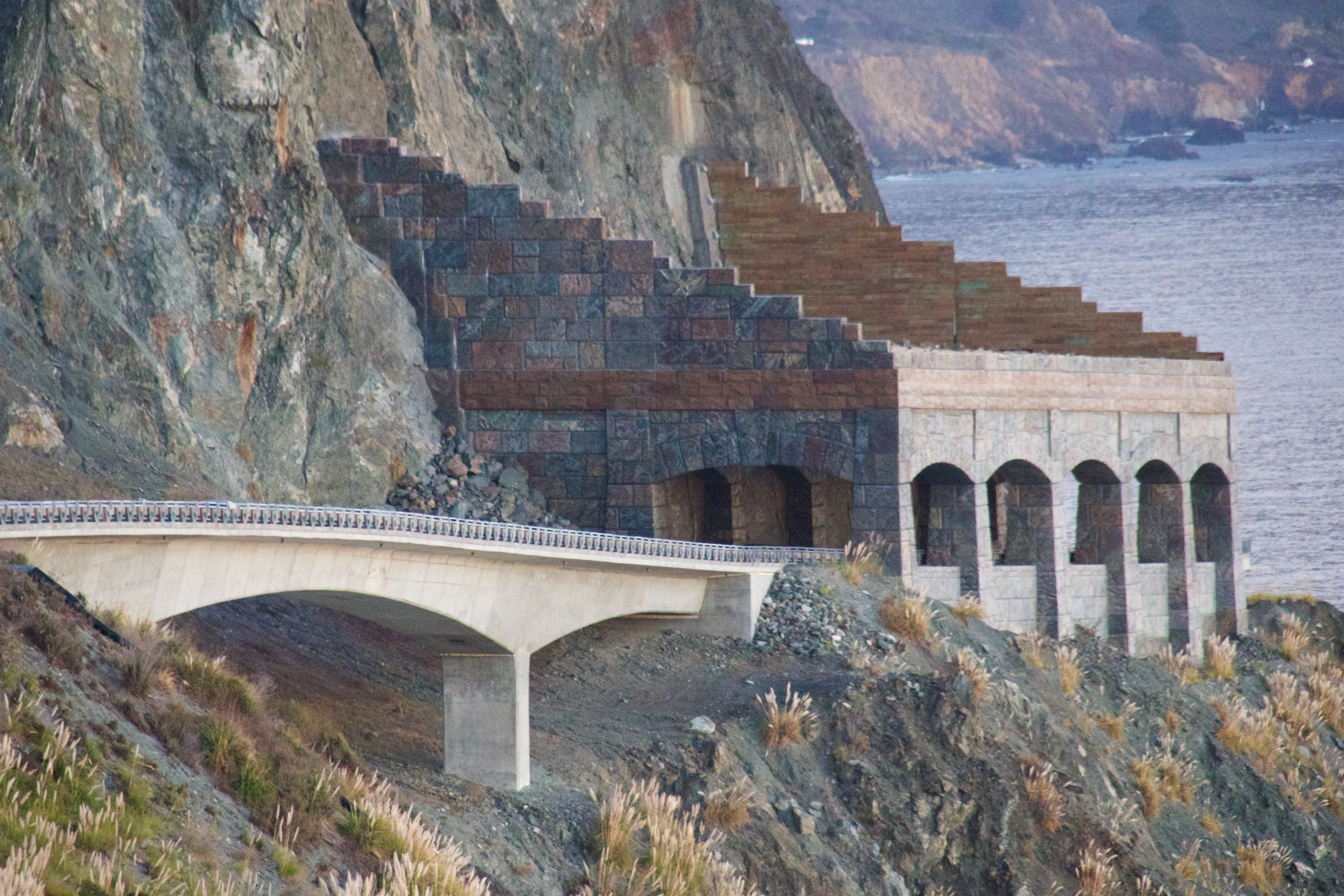
The Pitkins Curve Bridge and Rain Rocks Rock Shed protect Highway 1 from rock slides.

=== Pitkins Curve ===
Pitkins Curve is a .3 miles (0.48 km) segment of highway .5 miles (0.80 km) north of Limekiln State Park. It is located on a highly unstable slope that has repeatedly been the site of rock falls and slides that have closed the road. It was the most expensive stretch of highway to maintain in all of California. Removing fallen rock, repairing the road, and temporary solutions to prevent damage cost Caltrans over $1 million annually. Other places in Big Sur only cost $10–20K per year. In January 2014, Caltrans completed construction of the 625 feet (191 m) Pitkins Curve Bridge and 240 feet (73 m) Rain Rock Shelter. Both rely on steel-cased, cast-in-drilled-hole (CIDH) piles with deep rock sockets. The Rock Shed concrete was formed to look like stacked stone. The total cost of the project was $39 million.

=== Soberanes Fire closures ===
During the summer of 2016, the road was closed on several occasions due to the Soberanes Fire. During the following winter, Pfeiffer Big Sur State Park received more than 60 inches (150 cm) of rain, while other locations received up to 83 inches (210 cm), the most rain recorded since 1915. In early February 2017, several mudslides blocked the road in more than half a dozen locations. The failure of the Pfeiffer Canyon Bridge and two major slides closed the highway for more than 14 months. The closure of Highway 1 in two locations isolated the 60 families and 350 residents between the two locations for weeks, forced Esalen Institute to evacuate guests by helicopter, and residents to ferry supplies in the same way.

=== Pfeiffer Canyon Bridge failure ===
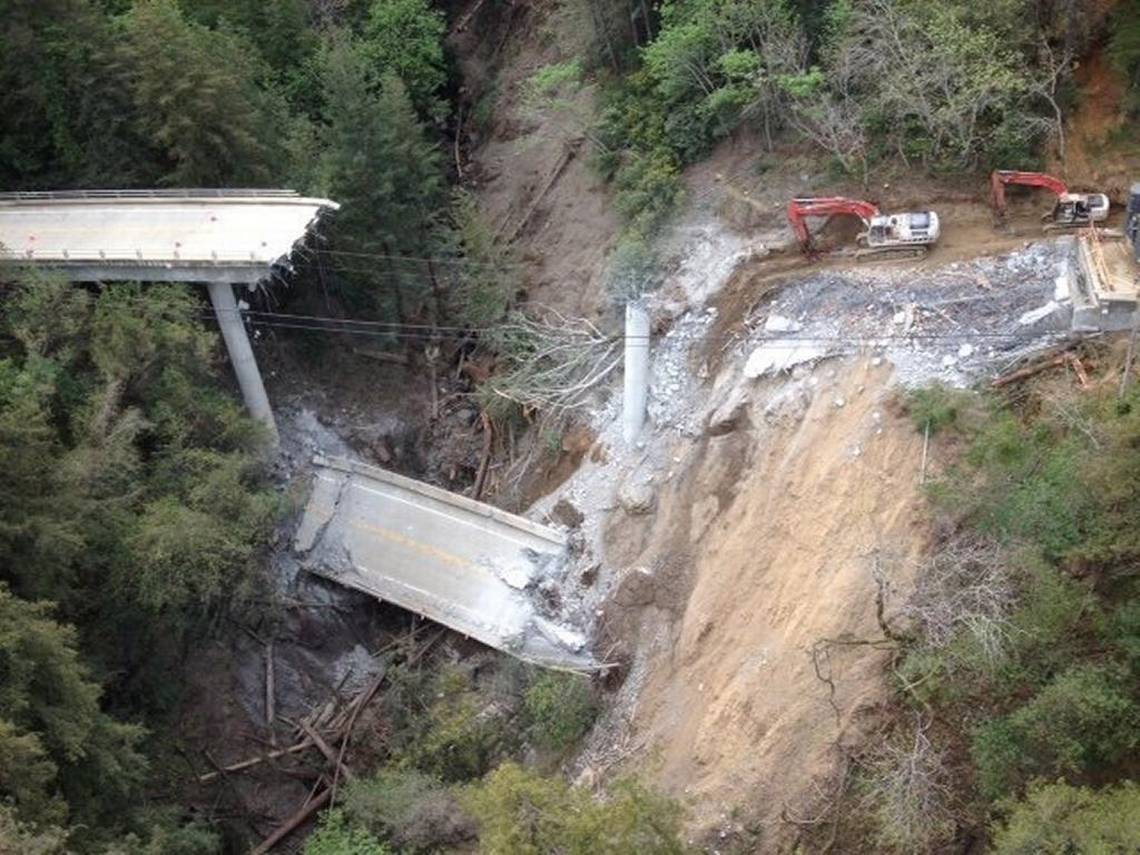
Crews demolish the Pfeiffer Canyon Bridge on Highway 1 in Big Sur after erosion weakened one of its piers.

Just south of Pfeiffer Big Sur State Park, shifting earth damaged a pier supporting a bridge over the 320 feet (98 m) deep Pfeiffer Canyon. Caltrans immediately closed the highway on February 12, 2017, and announced the next day that the Pfeiffer Canyon Bridge was damaged beyond repair and would have to be replaced. Highway 1 remained closed.

Caltrans immediately began planning to replace the bridge and contracted with XKT Engineering on Mare Island to construct a replacement single-span steel girder bridge. The new roadway was designed without support piers. The rebuilt bridge opened on October 13, 2017, at a cost of $24 million after 8 months of road closure.

=== Paul's Slide ===
In the south, there is a perennial problem point known as Paul's Slide just north of intersection with the Nacimiento-Ferguson Road. According to a spokesperson for CalTrans, “This is an area prone to slide activity both in the winter when the ground is lubricated and often, in months after the rains, when the soil is drying out.” On January 8, 2023, the highway was closed just south of the entrance to Limekiln State Park, which is also closed due to storm damage. At the north end, the highway was closed at Lucia, about 23 miles (37 km) north of the county line and 55 miles (89 km) from Monterey. The area has seen a 30 to 35% drop off in guest traffic as a result. In August 2023, the state paused work after earth movement was detected. In October 2023, after seven months of off and on-again work and $24.4 million in costs, the highway remained closed. The highway through Paul's Slide would eventually reopen in June 2024, a closure to the north at Regent's Slide continued to prevent through access towards the north. The same area was closed in January 2017 by a massive slide totaling about 2,000,000 cubic yards (1,500,000 m^{3}). Business and resident were cut off and were ferried in and out and received supplies by helicopter for about two weeks. The highway was reopened on July 19, 2017.

=== Mud Creek slide ===
The May 22, 2017, mud slide at Mud Creek covered Highway 1 for more than a quarter-mile.

On May 20, 2017, the largest slide in the highway's history at Mud Creek blocked the road 1 mile (1.6 km) southeast of Gorda or about 60 miles (97 km) south of Monterey. The slide began 1,100 feet (340 m) up the side of the mountain and dumped an estimated 5,000,000 cubic yards (3,800,000 m^{3}), or about 1.5 million tons of dirt, on to the road and more than 550 feet (170 m) into the ocean. The slide was national and worldwide news. Larger than the slide that blocked the highway in 1983 at Julia Pfeiffer Burns State park, it covered one-quarter-mile (.40 km) of the highway and buried it up to 160 feet (49 m) deep in some places. On August 2, 2017, Caltrans decided to rebuild the highway over the slide instead of clearing it. To stabilize the toe of the slide and prevent the surf from further eroding the slide, Caltrans contractors brought in about 200,000 short tons (180,000 t) of rock to build the revetment. Crews worked seven days a week, at least 12 hours per day, from July 2017 until mid-July 2018 to get the road repaired. It was reopened on July 18, 2018, at a cost of $54 million.

=== Rat Creek slide ===
Caltrans announced in December 2019 that they would preemptively close the highway in advance of forecasts of significant rain.

Following several summers of intense drought and wildfire, which weakened soils, a rainy 2020-2021 winter season produced mudslides in the Big Sur region. On Friday, January 29, 2021, a large section of the road collapsed into the sea near Rat Creek, 15 miles (24 km) south of the community of Big Sur Village. The breach began the day before, with California Highway Patrol officer noting loss of the southbound (ocean side) lanes. Caltrans noted the debris flow the same day, and ordered an emergency repair. When repair crews arrived Friday, they reported that the both lanes of the road had been lost. Media drone footage showed a complete loss of the road at the breech, including land on the inland side of the road.

During the spring, contactors worked seven days a week to fill the slide with compacted dirt and bring it up to road level. A new roadbed was built at a cost of $11.5 million. The road was reopened in April 2021, two months earlier than expected.

=== Later closures ===
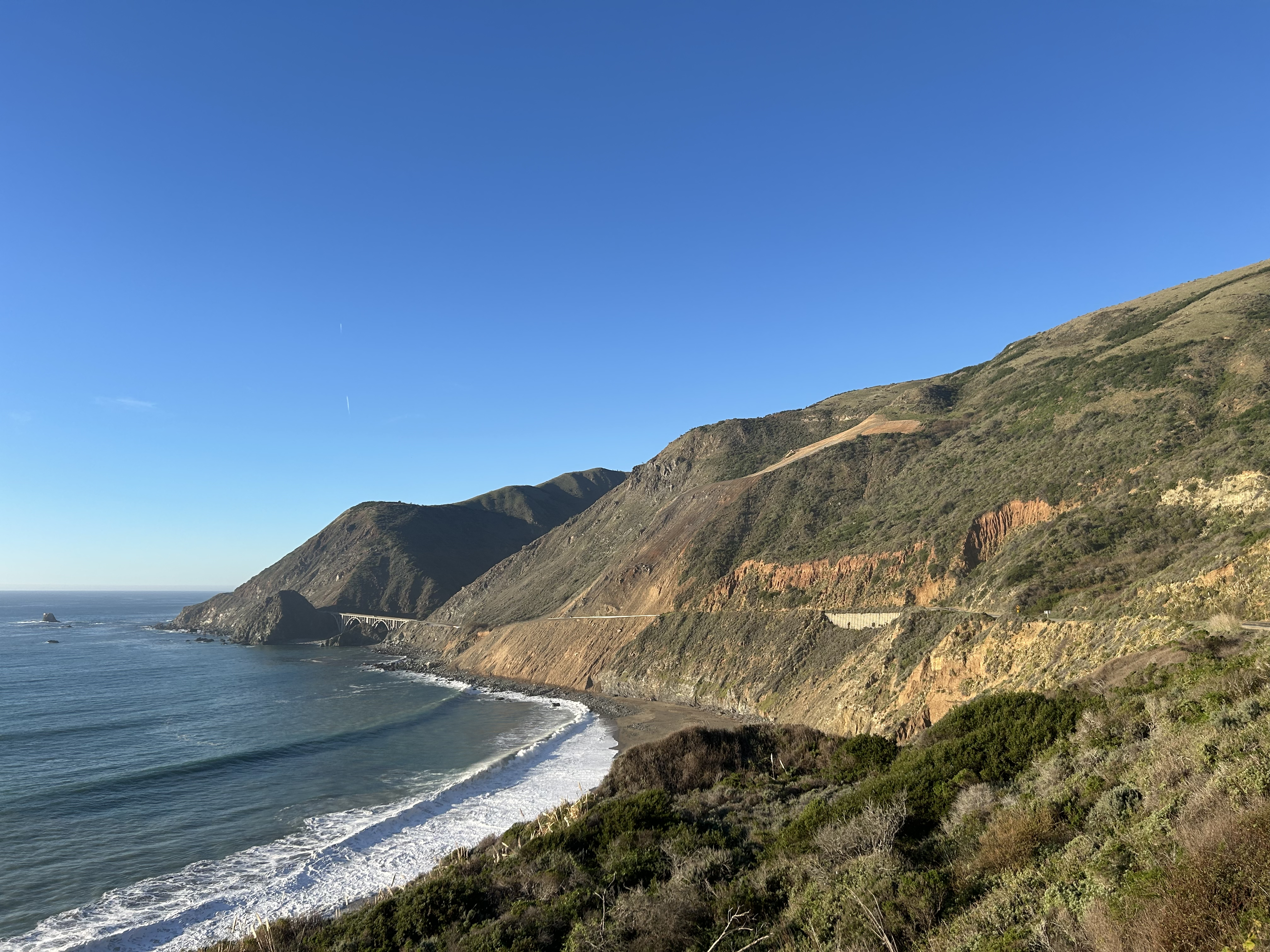
Regent's Slide as seen from the south in January 2026, after the Coast Highway fully reopened.

During the wet winter of 2022-23, the highway was closed multiple times beginning on December 31, 2022, due to slides and washouts. Caltrans determined that the roadway was not safe at multiple locations due to damage and the unpredictability of the new failures. A significant slide 1 mile (1.6 km) south of Ragged Point covered both lanes of travel. The highway became impassible and CalTrans closed the road in the south near the Elephant seal viewing area at Piedras Blancas beach in San Simeon, California. They initially closed the road 65 miles (105 km) to the north at Palo Colorado Rd. in Monterey County, although they later moved the northern closure south as conditions permitted. They expect the highway to remain closed for several weeks to months. On January 8, 2023, the road was closed at Paul's Slide near the county border, with two additional slides closing further sections of the road in February 2024. As of October 2024, the road remained closed with reopening not expected until 2025 at the earliest. The final 7-mile (11 km) section of highway near Regent's Slide would not reopen until January 2026.

== Popularity ==
The drive along Highway 1 has been described as "one of the best drives on Earth", and is considered one of the top 10 motorcycle rides in the United States. Highway 1 was named the most popular drive in California in 2014 by the American Automobile Association. Condé Nast Traveler named State Route 1 through Big Sur one of the top 10 world-famous streets, comparable to Broadway in New York City and the Champs-Élysées in Paris. Most of the nearly 7 million tourists who currently visit Big Sur each year never leave Highway 1, because the adjacent Santa Lucia Range is one of the largest roadless coastal areas in the entire United States; Highway 1 and the Nacimiento-Fergusson Road offer the only paved access into and out of the region. In January 2021, the Nacimiento-Fergusson Road was washed out due to the impacts of the Dolan Fire and closed, cutting off the only alternative route out of the area. It is not expected to reopen until December 2023.

The beauty of the scenery along the narrow, two-lane road attracts enormous crowds during summer vacation periods and holiday weekends, and traffic is frequently slow. Visitors have reported to the California Highway Patrol hours-long stop-and-go traffic from Rocky Creek Bridge to Rio Road in Carmel during the Memorial Day weekend. The highway winds along the western flank of the mountains mostly within sight of the Pacific Ocean, varying from near sea level up to a 1,000-foot (300 m) sheer drop to the water. Most of the highway is extremely narrow, with tight curves, steep shoulders and blind turns. The route offers few or no passing lanes and, along some stretches, very few pullouts. The sides are occasionally so steep that the shoulders are virtually non-existent.

=== Traffic, camping, and parking problems ===
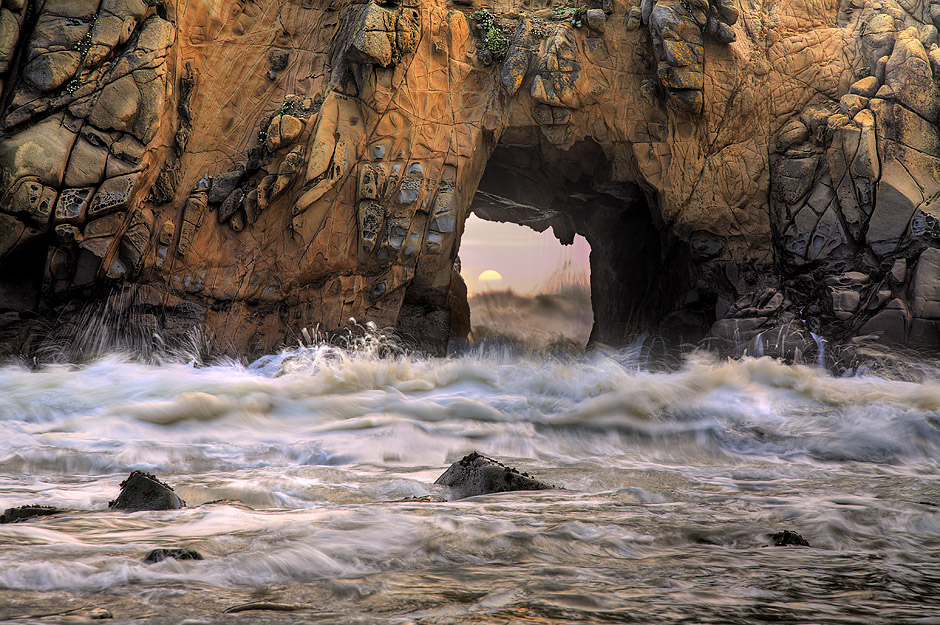
An off-shore rock formation near Pfeiffer Beach

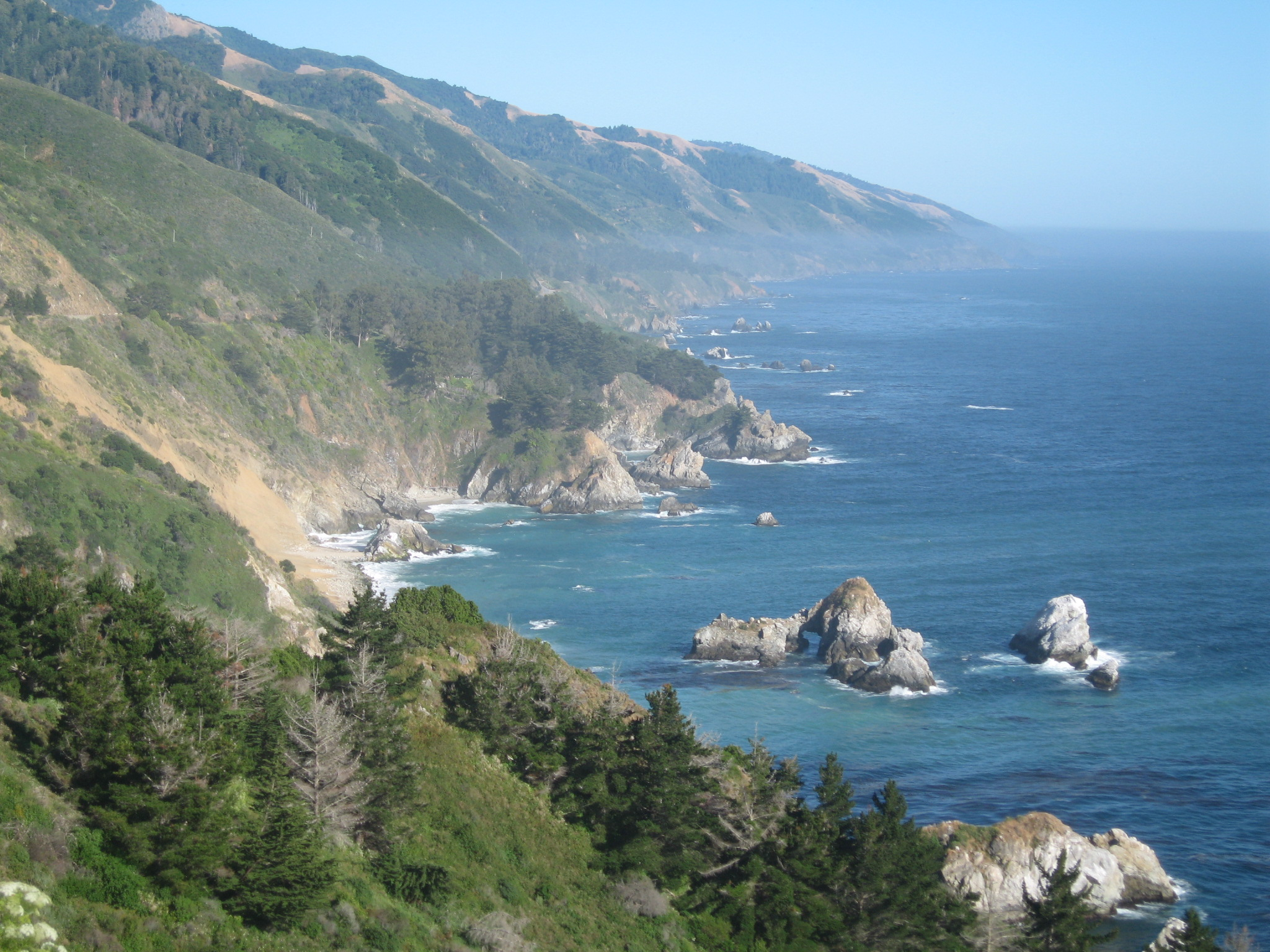
Big Sur coastline looking south, with the McWay Rocks (with arch) in the foreground, and McWay Cove in the center.

Since the introduction of smart phones and social media, the popularity of certain Big Sur attractions like Bixby Creek Bridge, Pfeiffer Beach, McWay Falls, and the Pine Ridge Trail have dramatically increased. During holiday weekends and most summer vacation periods, traffic congestion and parking in these areas can be extremely difficult. Some locations have limited parking, and visitors park on the shoulder of Highway 1, sometimes leaving inadequate space for passing vehicles. At Bixby Creek Bridge, visitors sometimes park on the nearby Old Coast Road, blocking the road and residents' access to their homes. Highway 1 is often congested with traffic backed up behind slow drivers. There are a large number of unpaved pull outs along the highway, but there are only three paved road-side vista points allowing motorists to stop and admire the landscape. Due to the large number of visitors, congestion and slow traffic between Carmel and Posts is becoming the norm. There have been reports of tourists leaving their vehicle in the middle of Highway 1 to stop and take pictures.

In 2016, the average daily vehicle counts at the Big Sur River Bridge (milepost 46.595) were 6,500, a 13% increase from 5,700 in 2011. An average daily vehicle count of 6,500 translates to 2.3 million vehicles per year. Counts up to 14,200 were obtained from measurements at the northern and southern boundaries of the region. The lowest number was found at the border of the Monterey and San Luis Obispo County lines.

When the highway opened in 1937, average daily vehicle traffic was over 2,500, but dropped to 1,462 the next year. It rose somewhat until December 1, 1942, when mandatory gas rationing was instituted during World War II. The rationing program and a ban on pleasure driving extremely limited the number of visitors who made the trip to Big Sur. On August 15, 1945, World War II gas rationing was ended on the West Coast of the United States. The number of vehicles rose dramatically in 1946 and increased steadily. Tourism and travel boomed along the coast. When Hearst Castle opened in 1958, a huge number of tourists also flowed through Big Sur.

Visitors continued to increase during the 1960s, due in part to the opening of several major attractions in the area, especially the Esalen Institute. The filming of The Sandpiper in 1964 and its release in 1965 dramatically increased public awareness of the region. In 1970, the average daily vehicle count was 3,700, and as of 2008, reached about 4,500.

Residents are especially concerned about traffic along single-lane Sycamore Canyon Road to Pfeiffer Beach. The beach has been owned by the U.S. Forest Service since 1906, and they own an easement along the road. About 80 homes are situated along Sycamore Canyon Road. About 600 vehicles a day use the road, but there are only 65 parking spaces at the beach itself, so some tourists park on the highway and walk the 2 miles (3.2 km) road to the beach, which is illegal because the road is so narrow. On Sunday of Memorial Day weekend in 2018, the parking lot was full all day. Parks Management Company, which manages the day-use parking lot at Pfeiffer Beach, turned away more than 1,000 cars from the entrance to Sycamore Canyon Road. Visitors were redirected to the parking lot the Big Sur Station, a nearby multi-agency facility, where for $15 they could park and take a newly introduced shuttle service to the beach. The Coast Property Owners Association had been pressuring the Forest Service for a shuttle service for more than a year.

Due to the popularity of the region, camping facilities are often crowded or full. Visitors are prone to camp in roadside pullouts, which is illegal. Violaters are subject to a $1,000 fine.

=== Bixby Creek Bridge issues ===
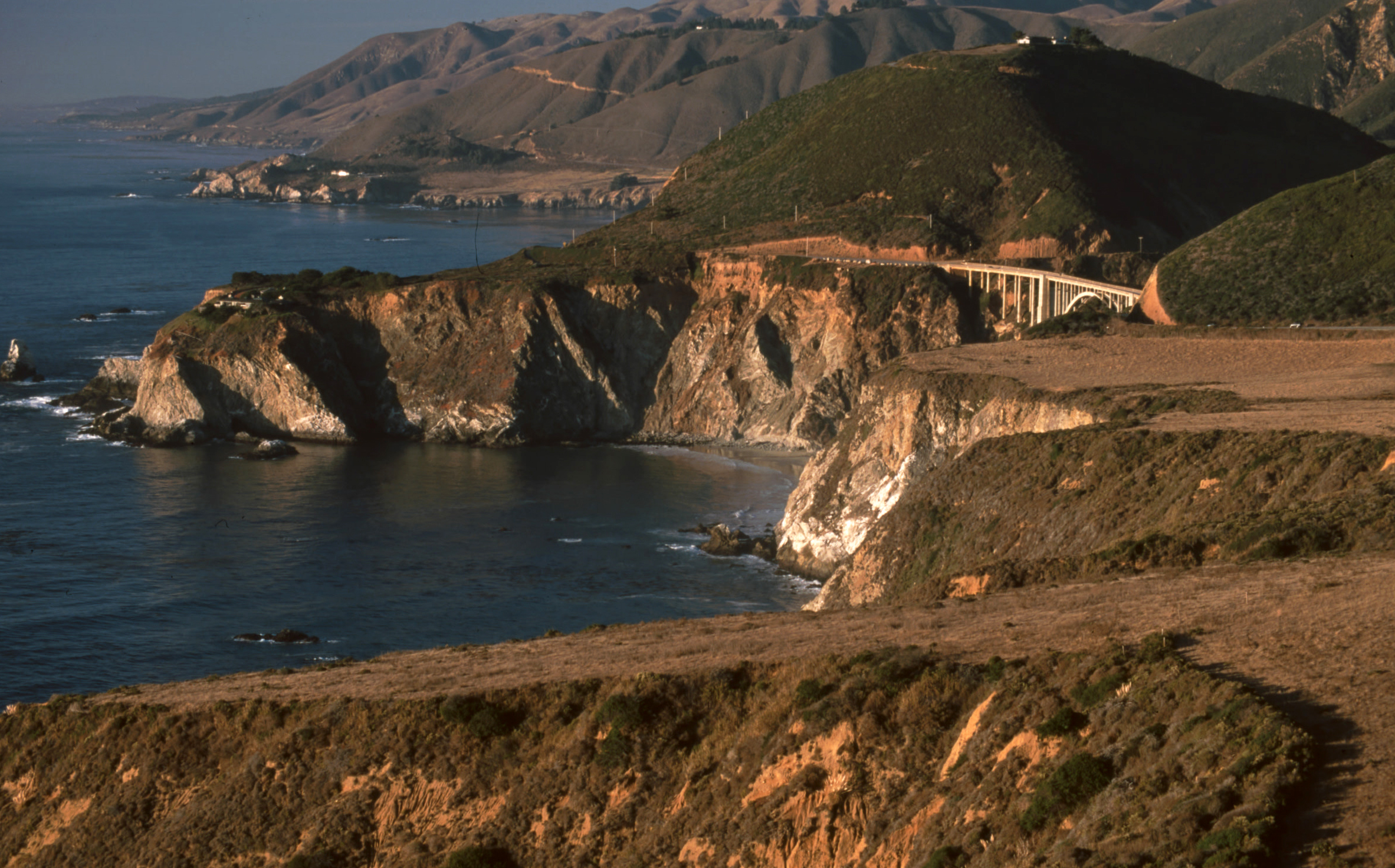
Bixby Creek Bridge and Big Sur Highway from Hurricane Point, 2010. Note cars parked on shoulder, south side of bridge. Traffic is often obstructed here by illegal parking on the highway.

Due to the large number of visitors, congestion and slow traffic between Carmel and the Bixby Creek Bridge is frequently the norm during popular holiday and vacation periods. Residents complain that the bridge area is "like a Safeway parking lot". Traffic can come to a standstill as motorists wait for a parking spot. There is a pull out to the north and west side of Highway 1, but when it is full, visitors sometimes fail to completely pull off the highway, leaving inadequate space for passing vehicles.

In 2024, local authorities including Caltrans, the California Highway Patrol, and the Monterey County Sheriff's Office, began enforcing regulations that ban parking on Coast Road near the Bridge, citing issues with access for residents and emergency services in addition to pedestrian safety concerns.

There are no toilets within several miles of the bridge, and visitors resort to defecating in nearby bushes. Residents complain about toilet paper, human waste, and trash littering the roadside.

== Scenic designations ==
The section of Highway 1 running through Big Sur is widely considered one of the most scenic driving routes in the United States, if not the world. The views are one reason that Big Sur was ranked second among all United States destinations in TripAdvisor's 2008 Travelers' Choice Destination Awards. The unblemished natural scenery owes much of its preservation to the highly restrictive development plans enforced in Big Sur; no billboards or advertisements are permitted along the highway and signage for businesses must be modestly scaled and of a rural nature conforming to the Big Sur region. The state of California designated the 72-mile (116 km) section of the highway from Cambria to Carmel Highlands as the first California Scenic Highway in 1965. In 1966, First Lady Lady Bird Johnson led the official scenic road designation ceremony at Bixby Creek Bridge. In 1996, the road became one of the first designated by the federal government as an "All-American Road" under the National Scenic Byways Program. The designation defined the highway itself as the destination. CNN Traveler named McWay Falls as the most beautiful place in California.
