= Landels-Hill Big Creek Reserve =

Nature reserve in California, USA

- Location within California Location within the United States
- Location: Big Sur, Monterey County, California
- Coordinates: 36°4′0″N 121°35′0″W
- Area: 3,848 acres (6.013 mi^{2})
- Governing body: University of California, Santa Cruz
- Website: ucnature.org/reserves/landels-hill-big-creek-reserve/

The 3,848 acres (6.013 mi^{2}) Landels-Hill Big Creek Reserve located in the southern region of Big Sur, California is owned by the University of California Natural Reserve System. It is located off State Route 1 in 50 miles (80 km) south of Monterey and adjacent to the Big Creek State Marine Reserve and Big Creek State Marine Conservation Area. It is open only for approved research or educational purposes.

== Mission statement ==
“The guiding principle of the Landels-Hill Big Creek Reserve is to contribute to the understanding of ecological processes as they occur in intact, protected natural systems through on-site research and education, and to provide a benchmark for interpreting long-term environmental change.”

== History ==
The Big Creek Ranch was originally owned by a small cooperative of families. The original owners donated a section of the land in order to ensure conservation of this unique ecological habitat. The land was transferred to the University of California where it would become part of the University of California Natural Reserve System. In 1978 the reserve's name was formally changed to Landels-Hill Big Creek Reserve and a faculty member from the University of California Santa Cruz (UCSC) was given the position of managing the day-to-day affairs. A committee of UCSC faculty, a representative each from The Nature Conservancy, Save the Redwoods League, and the former owners was formed to advise on decisions related to the use of the land. It was designated part of the California Coast Ranges International Biosphere Reserve in 1983.

== Environment ==
=== Topography ===
Running through the Landels-Hill Big Creek Reserve are the Santa Lucia Mountains. This mountain range is predominantly made up of granite and metamorphic rock which provide for steeply sloping cliff faces, and rough ridges throughout the area.

=== Geology ===
The geology of the Landels-Hill Big Creek Reserve is unique. There are depositions of sea floor deposits from the Cretaceous age, as well as Franciscan Complex, a medley of rock scraped off the oceanic crust as the Pacific Plate subducts beneath the North American Plate. In the midst of this, there is also a Granitoid Salinia. This Salinia is thought to have originated in the Southern Sierra Nevada range some 100 million years ago, and then was displaced to its present position by a series of thrust and strike-slip faults. The geology of this region has proved vastly important in determining the geologic history of California, and the nature of the contact between the Pacific and North American tectonic plates.

=== Landscapes and habitats ===
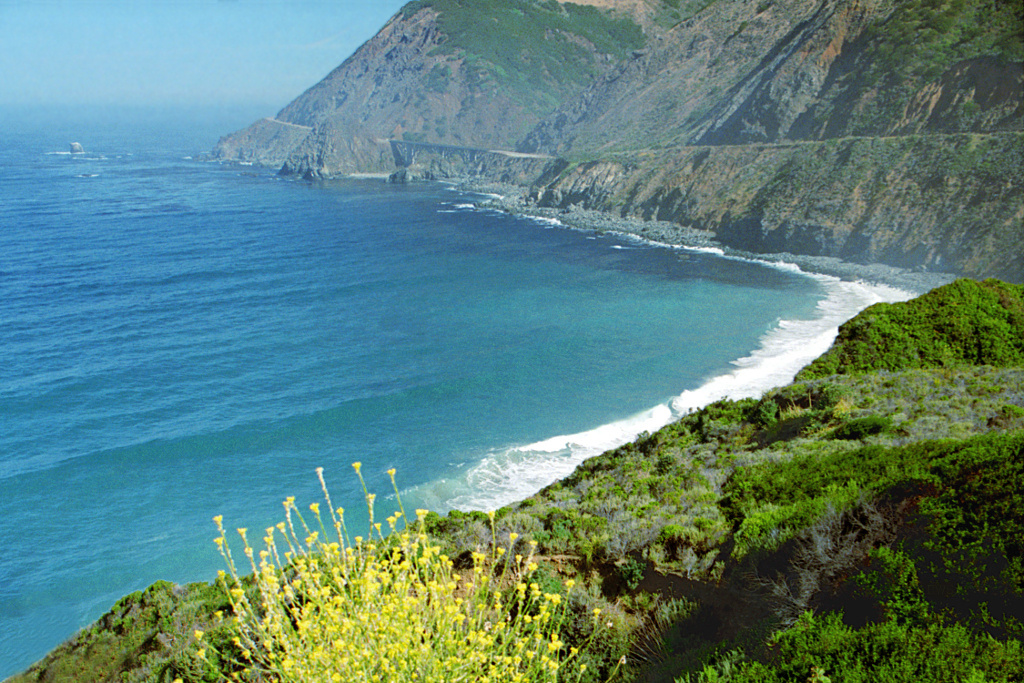
Coastal flora in Big Sur along California State Route 1 near Big Creek Bridge with the reserve located in the higher elevations, above the roadway.

Habitats at the reserve include coastal strand; coastal bluff scrub; coastal scrub; ceanothus shrub; sage scrub; rocky scrubland; chamise chaparral; coast range and streambank woodland; stream-mouth woodland; sycamore-draw woodland; coast live oak forest; mixed hardwood-coast live oak forest; mixed hardwood-canyon live oak forest; Ponderosa pine-Hoover's manzanita woodland; Ponderosa pine-mixed hardwood-coast live oak forest; Ponderosa pine-mixed hardwood-canyon live oak forest; Ponderosa pine-coast live oak forest; coulter pine forest; Santa Lucia-fir woodland; redwood streamside forest; redwood-mixed hardwood forest; pure redwood forest; and aquatic (both freshwater and marine) habitats.

This diverse landscape provides a thriving habitat for a wide variety of wildlife. Wildlife includes vascular plants, insects, amphibians, reptiles, and terrestrial vertebrates ranging from small mammals, like shrews and rats, to apex predators such as mountain lions.

== Access ==
The reserve was burned in the Dolan Fire in December 2020 and during the following winter debris flows destroyed campgrounds, roads, and trails. Some repairs were completed when severe rain in January 2023 undid those repairs and washed out the primary access road. When open, use of the Landels-Hill Big Creek Reserve is restricted to students, teachers and researchers. The reserve is set aside as an undisturbed sanctuary for approved research or educational purposes.
