= Deetjen's Big Sur Inn =

- U.S. National Register of Historic Places
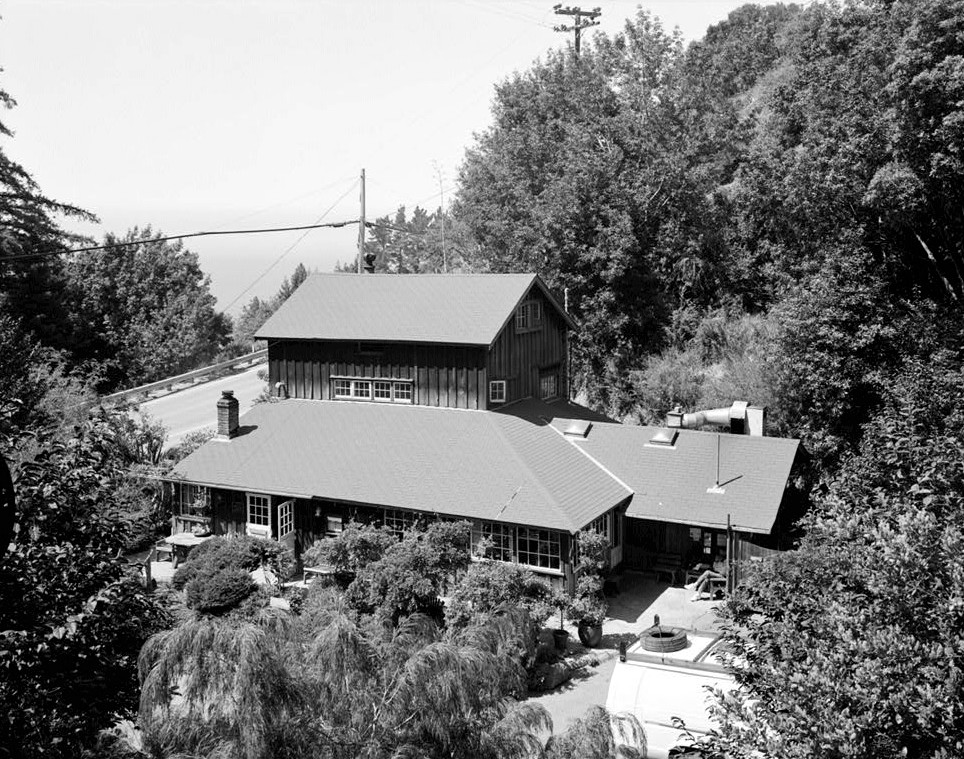
- Historic cabins nestled in Castro Canyon

- Location within California Location within the United States
- Nearest city: Big Sur, California
- Coordinates: 36°13′3.29″N 121°45′0.59″W
- Area: 5 acres (2.0 ha)
- Architect: Helmuth Deetjen
- Architectural style: American Craftsman
- NRHP reference No.: 90001464
- Added to NRHP: September 13, 1990

Deetjen's Big Sur Inn is a collection of single wall buildings, cabins, and a restaurant in Castro Canyon along Highway 1 in Big Sur, California. It was one of the first visitor accommodation to offer overnight lodging and meals in Big Sur for California visitors and travelers after the opening of Highway 1 in 1937.

The initial property was expanded over the years and now consists of several Norwegian style cottages. made with locally milled redwood which gives each room a distinct personality and which is matched with a name. Helmuth Deetjen recreated the building style of his native Norway, contributing to the development of the now-iconic Big Sur building style.

== History ==
Helmuth Deetjen emigrated from Bergen, Norway and arrived in New York City about 1916, where he lived in Brooklyn and worked in construction. He arrived in Carmel and met Helen Haight when Highway 1 was completed in 1937, then employed as a private nurse. She had been born in Georgia and came with her mother and two siblings to California before 1900. She had been a governess for a family in Oakland and later a buyer for the White House department store in San Francisco.

Helmuth Deetjen initially built cottages for others in Carmel, and was attracted to the Big Sur coast that reminded him of Norway. They both liked the Big Sur region and camped along the coast.

In 1926, Helmuth bought 6 acres (2.4 ha) from Castro, whose father David Castro bought the land in the late 1800s. He filled in the ravine in Castro Canyon to create a level construction site. Then he began construction of a building. Helmuth and Helen moved to Big Sur in the early 1930s. They lived in a tent at first, then Helmuth built a large barn of timbers obtained from an obsolete wharf along Cannery Row in Monterey.

He built several small Norwegian style cottages and bought more land, until they owned 40 acres (16 ha). As was the custom of the day, the couple welcomed travelers along the wagon road that connected Big Sur to Monterey, a trip that could take up to three days. On August 22, 1936, they bought an additional 3.95 acres (1.60 ha) of the former Castro Ranch.

They added a restaurant in 1939 run by Helen that became known for its excellent food. Helmuth made and sold hand-carved candle sticks, bowls, benches, tables, as well as cabinets in a shop next to the restaurant. The Deetjens came to be known in the area as "Grandpa" and "Grandma" to everyone. They formally married in early October, 1938.

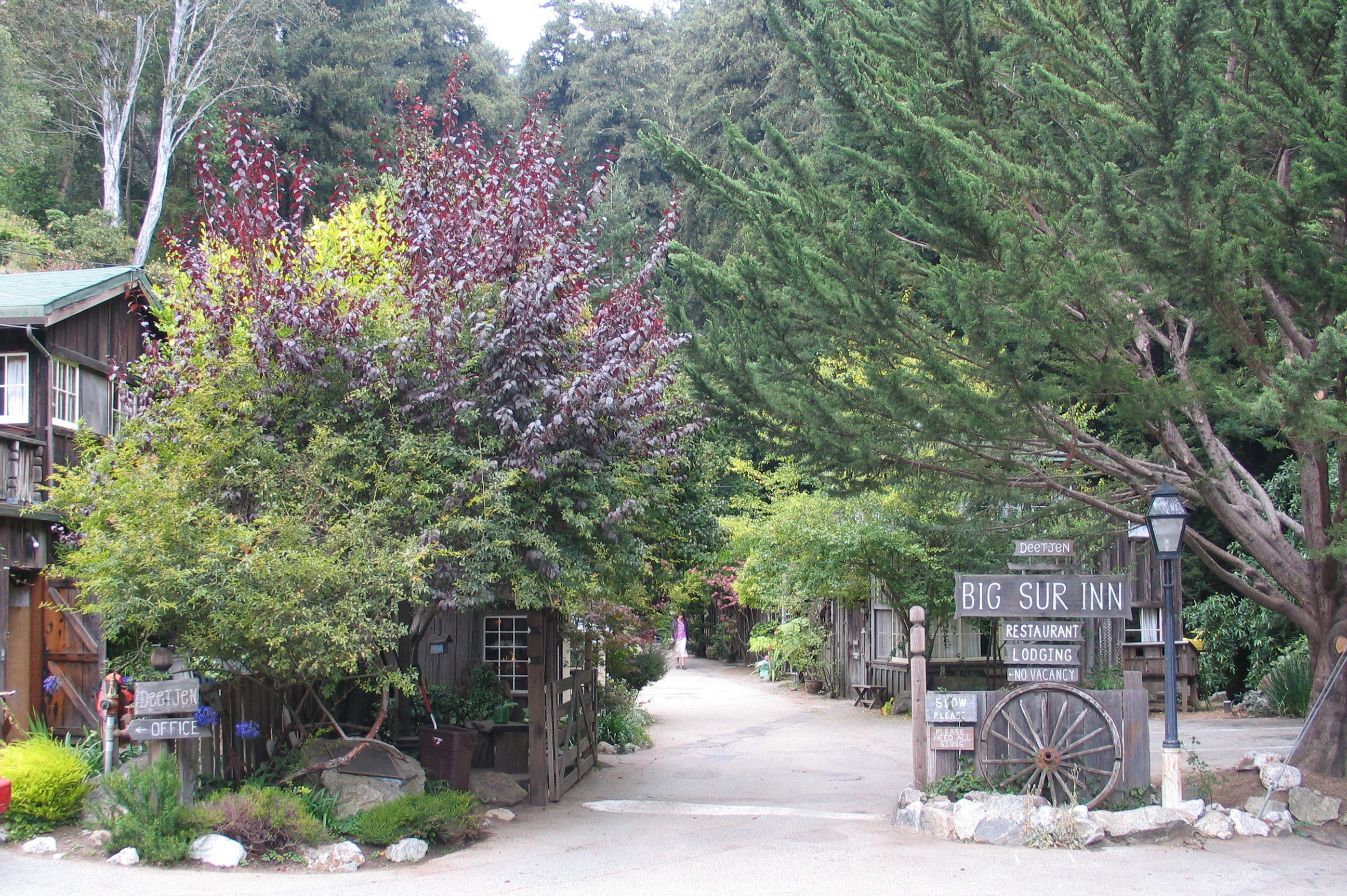
Deetjen's Big Sur Inn, 2005

The Hayloft Building has a number of historic features, including glass Helmuth made himself in King City and brought over the mountains to Big Sur by mule. When Helmuth died in 1972, the inn comprised 20 rooms and 55 acres (22 ha). He directed in his will that the state Department of Parks and Recreation take over the property. The estate trustee next directed that the property be offered to the National Historical Foundation, but they declined. Monterey County was given a chance at the land and buildings, but the Monterey County Parks Department estimated a new water system would cost hundreds of thousands of dollars, and the county rejected the offer. The Board of Supervisors instead asked the Superior Court to permit them to turn it over to a qualified non-profit.

== Present day ==
The land and buildings are owned by Deetjens Big Sur Inn Preservation Foundation Inc, representing Deetjen's estate, whose president is Kent Seavey of Pacific Grove, former curator of the California Historical Society and former director of the Carmel Museum of Art. In 1990 the inn was listed on the National Register of Historic Places.

Like many historic buildings along the Big Sur coast The Inn has faced its share of natural disasters. It was closed due to the Soberanes Fire in 2017 and remained closed due to subsequent damage during the following winter. reopening in December 2020. Frequent Highway 1 blockades from fires and mudslides and other natural disasters continue to make travel difficult, but after structural repairs and restorations, the inn and its restaurant have continued to operate.

== Notes ==
- Molyneaux, David G. (June 26, 1994). "Snuggling Up to Nature at Big Sur". Plain Dealer (Cleveland, Ohio).
