= Pfeiffer Beach =

Beach in California, United States

- Franciscan Complex
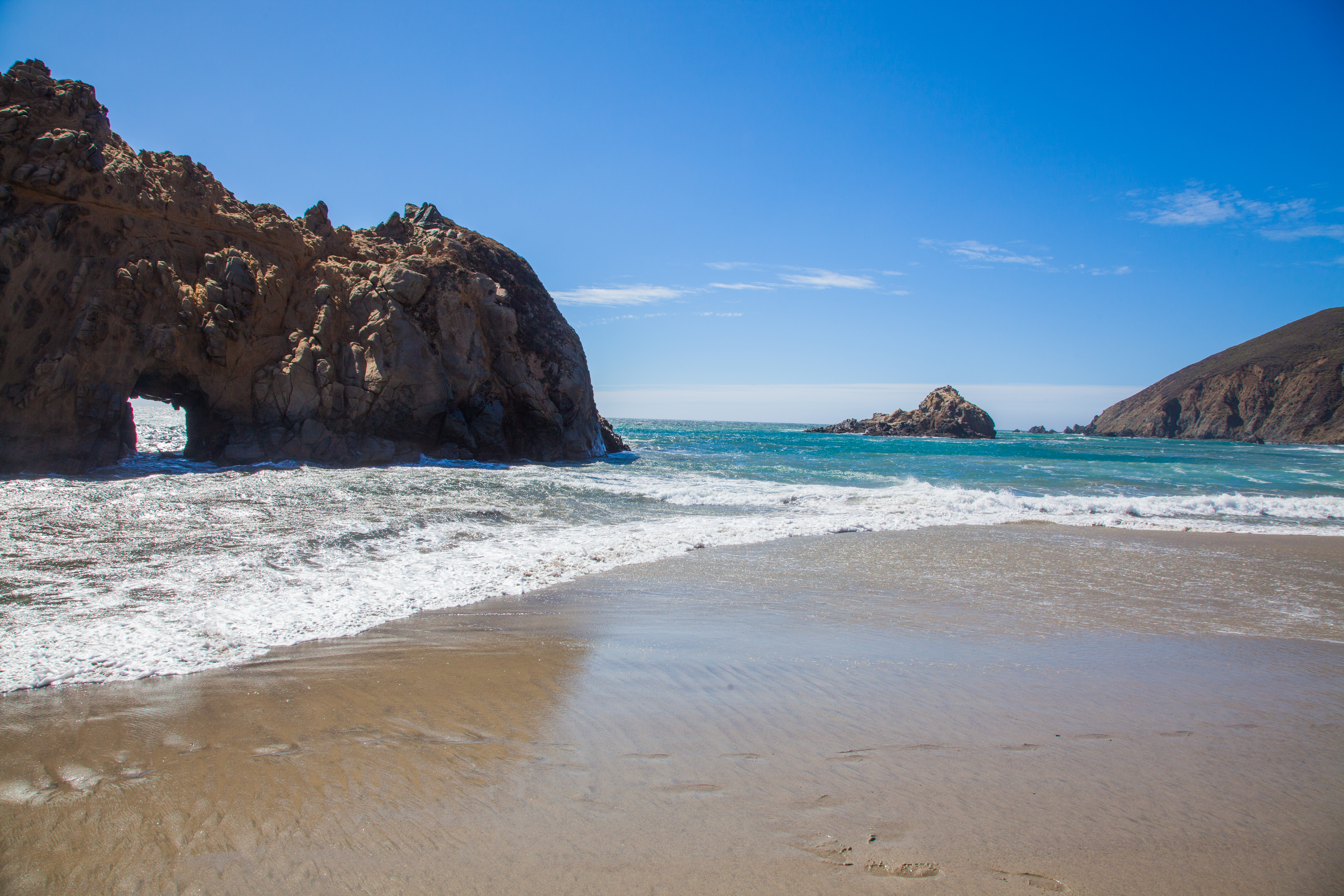

- Location in California
- Coordinates: 36°14′19″N 121°49′03″W
- Location: Big Sur, Monterey County, California
- Age: Cretaceous
- Elevation: 0 m
- Topo map: USGS Pfeiffer Point

Pfeiffer Beach is located in the Big Sur region of California. It is one of the most popular beaches on the Central Coast and is well known for Keyhole Rock, a popular photography subject. On a limited number of days in December and January each year, photographers crowd the beach to obtain pictures of the setting sun visible through the arch. Due to the steep terrain prevalent along the Big Sur coast, it is one of the few ocean access points within Big Sur

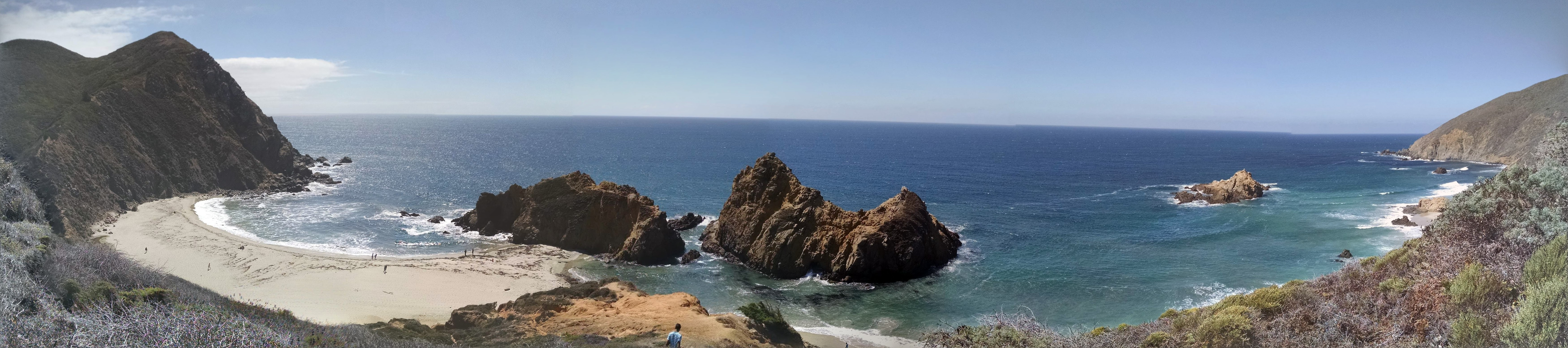
Pfeiffer Beach panorama

The road and the beach are within the Los Padres National Forest. The road is named for the Western Sycamores that grow along the road and near the beach.

The weather from June to August can be foggy and cold, known locally as "June Gloom."

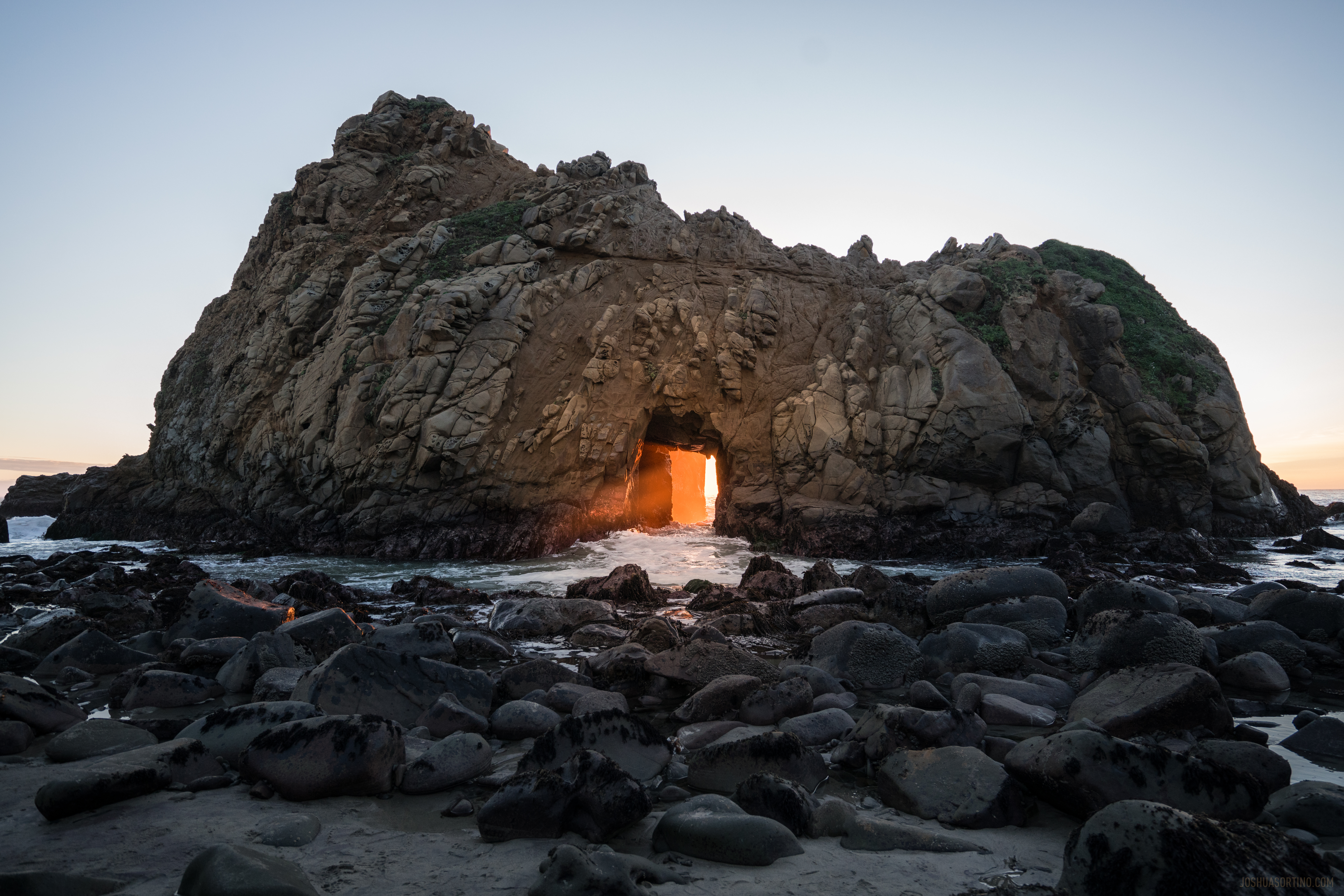
Keyhole arch in offshore rock at sunset.

== Etymology ==
The Pfeiffer family built the first home in Sycamore Canyon near the coast in the winter of 1869. Micheal and Barbara Laquet Pfeiffer were on their way to the south coast of Big Sur when they were forced to stop for the season in Sycamore Canyon. They liked the area so much they decided against moving south again the following spring. Their eight children married and lived in the area for several generations. The family established the Pfeiffer Ranch Resort at their home in 1910. An Esslen midden site is near their home.

Their son John and his wife Zulema Florence Swetnam built a cabin near the north bank of the Big Sur River in 1884. John donated the initial 700 acres (280 ha) of land that became Pfeiffer Big Sur State Park to the state of California.
