= Big Creek Bridge (California) =

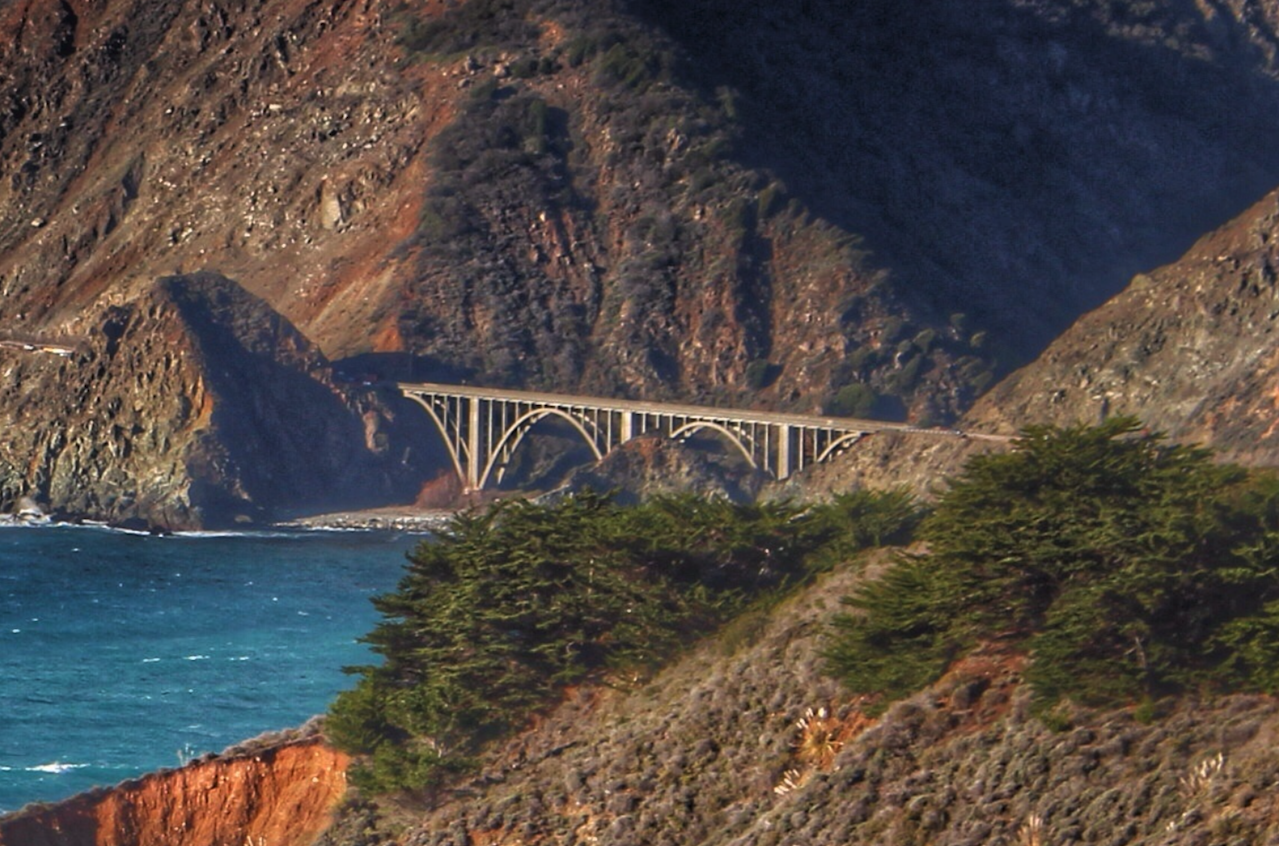
- Big Creek Bridge
- Coordinates: 36°04′12″N 121°36′01″W
- Carries: SR 1
- Crosses: Big Creek Canyon
- Locale: Lucia, Big Sur; Monterey County, California
- Official name: Big Creek Bridge
- Maintained by: California Department of Transportation
- ID number: 44 0056

Characteristics
- Design: Open spandrel concrete arch
- Total length: 589 feet (180 m)
- Width: 24 feet (7 m)
- Longest span: 178 feet (54 m)
- Clearance below: 65 feet (20 m)

History
- Opened: 1938

Location
- Interactive map of Big Creek Bridge

The Big Creek Bridge is a 589-foot (180 m)-long, open spandrel, concrete deck arch bridge located on the southern portion of the Big Sur coast of California, along State Route 1 near Lucia. Opened for traffic in 1938, it crosses Big Creek Canyon on this scenic, mountainous coast.

== History ==
Constructed during the Great Depression and identified by Caltrans as Bridge No. 44 0056, it was opened for traffic in late 1938. Its construction was partially funded by the federal government in connection with the Works Progress Administration. Situated high above Big Creek canyon, this bridge has remained open while many others on the Pacific Coast Highway have been closed due to mud slides. There are parking areas at both ends of the bridge to allow motorists to stop and take photographs.

== Design and construction ==
Its two main spans are open spandrel arches, each 178 feet (54 m) long, while the 116-foot (35 m)-long side arches are cantilevered to the canyon walls. The 24-foot (7.3 m)-wide bridge deck provides for two lanes of traffic and is 65 feet (20 m) above the ground below. Christian Theophil Gutleben, noted for his reinforced concrete arch bridges throughout the California coast and in the Los Angeles area, was the designer. The structure got a seismic retrofit in 1999.

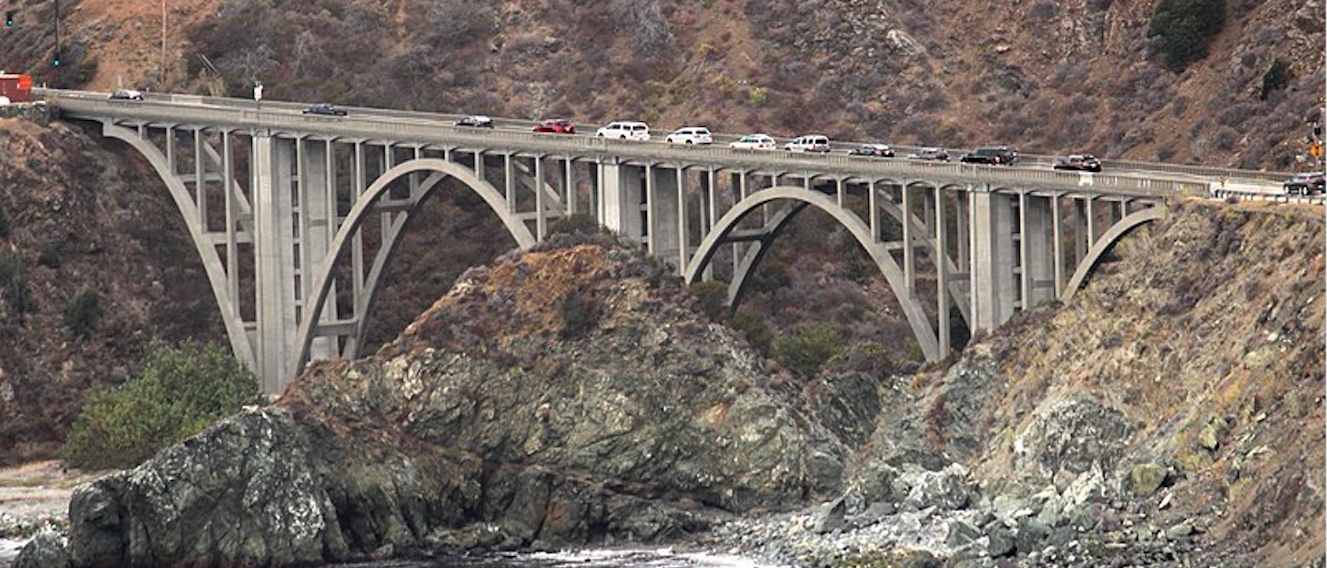
Close-up aerial view of the Big Creek Bridge
