= National Register of Historic Places listings in Monterey County, California =

Location of Monterey County in California

This is a list of the National Register of Historic Places listings in Monterey County, California.

This is intended to be a complete list of the properties and districts on the National Register of Historic Places in Monterey County, California, United States. Latitude and longitude coordinates are provided for many National Register properties and districts; these locations may be seen together in an online map.

There are 64 properties and districts listed on the National Register in the county, including 7 National Historic Landmarks.

This National Park Service list is complete through NPS recent listings posted September 25, 2026.

== Current listings ==
	Name on the Register	Image	Date listed	Location	City or town	Description
1	Asilomar Conference Grounds	Asilomar Conference Grounds	February 27, 1987 (#87000823)	Asilomar Blvd. 36°37′08″N 121°56′16″W	Pacific Grove	Conference complex with 11 contributing properties, established in 1913. Noted for its associations with the YWCA, pioneering female architect Julia Morgan, and the resort industry of the Monterey Peninsula, and for its American Craftsman architecture.
2	Asilomar Conference Grounds Warnecke Historic District		October 11, 2022 (#100008261)	800 Asilomar Blvd. 36°37′09″N 121°56′09″W	Pacific Grove	
3	Berwick Manor and Orchard	Berwick Manor and Orchard	November 17, 1977 (#77000309)	9450 Carmel Valley Rd. 36°31′24″N 121°48′44″W	Carmel Valley	Farmstead acquired in 1869 by Edward Berwick, a prolific writer and educator as well as a scientific farmer.
4	Mary C. W. Black Studio House	Mary C. W. Black Studio House	August 24, 1994 (#94001007)	556 Abrego St. 36°35′50″N 121°53′34″W	Monterey	1930 house and garden wall, a highly intact residential example of the Monterey substyle of Spanish Colonial Revival architecture.
5	Samuel M. Black House	Samuel M. Black House	September 20, 1984 (#84000911)	418 Pajaro St. 36°40′18″N 121°39′08″W	Salinas	1900 house by noted California architect William Henry Weeks; its design and rare surviving plans document the emergence of his popular Modified Colonial style. Listing also includes an adjacent 1936 rental cottage.
6	Peter J. Bontadelli House	Peter J. Bontadelli House	July 15, 1980 (#80000823)	119 Cayuga St. 36°40′32″N 121°39′34″W	Salinas	Monterey County's only historical example of Second Empire architecture, built c. 1907. Now known as The Empire House.
7	Jose Eusebio Boronda Adobe	Jose Eusebio Boronda Adobe	March 20, 1973 (#73000413)	333 Boronda Rd. 36°42′03″N 121°40′44″W	Salinas	Rare surviving rancho adobe of the Salinas Valley, built c. 1846 and associated with the influential Boronda family. Now the centerpiece of the Boronda Adobe History Center.
8	Frank LaVerne Buck House	Frank LaVerne Buck House	September 11, 1986 (#86002401)	581 Pine Ave. 36°37′07″N 121°55′08″W	Pacific Grove	1904 Queen Anne house of Frank Buck (1849–1931), a local civic leader in the early 20th century. One of Pacific Grove's few intact large Victorian homes, associated with local architect Robert C. Gass and builder C.E. Hovey. Now a bed & breakfast.
9	Carmel Mission	Carmel Mission	October 15, 1966 (#66000214)	3080 Rio Rd. 36°32′34″N 121°55′13″W	Carmel-by-the-Sea	Exemplary church dating to 1793—though extensively reconstructed and renovated beginning in 1884—of a mission established by Junípero Serra in 1770. More properly called Mission San Carlos Borroméo del río Carmelo.
10	Carmel Valley Road-Boronda Road Eucalyptus Tree Row	Carmel Valley Road-Boronda Road Eucalyptus Tree Row	January 10, 2008 (#07001352)	Carmel Valley Rd. & Boronda Rd. 36°29′40″N 121°44′49″W	Carmel Valley	Prominent and locally unusual streetside row of Eucalyptus globulus trees, planted sometime between 1874 and 1881 during the species' peak popularity in California for landscaping.
11	Castroville Japanese Language School	Castroville Japanese Language School	October 10, 1995 (#95001127)	11199 Geil St. 36°45′54″N 121°45′05″W	Castroville	1936 multi-purpose facility of a Japanese American farming community whose 1942 abandonment and 1944–45 use as a hostel symbolize the loss of civil rights at the beginning and end of Japanese American internment.
12	Centrella Hotel	Centrella Hotel	October 29, 1982 (#82000973)	612 Central Ave. 36°37′21″N 121°55′06″W	Pacific Grove	Hotel and cottage complex with four contributing properties, established in 1889 and expanded in 1892 and 1905, reflecting Pacific Grove's rapid development as a resort destination.
13	Chautauqua Hall	Chautauqua Hall	January 12, 2026 (#100012539)	162 16th Street; 36°37′20″N 121°55′06″W	Pacific Grove	
14	Community Church of Gonzales	Community Church of Gonzales	September 15, 1983 (#83001210)	301 4th St. 36°30′32″N 121°26′30″W	Gonzales	One of Monterey County's oldest functioning churches, a prominent 1884 Carpenter Gothic church exemplifying a type common to late-19th-century small California towns.
15	Cueva Pintada	Cueva Pintada	February 13, 1975 (#75000445)	Address restricted	Fort Hunter Liggett	Prehistoric rock shelter covered with white, red, black, and ochre pictographs by Salinan people. Protected within Fort Hunter Liggett but generally off-limits.
16	Deetjen's Big Sur Inn	Deetjen's Big Sur Inn	September 13, 1990 (#90001464)	48865 Highway 1; 36°13′03″N 121°45′03″W	Big Sur	One of the first visitor accommodations on the Carmel-San Simeon Highway, whose rustic ambience shaped recreational development of the Big Sur. Nomination includes five original buildings constructed 1936–1941.
17	Dutton Hotel, Stagecoach Station	Dutton Hotel, Stagecoach Station	October 14, 1971 (#71000166)	King City-Jolon Rd. 35°58′29″N 121°10′33″W	Jolon	Ruins of an adobe inn established in 1849, a major stagecoach stop on El Camino Real and nucleus of the town of Jolon.
18	El Castillo	El Castillo	November 23, 1971 (#71000167)	Lower Presidio Historic Park; 36°36′22″N 121°53′43″W	Monterey	Site of a 1792 Spanish fort and a prehistoric shell midden.
19	James W. Finch House	James W. Finch House	October 19, 1982 (#82000974)	410 Monroe St. 36°36′04″N 121°54′05″W	Monterey	One of the few intact examples of early American architecture in Monterey, built in 1870.
20	Fort Ord Station Veterinary Hospital	Fort Ord Station Veterinary Hospital	June 17, 2014 (#14000305)	2872 5th Ave. 36°39′45″N 121°47′57″W	Marina	One of the nation's last constructed and last surviving equestrian veterinary complexes of the U.S. Army, active 1941–46, symbolizing the final years of horse-dependent warfare. Now the Marina Equestrian Center.
21	Gabilan Lodge No. 372-Independent Order of Odd Fellows	Gabilan Lodge No. 372-Independent Order of Odd Fellows	October 2, 1986 (#86002813)	117 Fourth St. 36°30′28″N 121°26′37″W	Gonzales	1914 Independent Order of Odd Fellows hall, noted for its architectural and social prominence in Gonzales.
22	Jose Mario Gil Adobe		June 7, 1974 (#74000537)	Hunter Liggett Military Reservation; 35°57′39″N 121°11′18″W	Jolon	1865 rancho adobe exemplifying the architecture and cattle ranching economy of the Salinas Valley prior to irrigation-dependent vegetable farming.
23	Gosby House Inn	Gosby House Inn	December 2, 1980 (#80000822)	643 Lighthouse Ave. 36°37′18″N 121°55′10″W	Pacific Grove	1887 inn which evolved architecturally and commercially, from a vernacular boarding house serving a religious retreat to a Queen Anne hotel catering to vacationers. Still operating as a bed & breakfast.
24	Robinson Jeffers House	Robinson Jeffers House	October 10, 1975 (#75000444)	26304 Ocean View Ave. 36°32′31″N 121°55′56″W	Carmel-by-the-Sea	Longtime home of poet Robinson Jeffers (1887–1962), featuring a granite masonry house and 40-foot (12 m) tower he largely hand built beginning in 1919. Now a non-profit historic attraction known as Tor House and Hawk Tower. Designated a National Historic Landmark in 2024.
25	King City Joint Union High School Auditorium	King City Joint Union High School Auditorium	July 23, 1991 (#91000917)	720 Broadway St. 36°12′37″N 121°07′59″W	King City	Prominent 1939 auditorium significant for its Streamline Modern design by architect Robert Stanton and ornamentation by sculptor Jo Mora.
26	Kirk Creek Campground	Kirk Creek Campground	December 31, 1974 (#74000538)	Address restricted	Lucia	The best preserved and documented archaeological site dating to the Middle Period of the Big Sur.
27	Krough House	Krough House	January 18, 1982 (#82002209)	146 Central Ave. 36°40′36″N 121°39′36″W	Salinas	One of four surviving examples of the Queen Anne houses that characterized Central Avenue in the 1890s.
28	Larkin House	Larkin House	October 15, 1966 (#66000215)	464 Calle Principal; 36°35′53″N 121°53′46″W	Monterey	1835 house of American merchant Thomas O. Larkin, which combined Spanish Colonial adobe materials with New England frame construction to originate the Monterey Colonial architecture style. Now a house museum of Monterey State Historic Park.
29	Los Coches Rancho		January 31, 1979 (#79000502)	1 mi (1.6 km) S of Soledad on U.S. 101; 36°24′15″N 121°19′04″W	Soledad	1841 adobe and outbuildings that served as a stagecoach stop on El Camino Real 1848–1880s. Also significant for its prehistoric and historic archaeological resources.
30	G. T. Marsh and Sons	G. T. Marsh and Sons	August 8, 2007 (#05001113)	599 Fremont St. 36°35′43″N 121°53′22″W	Monterey	1927 Asian art gallery significant for its prominent and unique use of Sichuan-style Chinese architecture.
31	Josiah Merritt Adobe	Josiah Merritt Adobe	November 22, 1977 (#77000311)	386 Pacific St. 36°36′02″N 121°53′46″W	Monterey	Adobe given a unique Greek Revival façade in the 1850s, when notable American settler Josiah Merritt—co-organizer and first judge of Monterey County—moved in. Now a boutique hotel.
32	Milpitas Ranchhouse	Milpitas Ranchhouse	December 2, 1977 (#77000310)	Infantry Rd. 36°00′37″N 121°14′34″W	Fort Hunter Liggett	1930 ranch house designed by Julia Morgan in Mission Revival style for William Randolph Hearst's northern estate. Now a hotel and recreation facility within Fort Hunter Liggett known as The Hacienda.
33	Mission Nuestra Senora de la Soledad Historic District	Mission Nuestra Senora de la Soledad Historic District	June 27, 2014 (#14000344)	36641 Fort Romie Rd. 36°24′18″N 121°21′21″W	Soledad	Ruins of a Spanish mission with 14 contributing properties built 1791–1850, including the grave of Governor José Joaquín de Arrillaga (1750–1814) and two buildings reconstructed 1954–1962 by expert restorer Harry Downie.
34	Monterey County Court House	Monterey County Court House	January 8, 2009 (#08000878)	240 Church St. 36°40′25″N 121°39′31″W	Salinas	1937 courthouse significant as an example of WPA Moderne architecture and the collaboration of architect Robert Stanton and artist Jo Mora.
35	Monterey County Jail	Monterey County Jail	September 24, 2004 (#04001028)	142 W. Alisal St. 36°40′25″N 121°39′34″W	Salinas	Jail where agricultural labor leader Cesar Chavez was incarcerated in December 1970, bringing major attention to the United Farm Workers movement,
36	Monterey Old Town Historic District	Monterey Old Town Historic District	April 15, 1970 (#70000137)	Boundary undetermined at this time 36°36′11″N 121°53′39″W	Monterey	Several dozen buildings dating to Monterey's years as the Spanish and Mexican capital of Alta California and the major European stronghold on the West Coast. District includes Monterey State Historic Park.
37	Sheriff William Joseph Nesbitt House	Sheriff William Joseph Nesbitt House	February 19, 1982 (#82002210)	66 Capitol St. 36°40′36″N 121°39′40″W	Salinas	Rare surviving example of the vernacular houses common to California's latter-19th-century settlement, and home 1881–1933 of a notable local lawman.
38	Olvida Peñas	Olvida Peñas	April 3, 1978 (#78000721)	1061 Majella Rd. 36°36′22″N 121°56′12″W	Pebble Beach	1926 house—whose name means "Forget pain"—noted for its singular use of Mexican vernacular architecture and adherence to the community planning strictures of Pebble Beach.
39	Outlands in the Eighty Acres	Outlands in the Eighty Acres	March 23, 1989 (#89000228)	25800 Hatton Rd. 36°32′54″N 121°55′00″W	Carmel-by-the-Sea	1925 Tudor Revival house also known as the Flanders Mansion, significant as a work of architect Henry Higby Gutterson and for its innovative construction with precast concrete blocks. Now preserved within Mission Trail Park.
40	Pacific Biological Laboratories	Pacific Biological Laboratories	December 29, 1994 (#94001498)	800 Cannery Row; 36°37′02″N 121°54′04″W	Monterey	1937 laboratory of marine biologist Ed Ricketts (1897–1948), friend and collaborator of author John Steinbeck and frequent host to Monterey's intelligentsia.
41	Lou Ellen Parmelee House	Lou Ellen Parmelee House	January 7, 1998 (#97001633)	570 Archer St. 36°36′40″N 121°54′19″W	Monterey	Monterey's leading residential example of high Queen Anne style, built in 1896, with finely crafted elements like interior plaster decoration.
42	Pinnacles National Park Roads	Pinnacles National Park Roads	November 14, 2022 (#100008339)	5000 East Entrance Rd., Pinnacles National Park; 36°29′45″N 121°08′41″W	Paicines	
43	Point Pinos Lighthouse	Point Pinos Lighthouse	July 14, 1977 (#77000312)	Asilomar Blvd. and Lighthouse Ave. 36°38′00″N 121°56′01″W	Pacific Grove	The oldest continuously operating lighthouse on the West Coast, established in 1855. Open for tours.
44	Point Sur Light Station	Point Sur Light Station	September 3, 1991 (#91001097)	Morro Rock on Point Sur, 0.5 mi (0.80 km) W of CA 1; 36°18′23″N 121°54′06″W	Big Sur	Lighthouse complex established in 1899, particularly noted for retaining all of its major original buildings and for its Romanesque Revival architecture. Now preserved within Point Sur State Historic Park.
45	Porter-Vallejo Mansion	Porter-Vallejo Mansion	January 4, 1990 (#89002273)	29 Bishop St. 36°54′06″N 121°44′58″W	Pajaro	Home 1874–1900 of John T. Porter, an influential local financier and benefactor of Chinese immigrants. Its 1895–99 remodelling is also significant as an early work of architect William Henry Weeks.
46	Joseph W. Post House	Joseph W. Post House	September 12, 1985 (#85002196)	CA 1; 36°13′45″N 121°45′52″W	Big Sur	House dating to 1867 of one of the first American families to homestead the Big Sur coast, with a New England-style saltbox wing built in 1877. Now part of the Ventana Inn resort.
47	Rancho Las Palmas	Rancho Las Palmas	November 20, 1978 (#78000722)	S of Salinas at 200 River Rd. 36°37′16″N 121°40′14″W	Salinas	1891 house of Hiram Corey, one of Monterey County's most successful stock farmers of the late 19th century. Also noted for its exemplary Queen Anne style in a rural setting.
48	Rancho San Lucas		May 6, 1991 (#91000530)	1.75 miles (2.82 km) SW of junction of Paris Valley Rd. and Rancho San Lucas entry road 36°02′40″N 121°00′31″W	San Lucas	Monterey County's best preserved large ranch dating to a transition period between stock raising and cereal farming, with eight contributing properties built 1865–1888. Also associated with influential local entrepreneur Alberto Trescony (c. 1812–1892).
49	Reimers' Stonehouse Terrace		October 2, 2026 (#100013448)	2 SW 7th on San Carlos Street; 36°33′14″N 121°55′18″W	Carmel-by-the-Sea	
50	Republic Cafe	Republic Cafe	July 14, 2011 (#11000430)	37 Soledad St. 36°40′43″N 121°39′07″W	Salinas	Asian restaurant and banquet hall in operation 1942–1988, a rare surviving commercial building of the Salinas Chinatown.
51	Royal Presidio Chapel	Royal Presidio Chapel	October 15, 1966 (#66000216)	550 Church St. 36°35′44″N 121°53′25″W	Monterey	California's only surviving presidio chapel and Monterey's only surviving 18th-century building, dating to 1794. Also known as the Cathedral of San Carlos Borromeo.
52	St. John's Chapel, Del Monte	St. John's Chapel, Del Monte	October 21, 2020 (#100005719)	1490 Mark Thomas Dr. 36°35′37″N 121°52′21″W	Monterey	Built in 1891 by Charles Crocker and Collis P. Huntington for guests at the Hotel Del Monte.
53	San Antonio de Padua Mission	San Antonio de Padua Mission	April 26, 1976 (#76000504)	NW of Jolon off Del Venturi Rd. 36°00′55″N 121°15′01″W	Jolon	Third of the Spanish missions in California and one of the few to retain its rural character. Founded in 1771, with a church dating to 1810.
54	B. V. Sargent House	B. V. Sargent House	October 20, 1980 (#80000824)	154 Central Ave. 36°40′35″N 121°39′37″W	Salinas	1896 house exemplifying the early Modified Colonial style of architect William Henry Weeks.
55	Site Number 4 Mnt 85	Site Number 4 Mnt 85	October 29, 1976 (#76000502)	Address restricted	Greenfield	Prehistoric site
56	John Steinbeck House	John Steinbeck House	August 8, 2000 (#00000856)	132 Central Ave. 36°40′36″N 121°39′33″W	Salinas	Birthplace and family home of John Steinbeck (1902–1968), inhabited by the author off and on up to 1935. Also noted for its Queen Anne architecture. Now a restaurant and house museum.
57	Stevenson House	Stevenson House	January 7, 1972 (#72000239)	530 Houston St. 36°35′50″N 121°53′36″W	Monterey	Boarding house called the French Hotel where Scottish author Robert Louis Stevenson lived in autumn 1879, writing and courting his future wife. Now a museum property of Monterey State Historic Park.
58	Sunset Center	Sunset Center	January 9, 1998 (#97001604)	San Carlos St., between 8th and 10th Sts. 36°33′05″N 121°55′16″W	Carmel-by-the-Sea	Public school whose 1931 auditorium served as Carmel's primary artistic, civic, and social venue. Also noted for its Collegiate Gothic architecture.
59	Tidball Store	Tidball Store	December 12, 1976 (#76000503)	Jolon Rd. 35°58′16″N 121°10′29″W	Jolon	General store established in 1890, the only standing commercial building of Jolon, once a major community of southern Monterey County.
60	Trimmer Hill	Trimmer Hill	June 28, 1982 (#82002208)	230 6th St. 36°37′05″N 121°54′40″W	Pacific Grove	1893 house noted for its exemplary Queen Anne architecture and association with Dr. Oliver Smith Trimmer, who helped develop Pacific Grove as its long-serving first mayor.
61	U.S. Customhouse	U.S. Customhouse	October 15, 1966 (#66000217)	Calle Principal at Decatur St. 36°36′12″N 121°53′37″W	Monterey	Custom house built in stages 1827–1846, nominated as a leading example of Monterey Colonial architecture applied to a public building. Now a museum property of Monterey State Historic Park.
62	USS MACON (airship remains)	USS MACON (airship remains)	January 29, 2010 (#09001274)	In the waters of Monterey Bay National Marine Sanctuary	Big Sur	Nation's only documented remains of a rigid airship, which was launched in 1933 and sank after crash landing in 1935, contributing to the cancellation of the U.S. Navy's rigid airship program.
63	Mrs. Clinton Walker House	Mrs. Clinton Walker House	September 19, 2016 (#16000634)	26336 Scenic Rd. 36°32′41″N 121°55′53″W	Carmel-by-the-Sea	Ship-like house designed by Frank Lloyd Wright and completed in 1952; the architect's only Usonian house in a coastal setting.
64	Whalers Cabin	Whalers Cabin	May 9, 2007 (#07000406)	Point Lobos State Natural Reserve, 4 mi (6.4 km) S of Carmel; 36°31′08″N 121°56′26″W	Carmel-by-the-Sea	Cabin whose site may yield evidence of an early ethnic community established around 1850 by either Portuguese whalers or Chinese fishermen. Now a museum within Point Lobos State Natural Reserve.

== See also ==
- List of National Historic Landmarks in California
- National Register of Historic Places listings in California
- California Historical Landmarks in Monterey County, California
