= Merritt House =

Merritt House may refer to:

- Merritt House (Greenbrier, Arkansas), listed on the National Register of Historic Places (NRHP) in Faulkner County
- S.D. Merritt House, Greenbrier, Arkansas, NRHP-listed in Faulkner County
- Josiah Merritt Adobe, Monterey, California, also known as Merritt House, NRHP-listed in Monterey County
- Dallam-Merritt House, San Francisco, California, NRHP-listed in San Francisco
- Merritt-Ragan House, Hawkinsville, Georgia, NRHP-listed in Pulaski County
- Merritt-Hardin House, Bowling Green, Kentucky, NRHP-listed in Warren County
- Captain Merritt House, Bath, Maine, NRHP-listed in Sagadahoc County, Maine
- Merritt-Winstead House, Roxboro, North Carolina, NRHP-listed in Person County
- John W. Merritt House and Store, Central Point, Oregon, NRHP-listed in Jackson County
- Samuel T. Merritt House, Hudson, Wisconsin, NRHP-listed in St. Croix County
