= Centrella =

Centrella may refer to:

- Centrella, a food brand name used by the Central Grocers Cooperative in Illinois
- Centrella Inn, a complex of historic buildings in Pacific Grove, California
- Joan Centrella, American astrophysicist
