= Joseph W. Post House =

Historic house located on the Big Sur, California

- U.S. National Register of Historic Places
- Post Ranch House
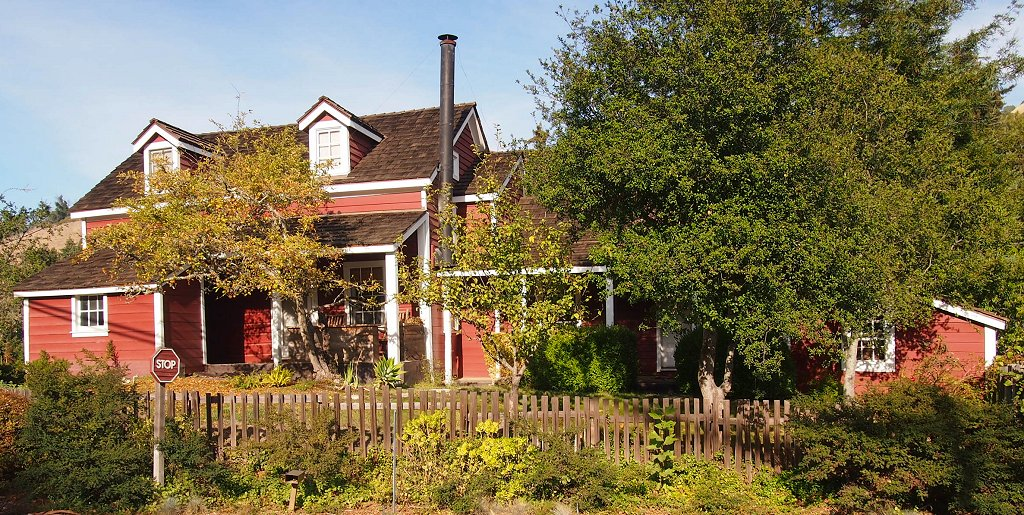
- Joseph W. Post House

- Location within California
- Location: California State Route 1, Posts, California, US
- Nearest city: Big Sur, California
- Coordinates: 36°13′45″N 121°45′52″W
- Built: 1867
- Architectural style: American colonial
- NRHP reference No.: 85002196
- Added to NRHP: September 12, 1985

Joseph W. Post House is historic house located on the Highway 1 in Posts Summit, approximately four miles to the south of Big Sur, California. Erected in 1867, the homestead evolved through five generations of the Post family settling the Big Sur coast in California. The House was placed on the National Register of Historic Places on September 12, 1985.

== History ==
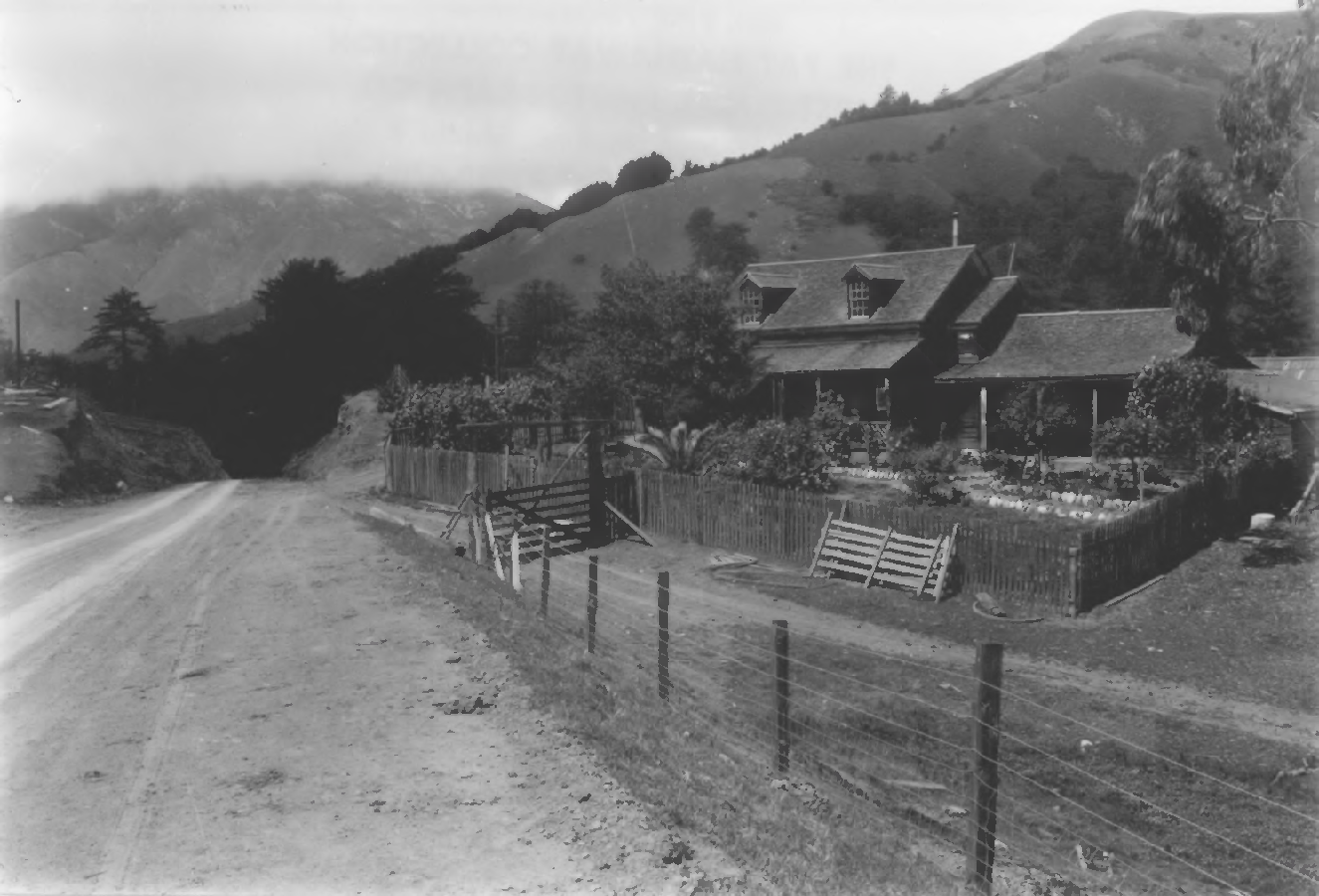
Post Ranch homestead on Highway 1 circa 1930

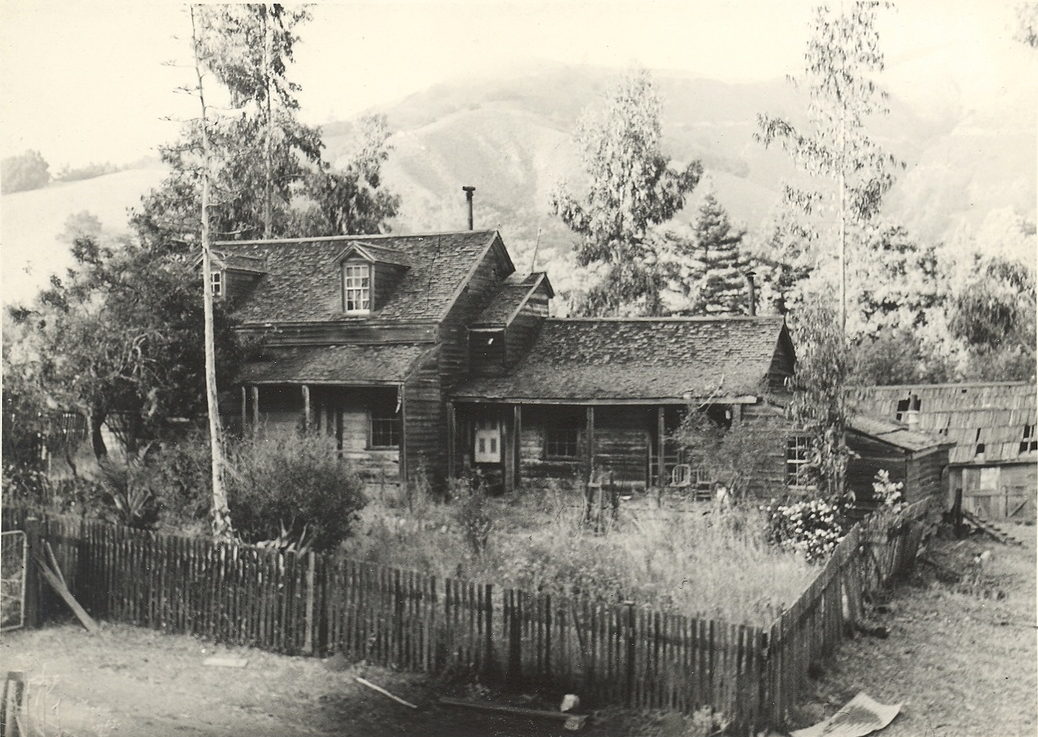
Post Ranch Inn 1920

In 1848, William Brainard "W.B." Post (1830-1908) came to California after a voyage around the Horn of Africa from his native Connecticut, making landfall in Monterey. From 1848 to 1850, he worked at a whaling station near Point Lobos, spending half a year at sea. He then found employment on the James Meadows' Ranch in Carmel Valley. In 1850, he married Anselma Onésimo, a Christianized Carmel Mission Rumsen Native American girl and the sister-in-law of Meadows.

Post decided to obtain land in the Big Sur region and filed a Homestead patent for 640 acres (260 ha) below Sycamore Canyon, at the end of the existing, making him one of the Big Sur region's first homesteaders. In 1867, the Post Ranch House was built as one-story house using locally sourced redwood, split and planed by hand on the premises. Across successive generations, the Post family extended and enhanced the original home. An addition was the construction of a two-story wing to the north in 1877, reflecting the New England design of a Saltbox-style house. The initial Post Homestead had a trail from Monterey to the Big Sur region. The trail was gradually improved and made into a road when Monterey County declared the Old Coast Road a public road in 1885.

== Design ==
The Homestead House is crafted from redwood, with horizontal sidings, including hand-split and planed lap, as well as milled drop siding. The house, irregular in plan, rests on a foundation made of mud sill and has several low and steep-pitched gable and shed roofs, all covered with wood shingles. The initial structure was built in 1867 and comprised a rectangular, one-story, single-room dwelling, complemented at the southeast by a shed-roofed sleeping area. The gently sloped gable roof extended on both sides, stretching into open porch roofs upheld by vertical wooden posts. Entry to the connected shed-roofed section was through an outdoor door, situated at the juncture of the porch roof on the southwest side and the shed roof on the southeast. A raised wooden porch is still visible on the rear (northeast) of the building. On the front (southwest) side, the initial wooden porch has been substituted with a poured concrete stoop, completed before 1955. The windows consist of consistently designed 6/6 double-hung sashes, with a single window present on both the front and rear and on each side of the shed. On the front elevation, there are three manufactured doors with screen doors, and at the rear, there is one door.

In 1877, Post expanded the original house by adding a wing. To provide access to the second story, he integrated a stairway into the existing northwest end of the one-story building. The stairwell has hand-hewn horizontal lap siding. The roof has a gable with a six-paned window at the rear (northeast), illuminating the stairwell. After 1922, a manufactured four-panel inverted cruciform door was installed. The two-story addition follows the design of a classic New England Saltbox-style, enhanced by two gabled dormers incorporated into the roofline on the front elevation (southwest). The only alteration from the Saltbox design is a porch roof, enclosed at the northwest end, and initially clad with horizontal siding where it joined the original house. This porch is supported by vertical posts.

The arrangement of windows in the new wing originally consisted of uniformly 6/6 double-hung sash windows, but after 1922, modifications were made on the second floor, replacing them with 2/3 fixed windows. Later, a small single-pane square stationary window was installed to the southeast end of the second story, positioned above the enclosed stairwell. Additionally, a small rectangular single-pane awning window was installed at the rear (northeast) of the wing, facing southeast. Access to the two-story wing at the front is provided by a single four-panel wood door, situated above a raised wooden porch. There are two original chimneys, one is situated in the original house, that goes through roofline to the rear (southeast) near the shed appendage. The second chimney is located at the rear of the two-story wing, close to the ridgeline next to the enclosed stairwell. While there have been no significant changes to the outside of the compound, successive occupants have made alterations to the interior over time.

== Historically significant ==
The Joseph W. Post House holds historical significance due to its association with the exploration and settlement of the Big Sur region. Key events contributing to its importance include the construction of the Point Sur Lighthouse in 1888, the first postal service to the area in 1889, and the construction of the Big Sur School in the 1890s. Furthermore, the homestead is architecturally noteworthy for featuring a traditional New England-style Saltbox structure, designed in 1876 to reflect the family's Connecticut origins. On September 12, 1985, the Joseph W. Post House was listed on the National Register of Historic Places.

== See also ==
- National Register of Historic Places listings in Monterey County, California
