= Gosby House Inn =

Historic building in California

- U.S. National Register of Historic Places
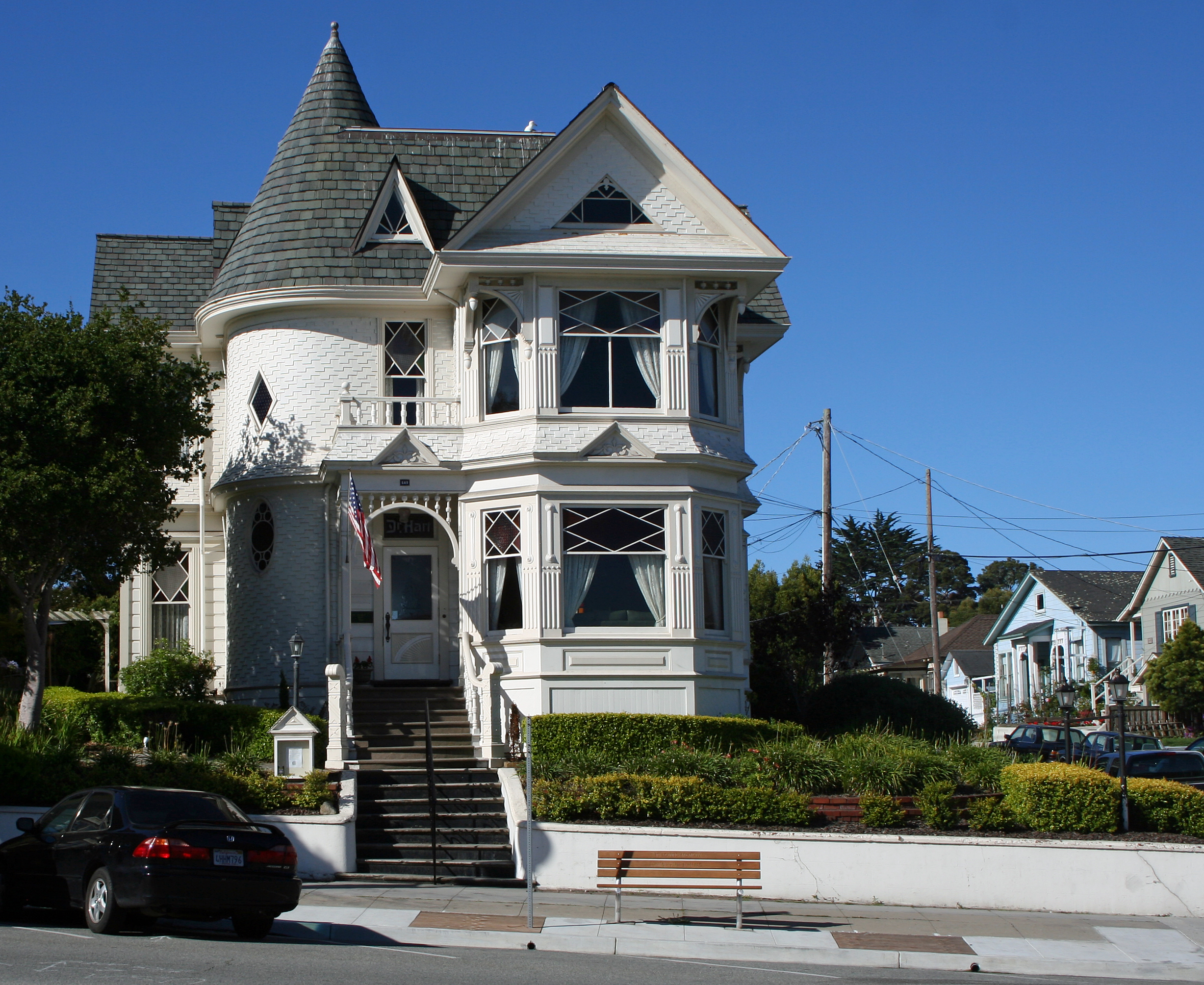
- Gosby House Inn in 2010

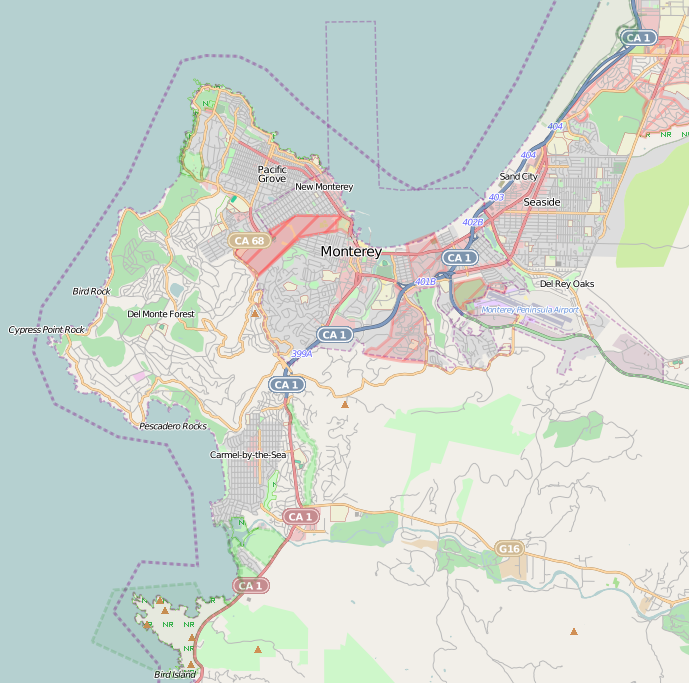
- Location within Monterey Peninsula
- Location: 643 Lighthouse Ave., Pacific Grove
- Coordinates: 36°37′18″N 121°55′10″W
- Built: 1887
- Architectural style: Queen Anne
- NRHP reference No.: 80000822
- Added to NRHP: December 2, 1980

The Gosby House Inn, in Pacific Grove, California, is a two-story Victorian mansion that was built in 1887 by J.F. Gosby. The Inn evolved architecturally in stages, from a vernacular boarding house serving a religious retreat to a Queen Anne hotel catering to vacationers. The Victorian was listed on the National Register of Historic Places of local significance category on December 2, 1980.

== History ==
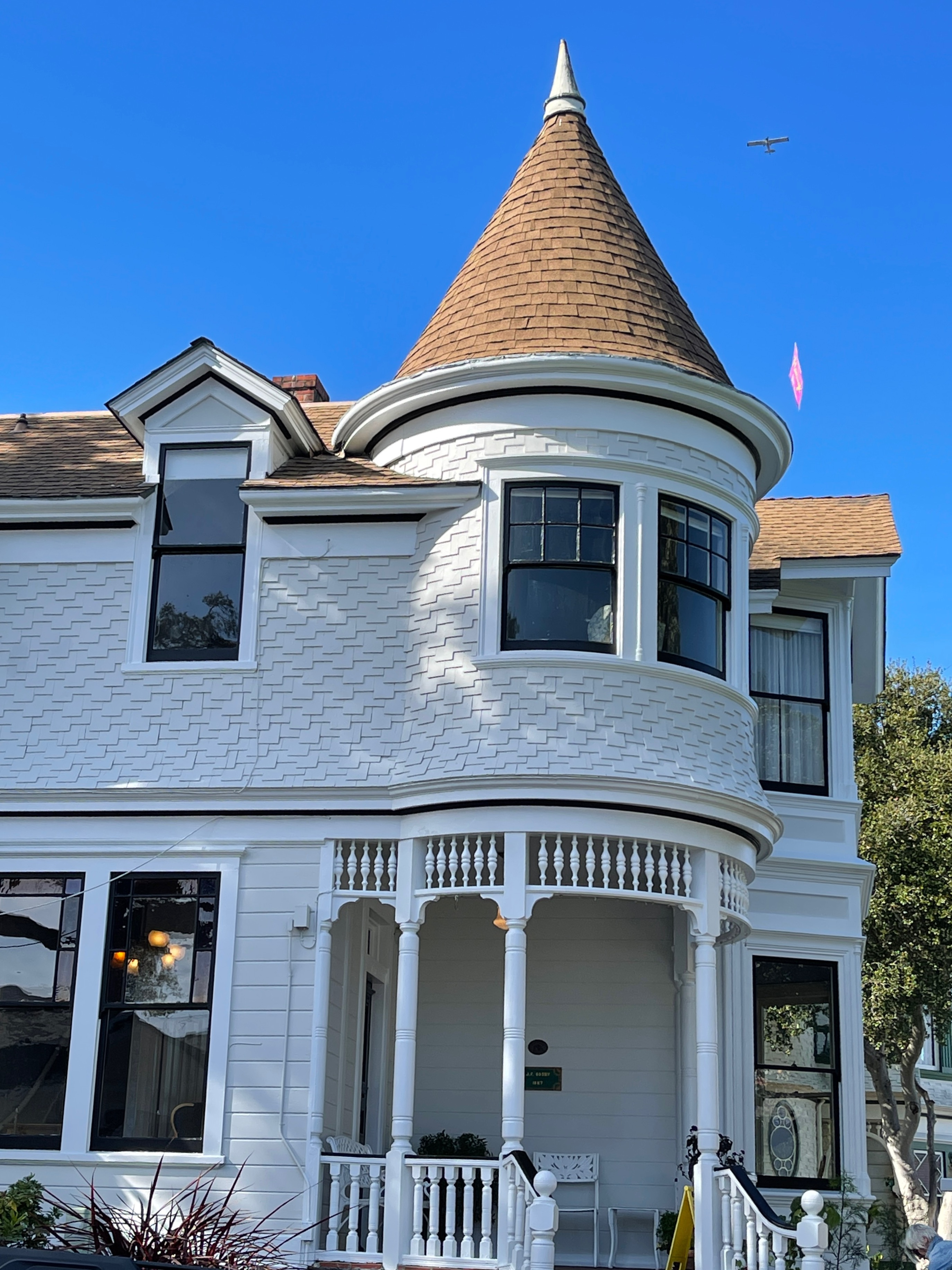
Gosby House Inn Queen Ann-style tower in 2022.

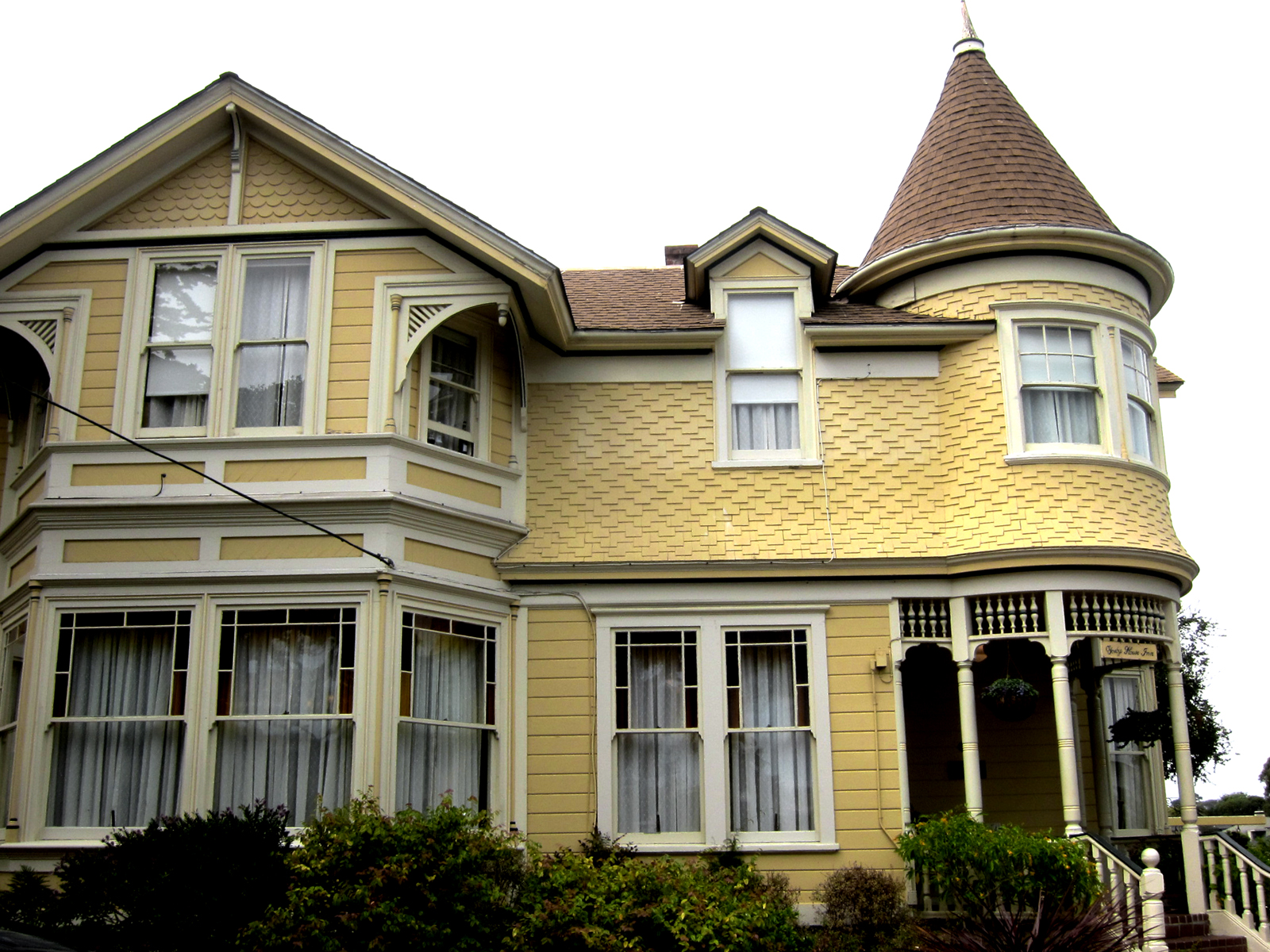
Gosby House Inn in 2014.

The Gosby House Inn was built by J. F. Gosby, a native of Nova Scotia and a cobbler by trade. He began building the home in 1886 and took up residence there in 1888. Gosby opened his home to seasonal visitors attending Methodist religious and educational meetings held all summer long in Pacific Grove, California. Gosby enlarged the inn several times. The inn is an example of the Queen Anne style architecture, with a rounded corner Queen Ann-style tower, and bay windows.

The inn dates to the days when Pacific Grove was the western headquarters for the Chautauqua Movement. Members of the Methodist Church founded a community that gave way to Victorian cottages in the area between Lighthouse Avenue and the ocean.

In the 1920s, the inn was called the El Carmelo Hotel by previous owners, to attract attention from Carmel's tourism. Roger and Sally Post bought the inn in 1978. They restored the inn to its original color and changed the named to the Gosby House Inn. The interior has been decorated with antiques. The exterior, with stained glass windows, bay windows, and gable roofs.

== See also ==
- Pacific Grove, California
- National Register of Historic Places listings in Monterey County, California
