= Cueva Pintada (California) =

Prehistoric rock shelter in King City, California

- U.S. National Register of Historic Places
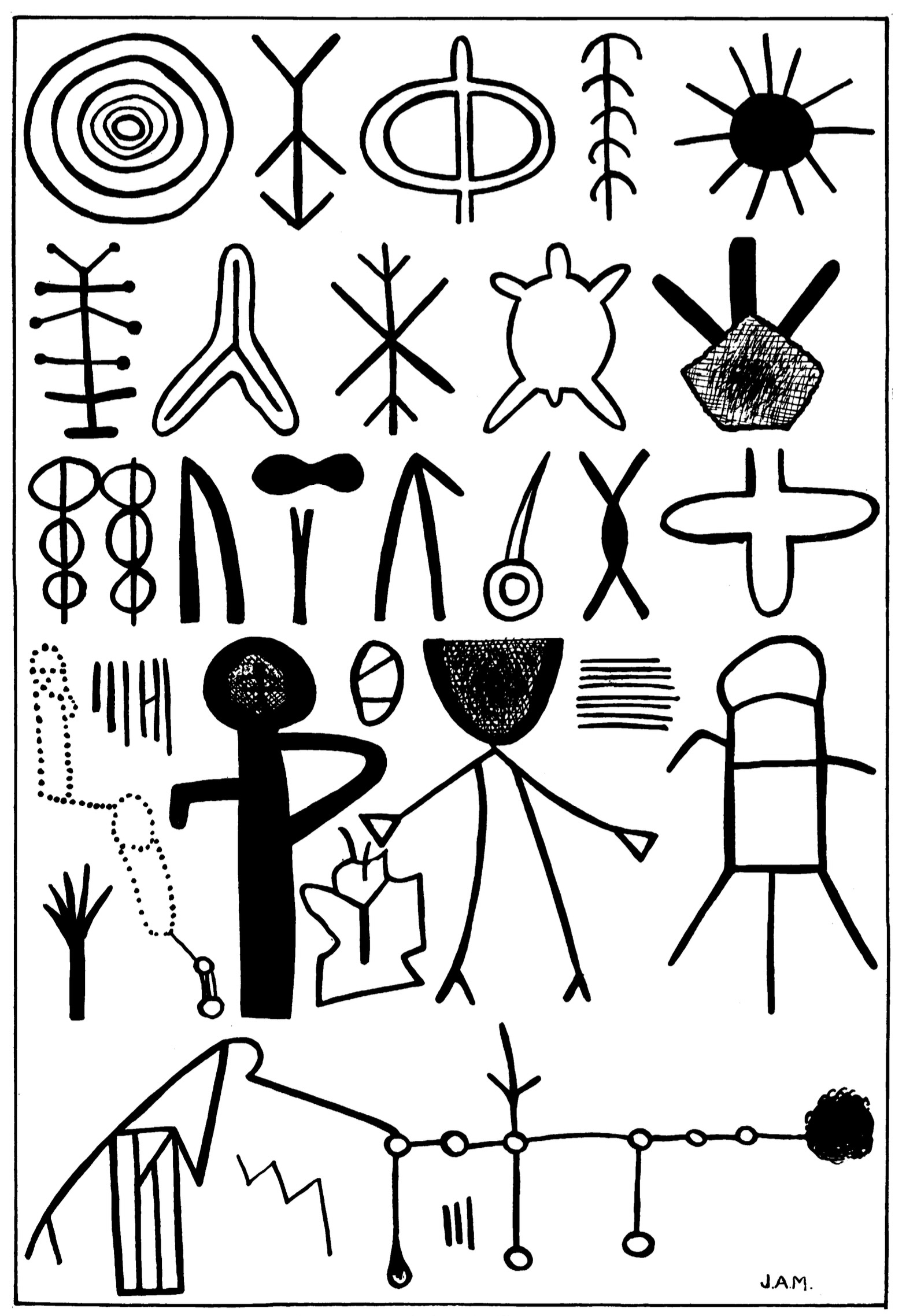
- Pictographs from Cueva Pintada (1912)

- Location within California
- Location: King City, California
- Coordinates: 35°59′24″N 121°29′44″W
- Built
- NRHP reference No.: 75000445
- Added to NRHP: February 13, 1975

Cueva Pintada, locally known as La Cueva Pintada, (in Spanish means "the painted cave"), is a well preserved prehistoric rock shelter covered with white, red, black, and ochre pictographs created by the Salinan people. The site is protected within Fort Hunter Liggett, located about 10 miles (16 km) southwest of King City, California, United States. Cueva Pintada was listed on the National Register of Historic Places on February 13, 1975.

== History ==
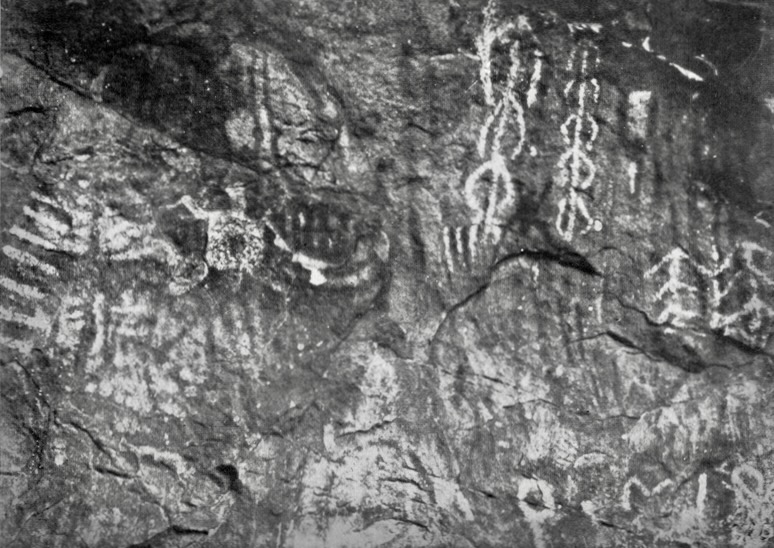
Pictographs from La Cueva Pintada

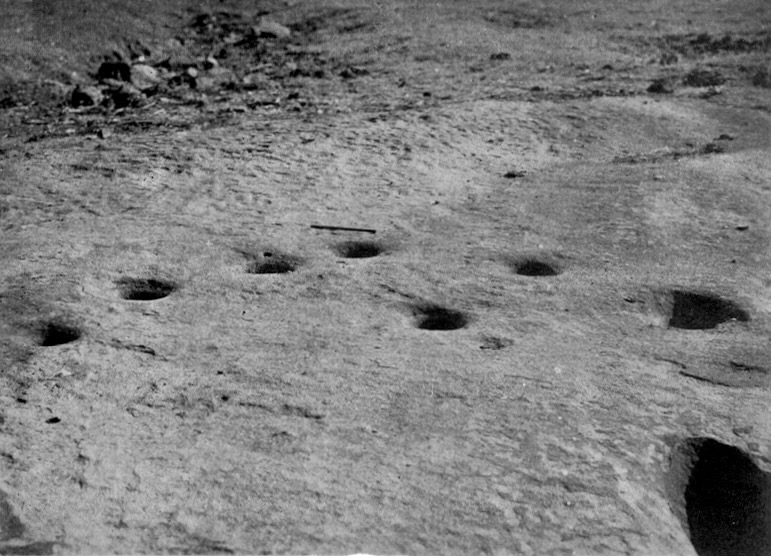
Bedrock motar holes near Santa Lucia Peak

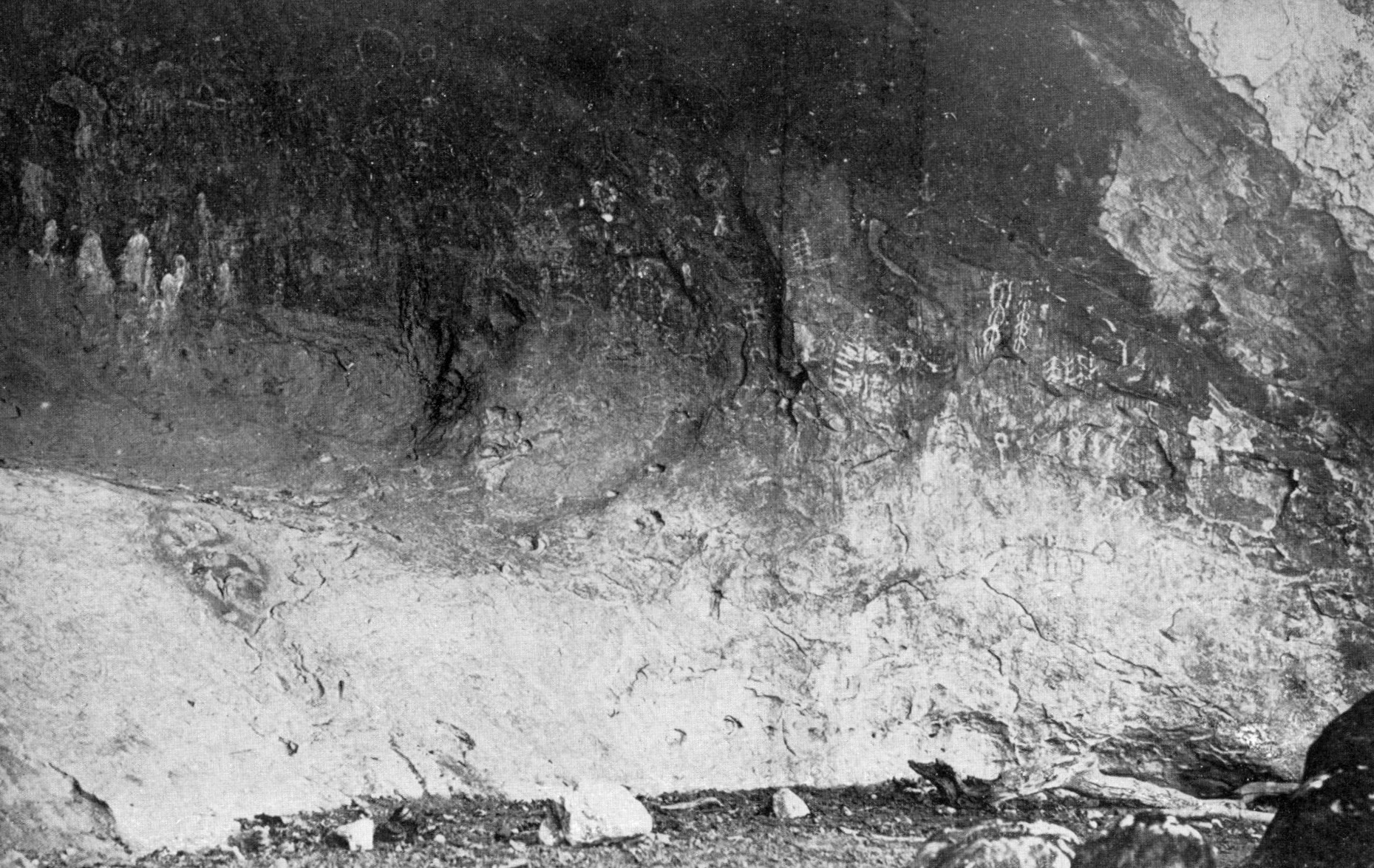
Pictographs in the Cueva Pintada Cave

Cueva Pintada is located southwest of King City, California, in southern Monterey County on the Fort Hunter Liggett reservation. The cave is situated to the north of the Mission San Antonio de Padua by about five miles, and east of the San Antonio River.

It is archaeological site CA-MNT-256.

Its cave walls have pictographs that originate from peoples who inhabited this region around 10,000 in the past. A U.S. Army report from 1975 states that some of the pictographs may have been created by more recent Indigenous peoples.

The Cueva Pintada site is Salinan in origin. It corresponds to the "Cave of the Idols," which was presented to the padres at Mission San Antonio de Padua shortly after its establishment and is referenced in Junípero Serra's letter dated May 21, 1773. The Salinan Native American tribe lived along the Salinas River, encompassing present-day Monterey County and San Luis Obispo counties.

According to the California State Military Museum, visits to the site are limited by the United States Army base at Fort Hunter Liggett. The entrance to the cave is at an elevation 3,000 ft (910 m). The Cueva Pintada site is protected by a chain-link fence and razor wire. The walls are covered with prehistoric white, red, black, and ochre pictographs. The rock overhangs and caves served as a rock shelter, standing approximately 16.5 ft (5.0 m) high and 21 ft (6.4 m) wide. The cave is at a width of 45 ft (14 m), with a depth between 15 ft (4.6 m) and 20 ft (6.1 m). The pictographs illustrate animals as well as geometric and linear patterns.

In 1980, Archaeological Consulting, led by Gary S. Breschini and Trudy Haversat, began on a project focused on documenting the pictographs found at the archaeological site CA-MNT-256 at Cueva Pintada, with the support from the State Historic Preservation Office. The archaeological exploration of the site resulted in the creation of over 360 drawings, tracings, and photographs capturing the pictographs. These records are currently housed at the Rock Art Archives at University of California, Los Angeles.

Cueva Pintada was registered on the National Register of Historic Places on February 13, 1975, for King City, Monterey County, California.

== See also ==
- National Register of Historic Places listings in Monterey County, California
- Wagon Caves
