= Krough House =

Historic house in California, United States

- U.S. National Register of Historic Places
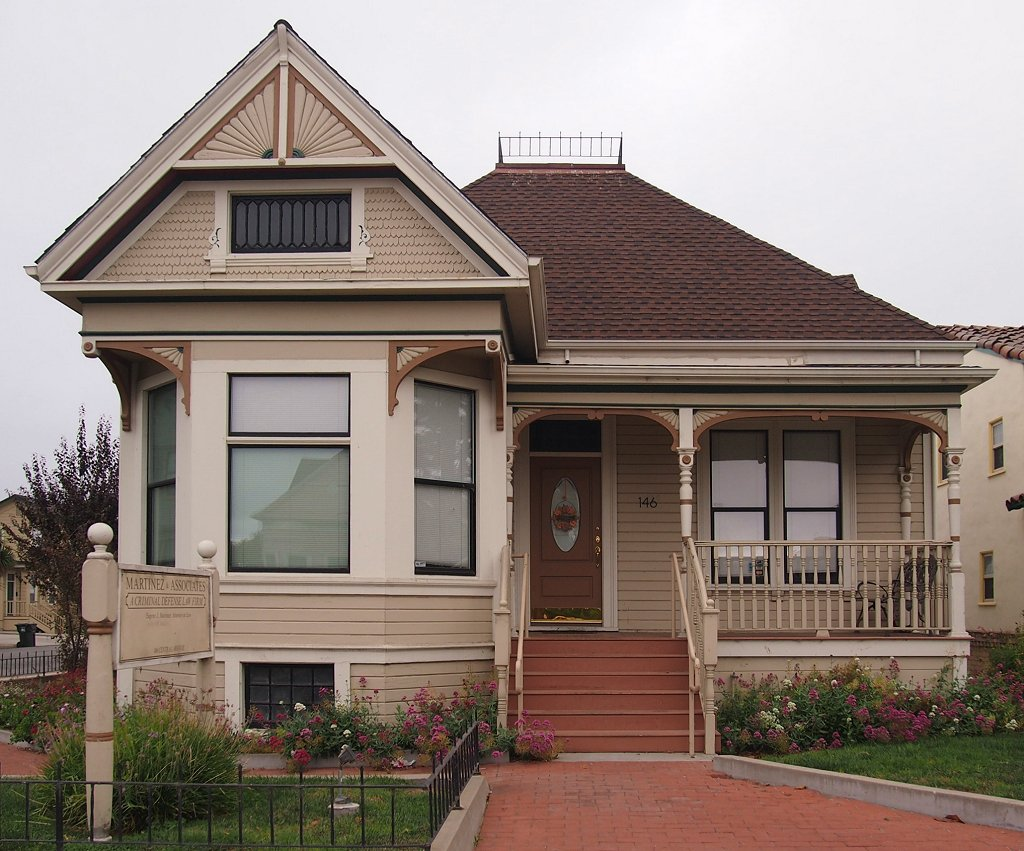
- Krough House 2013

- Location of Krough House in California
- Location: 146 Central Ave., Salinas, California
- Coordinates: 36°40′36″N 121°39′36″W
- Area: less than one acre
- Built: c. 1900
- Architectural style: Queen Anne
- Restored: 1979
- Restored by: Belli & Christensen
- NRHP reference No.: 82002209
- Added to NRHP: January 18, 1982

Krough House is a historic Queen Anne style house located at 146 Central Avenue, Salinas, California. It is one of four surviving examples of the Queen Anne houses that characterized Central Avenue in the 1890s. The house was listed on the National Register of Historic Places on January 18, 1982.

== History ==
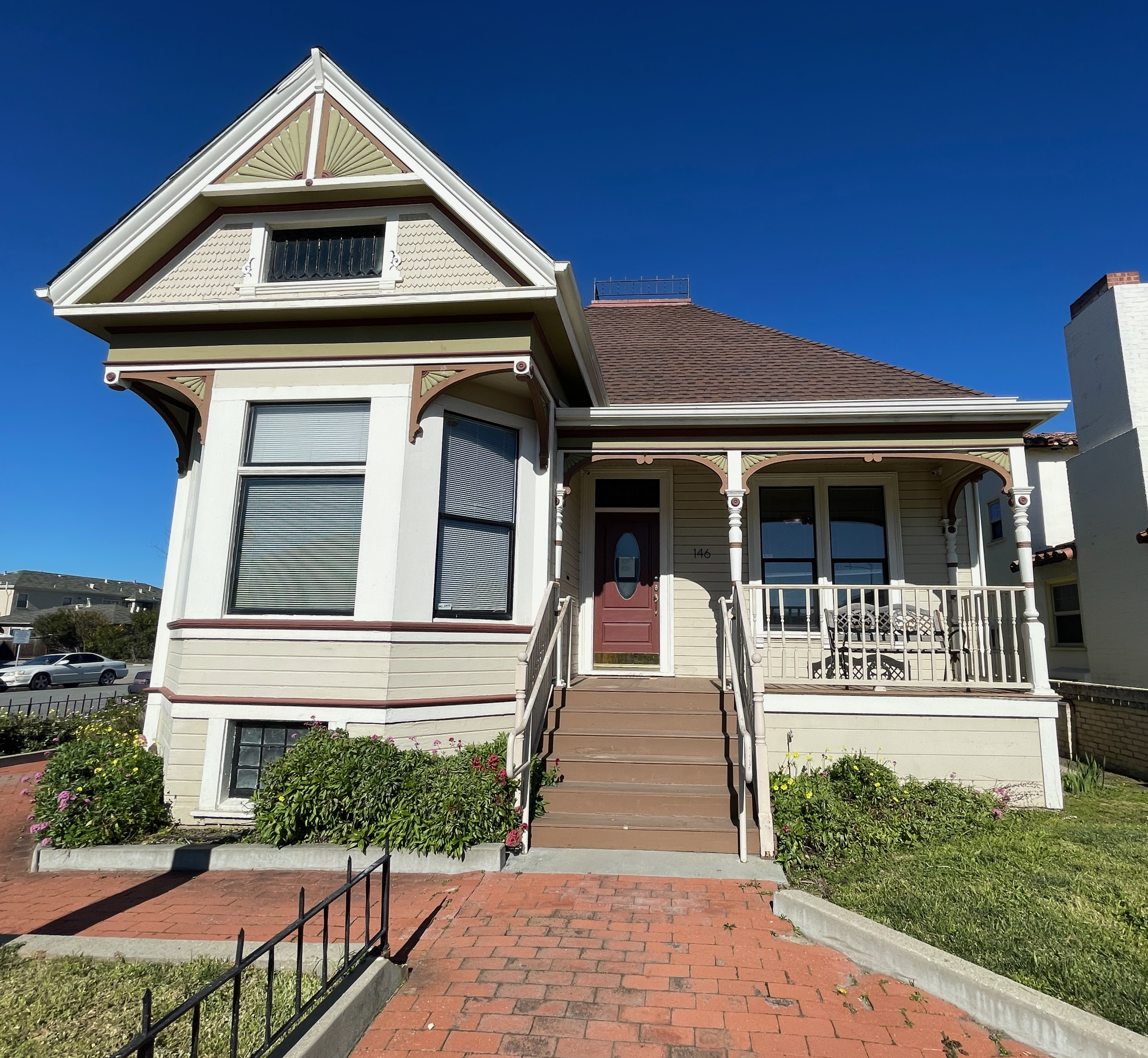
Krough House, 146 Central Ave. (2022)

The Krough House is a one-story, wood-frame, single-family residence built in a Queen Anne style. It has redwood siding with a pitch gable roof covered with composition shingles. A small window appears just above two bay windows located at the front of the house. A staircase leads to a redwood paneled front door and porch. The rear of the house has a sun porch and rear entrance. The house has a small cellar with an entrance outside. In the 1890s, Central Avenue was a street of many Queen Anne houses. Today, the Krough House is one of only four of the houses remaining.

The Krough House has had several owners; a major restoration of the house and landscaping took place in 1979.

The house is named for the Krough family who were immigrants from Slesvig, Germany who built the Krough House on 146 Central Avenue.

== See also ==
- National Register of Historic Places listings in Monterey County, California
