= José Mario Gil Adobe =

Historic site Jolon, California United States

- U.S. National Register of Historic Places
- Location within California
- Location: Hunter Liggett Military Reservation, Jolon, California
- Coordinates: 35°57′39″N 121°11′18″W
- Area: 1,200 square feet (110 m^{2})
- Built: 1865; 161 years ago
- Architectural style: Spanish architecture
- NRHP reference No.: 74000537
- Added to NRHP: June 7, 1974

José Mario Gil Adobe is a rancho adobe established in 1865 by Don José Maria Gil, a prosperous Monterey rancher of Spanish origin. The Adobe is located on Fort Hunter Liggett, near Jolon, in the southwestern part of Monterey County, California. The rancho adobe exemplifies the architecture style and cattle ranching economy prevalent in the Salinas Valley during the era of cattle ranching, which preceded the transition to vegetable farming dependent on irrigation. The site was officially listed on the National Register of Historic Places on June 7, 1974.

== History ==
=== Don José Maria Gil ===
Don José Maria Gil was born in Madrid, Spain, on December 14, 1821. His father was from Scotland and traveled to Spain where he met and married a Spanish woman. When José was seven years old, his family settled in Herongariquero, Mexico. At age 21, he moved to California. During the California gold rush, Jose was successful in the gold mines in the Santa Lucia Mountains but gave up this occupation and moved to Jolon, California. He worked as a farmhand at the Rancho Milpitas. On June 5, 1868, he became a naturalized U.S. citizen. On the ranch, Gil provided employment opportunities for the less fortunate, and played an important role in the establishment of California's school system.

=== The Adobe ===
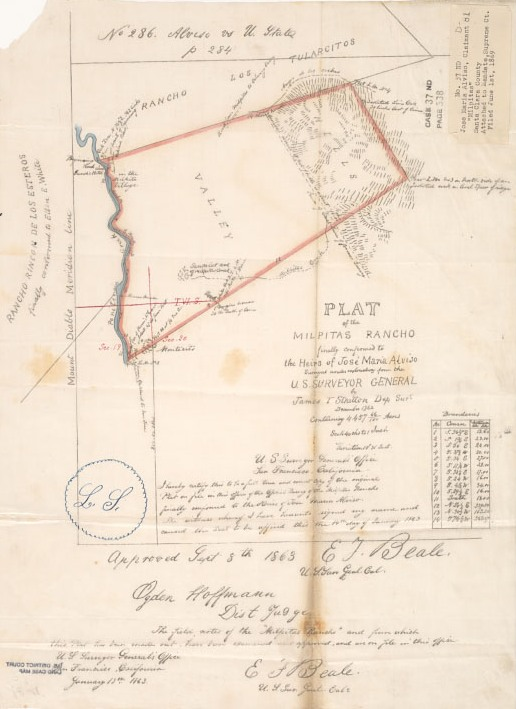
Map of the Rancho Milpitas

The Mexican land grant of the Mission San Antonio de Padua was subdivided into 10 parcels, one of which was known as the Rancho Milpitas land grant, encompassing an area of 4,458-acre (18.04 km^{2}). The Gil property constituted only a small portion of this land grant. Initially settling on the land as a squatter, Gil constructed an adobe building in 1865, that was used as a ranch house. In 1871, he formalized his ownership by purchasing 260 acres (110 ha), securing both his adobe house and the surrounding land that formed his ranch.

The adobe is approximately 1,200 square feet (110 m^{2}) in an “L” shape, a single-story building, located on Fort Hunter Liggett at the crossing of two country roads. It has a Spanish architecture style. Three-sided wooden porches encircle the structure, while the walls consist of adobe brick, having a thickness of 3 ft (0.91 m). Certain sections of the current flooring are made of wood, whereas the original flooring consisted of packed dirt. The structure has seven rooms and two indoor fireplaces.

José Mario Gil raised a family in the adobe. His first marriage, in 1850, to Juliana Gomez bore three sons. Following her death, she was buried beneath the belfry of the Mission San Antonio de Padua. After Juliana’s death, Jose married Maria Vallejo in 1860, and together they had nine sons and five daughters. Each child contributed to the history of the adobe. Adjacent to the Adobe, there is a family cemetery housing the remains of Jose Kario Gil, his second wife Maria, and numerous children.

When Gil died in 1891, he left his estate to his wife. After his wife's death in 1909, the family decided to sell the 212-acre plot of land. In 1910, advertisements in the local newspaper were used to announce the sale of the property, and it was sold to Dr. Pter K. Watters the same year. In 1917, Watters sold the property to Philip Miller. The Millers lived on the property until the late 1920s, when it was bought by William Randolph Hearst, who purchased all of the ranch lands in the area.

Throughout the early 1900s, the Gil Adobe was recognized for its landscaped grounds. Unfortunately, both the surroundings and the building itself experienced a period of neglect starting around 1930. In 1940, Hearst deeded the property to the U.S. Army, making them the legal owners of the Gil Adobe property. The army repurposed the adobe as an eight-person Officers' Quarters during the 1950s.

Since the early 1970s, the adobe has stood unoccupied. In 1979, the Army took measures to safeguard it from vandalism by boarding up its doors and windows. Following a building study conducted by the Allen and Sanchez firm in 1993, the Army implemented further protective measures, including the installation of a composition roof and a chain-link fence. Once again, the doors and windows were boarded up to preserve the interior of the adobe. In October 2023, the Engineer Research and Development Center published an extensive report on the José Mario Gil Adobe. Currently, the adobe is in a good preservation state and can be restored. However, the surrounding grounds are in a state of neglect. To restore the structure, it would be necessary to eliminate certain additions were made during the period when the U.S. Army used the Adobe as barracks in World War II.

The historical importance of the Gil Adobe lies in its status as one of the handful of adobes in Monterey County that hasn't been converted into a private residence. This makes it an important example of ranch adobes that once dotted the Salinas Valley. The Adobe functioned as a ranch house during the period when cattle ranching and dry farming formed the backbone of Monterey County agriculture. This period predates the transition to high-yield vegetable farming dependent on irrigation, which eventually replaced the traditional practices.

== See also ==
- National Register of Historic Places listings in Monterey County, California
