= Republic Cafe =

Historic house in California, United States

- Republic Café
- U.S. National Register of Historic Places
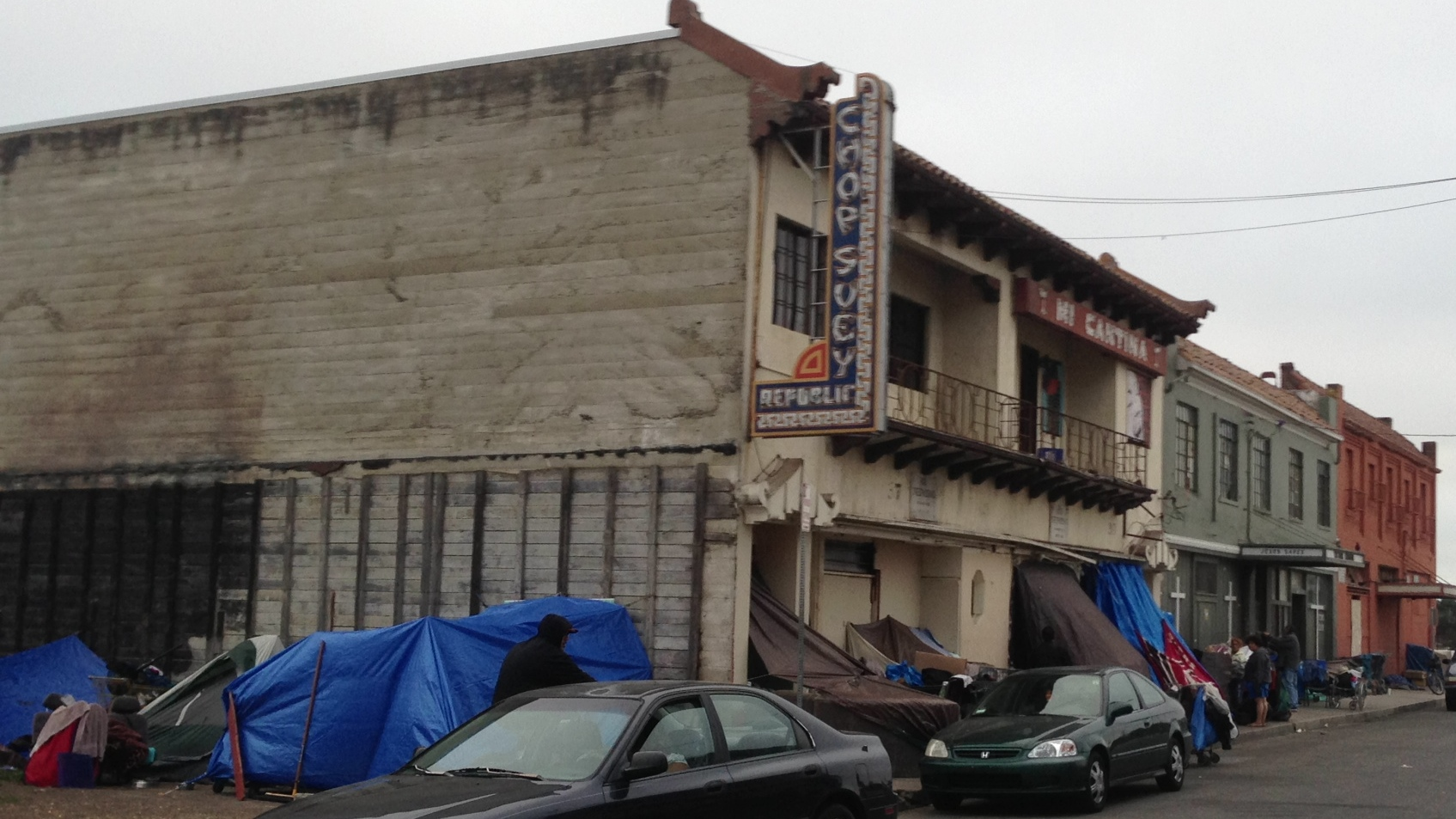
- Republic Café in 2013

- Location of Republic Café in California
- Location: 37 Soledad Street, Salinas, California
- Coordinates: 36°40′43″N 121°39′07″W
- Area: less than one acre
- Built: 1942
- Architectural style: Mission Revival architecture
- NRHP reference No.: 11000430
- Added to NRHP: July 14, 2011

The Republic Café was an Asian restaurant and banquet hall in Salinas, California's Chinatown, in the United States. It was one of Salinas's oldest surviving commercial buildings that was in operation from 1942 to 1988. Serving Chinese cuisine such as Peking duck, the Republic Café has been described as part of the neighborhood's Asian American history.

== History ==
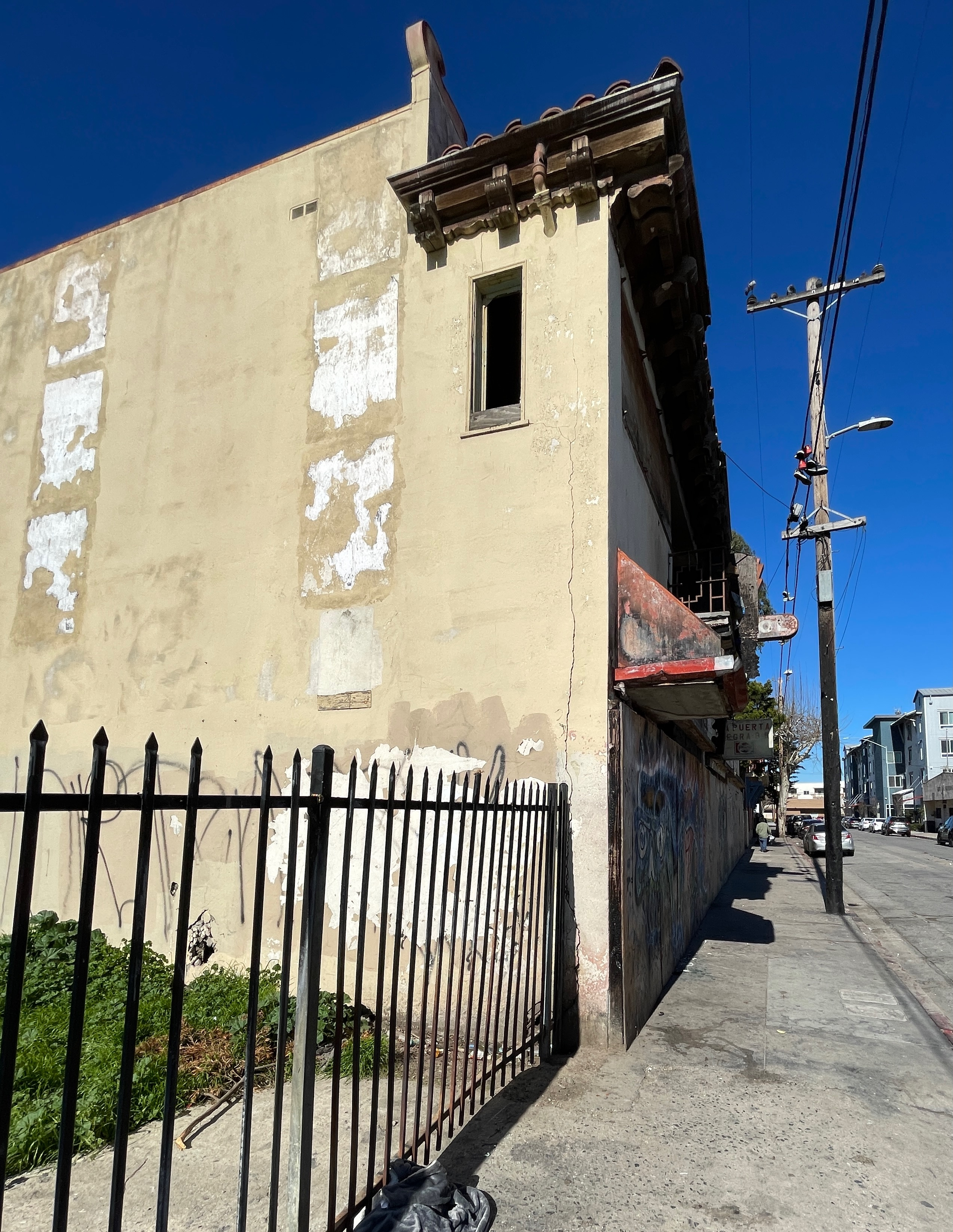
Republic Cafe in 2022

The Republic Café is a Mission Revival architecture style building located at 37 Soledad Street in Salinas, California. It was once an Asian restaurant and banquet hall that was in operation from 1942 to 1988, where the historic Salinas Chinatown used to be. The first Chinatown was established in 1872 and was destroyed by fire in 1893. Chinese merchants established a new Chinatown a few blocks east on Soledad Street. The Republic Café and Chinatown provided a gathering place for the Chinese, Japanese, and Filipino communities to celebrate their cultural heritage.

The Republic Café was built in 1942 by the Ahtye and Chin Bow families, as Chinatown peaked after the 1920s and 1930s. There was need for a restaurant that could have small and large gatherings for the Asian communities. It became the place to hold celebrations, weddings, and the Chinese New Year. The Café was owned by Salinas resident Wally Ahtye, who lived on the second floor of the property for many years.

The Republic Café is listed as significant between 1942 and 1956, under Criterion A, in Asian Ethnic Heritage. The building has kept its original narrow, rectangular layout, and facade with Chinese architectural elements, including the wood rafters and clay tiled roof. A neon sign reads "Chop Suey - Republic." The Café has a second-floor balcony with Chinese ironwork. The walls are reinforced concrete with finished stucco.

In the late 1950s and early 1960s, many of the buildings in Chinatown were demolished because they were declared unsafe by the federal urban renewal program. The Republic Café closed its doors in 1988 as one of the last businesses in the area.

There were plans for restoration of the Republic Café and the adjacent Lotus Inn, thanks to a three-year grant from the U.S. Department of Housing and Urban Development (HUD). The buildings were scheduled to open in the spring of 2012 as an Asian cultural center and museum, but these plans fell through.

In May 2021, there were still plans to open the Asian cultural center and museum. The Asian Culture Experience (ACE) group aimed to raise $200,000 to help build the center and museum to help preserve the history and cultures of Chinese, Japanese, and Filipino groups.

In October 2022, a fire broke out at the Republic Café. ACE estimated that the fire would set them back three to five years. The Café was left with holes in the ceiling, walls caving in, and water damage after the fire.

== See also ==
- National Register of Historic Places listings in Monterey County, California
