= Fort Ord Station Veterinary Hospital =

- U.S. National Register of Historic Places
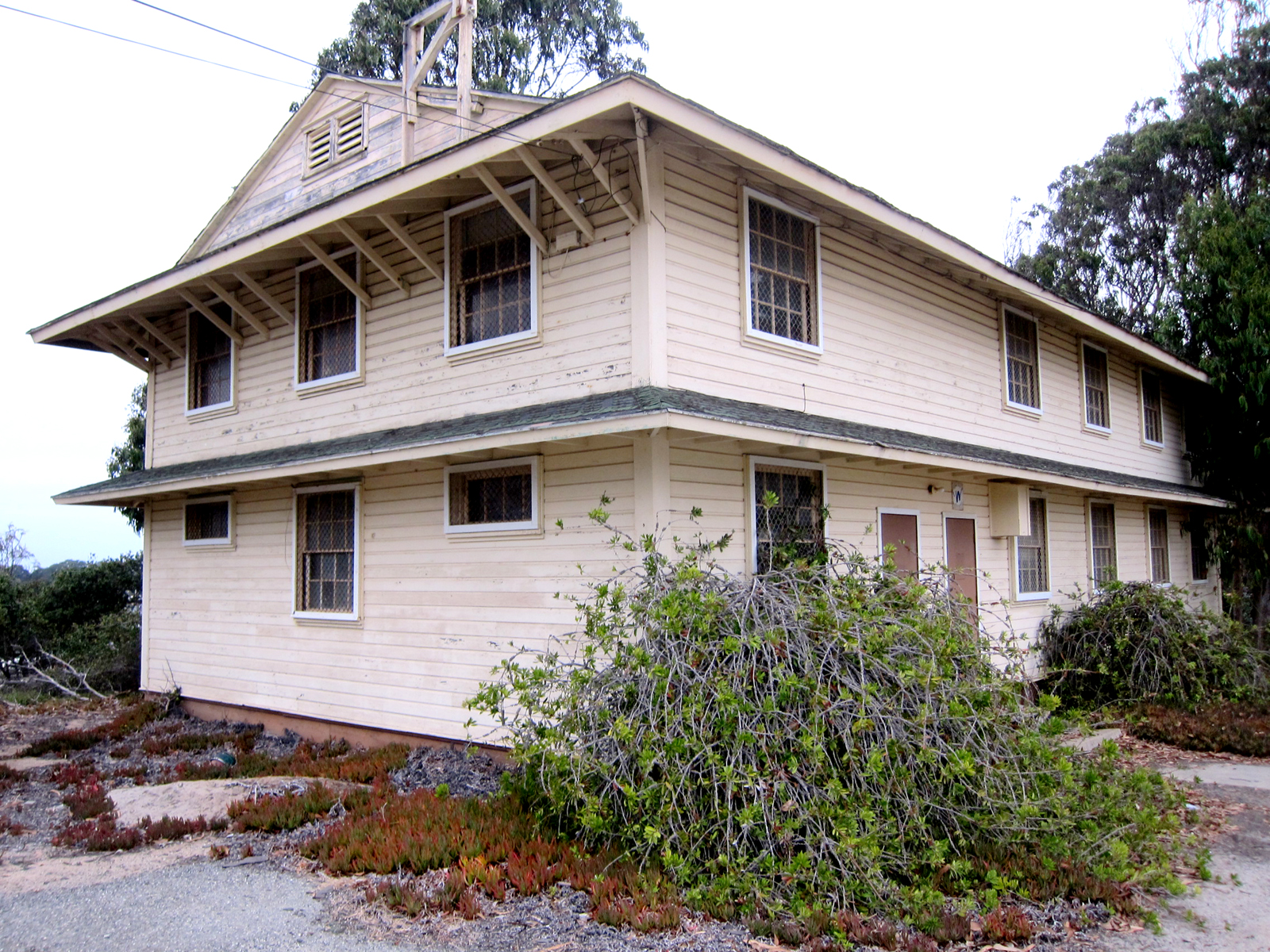
- Barracks at the Fort Ord Station Veterinary Hospital from the southeast

- Location within California Location within the United States
- Location: 2872 5th Avenue, Marina, California
- Coordinates: 36°39′45″N 121°47′57″W
- Area: 1.8 acres (0.73 ha)
- Built: 1941
- Architect: U.S. Army Corps of Engineers, U.S. Army Office of the Quartermaster General
- Architectural style: World War II Mobilization Series 700
- NRHP reference No.: 14000305
- Added to NRHP: June 17, 2014

Fort Ord Station Veterinary Hospital is a former equestrian veterinary complex at Fort Ord in Marina, California, United States. It was built in 1941 on the assumption that horses and mules would continue playing an important role in the United States Army for cavalry, field artillery, and supply packing units during World War II. The Station Veterinary Hospital (SVH) was converted to other purposes when mounted soldiers were discontinued in 1942. A 1.8-acre (0.73 ha) complex of 16 contributing properties was listed on the National Register of Historic Places in 2014 for having local significance in military history. The complex is of the nation's last constructed and last surviving equestrian veterinary hospitals of the U.S. Army, symbolizing the final years of horse-dependent warfare. Five of the buildings are now managed by the city of Marina as the Marina Equestrian Center, while the former barracks is vacant and owned by the Marina Coast Water District.

== See also ==
- National Register of Historic Places listings in Monterey County, California
