= Site Number 4 Mnt 85 =

Historic site in Greenfield, California United States

- U.S. National Register of Historic Places
- Location within California
- Location: Greenfield, California
- Coordinates: 36°20′37″N 121°12′42″W
- Built: Prehistoric
- NRHP reference No.: 76000502
- Added to NRHP: October 29, 1976

Site Number 4 Mnt 85 is the remains of a prehistoric village site in Greenfield, California, United States. The site has had four archaeological excavations in a rock shelter, situated on property owned by the United States Forest Service within the mid–Arroyo Seco region. The site was officially listed on the National Register of Historic Places on October 29, 1976.

== History ==
In 1979, Sally Ann Dean reported on the physical and chemical analysis of sediments found at prehistoric site number 4 Mnt-85 in Greenfield, California.

CA-MNT-85 has had four archaeological excavations in a rock shelter, located on property owned by the United States Forest Service within the mid–Arroyo Seco Valley area. The initial excavation took place around 1929, led by W. W. Hill and a team of researchers from the University of California, Berkeley. In 1957, Gary Vescelius, a UC Berkeley student, carried out the second excavation, uncovering both perishable and nonperishable items. The artifacts from these two excavations are currently housed at the Phoebe Hearst Museum at the University of California. Between 1974 and 1976, Benjamin Ananian led the third excavation. Although the materials from this dig were initially stored at California State University, Hayward, they appear to have been misplaced. Despite the absence of an archaeological report, a comprehensive soils analysis for the site is accessible. After the 1974 excavations, this site received a nomination for inclusion in the National Register of Historic Places and has since been listed. The midden and rock paintings played roles as contributing elements to the nomination. In May 1999, an excavation at this site was undertaken by the U.S. Forest Service, and the findings of their research have been outlined in a preliminary report (Flenniken and Trautman 2001). Recent acquisition of fiber, cordage materials, wood, flaked stone, shell beads, and feather artifacts from CA-MNT-85 has occurred, originating from a collection amassed by a pot-hunter.

Fragments of basketry have been discovered at the archaeological site CA-MNT-85, situated in the Arroyo Seco drainage. Some of these fragments were unearthed during the Hill excavation in the late 1920s and were detailed by anthropologist Arnold Pilling. During the spring of 2003, Joan Brandoff-Kerr, the forest archaeologist for the Los Padres National Forest, said that supplementary fiber, cordage materials, and various artifacts from CA-MNT-85 had been donated to the Forest Service.

== See also ==
- National Register of Historic Places listings in Monterey County, California
- Timeline of North American prehistory
