= Peter J. Bontadelli House =

Historic house in California, United States

- U.S. National Register of Historic Places
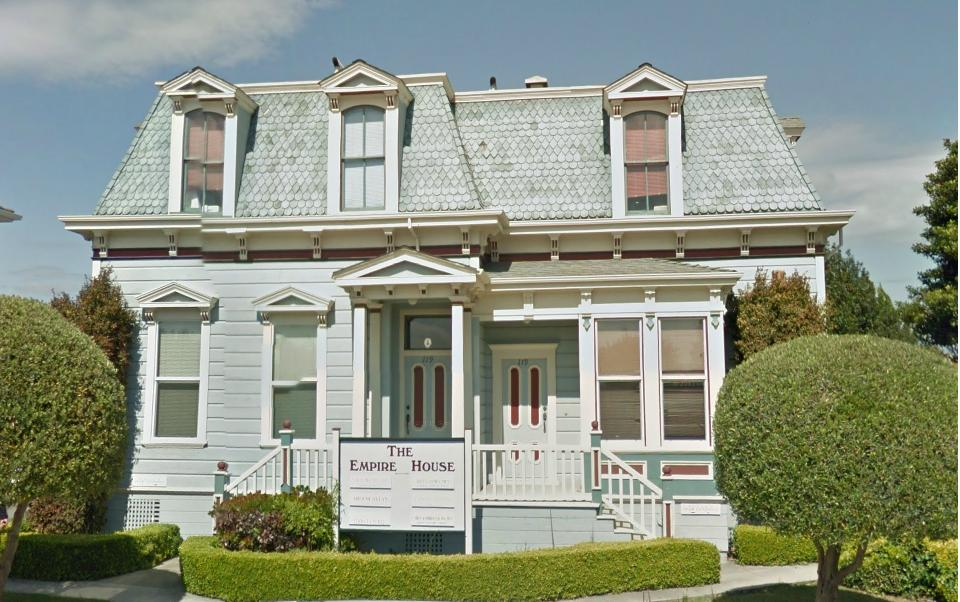
- Photo in 2012

- Location within California Location within the United States
- Location: 119 Cayuga St., Salinas, California
- Coordinates: 36°40′37″N 121°46′13″W
- Area: 0.4 acres (0.16 ha)
- Built: 1907
- Built by: Bontadelli, Peter J.
- Architectural style: Second Empire
- NRHP reference No.: 80000823
- Added to NRHP: July 15, 1980

The Peter J. Bontadelli House, at 119 Cayuga St. in Salinas, California, is a historic house that was built in 1907. Listed on the National Register of Historic Places in 1979, it was then the unique example of Second Empire architecture in all of Monterey County, California. It was built by Peter J. Bontadelli (1850-1935), an immigrant from Switzerland who had experience in Paris as a painting contractor. Bontadelli became a leader of the Swiss-American community in the area, including co-founding and serving as first president of the Swiss-American Rifle Club which opened in 1900 and is still operating in 2013 (now as the Monterey County Swiss Rifle Club). The house is of very high architectural quality.
