= El Castillo de Monterey =

Historic site of a Spanish fort in California, United States

- U.S. National Register of Historic Places
- El Castillo
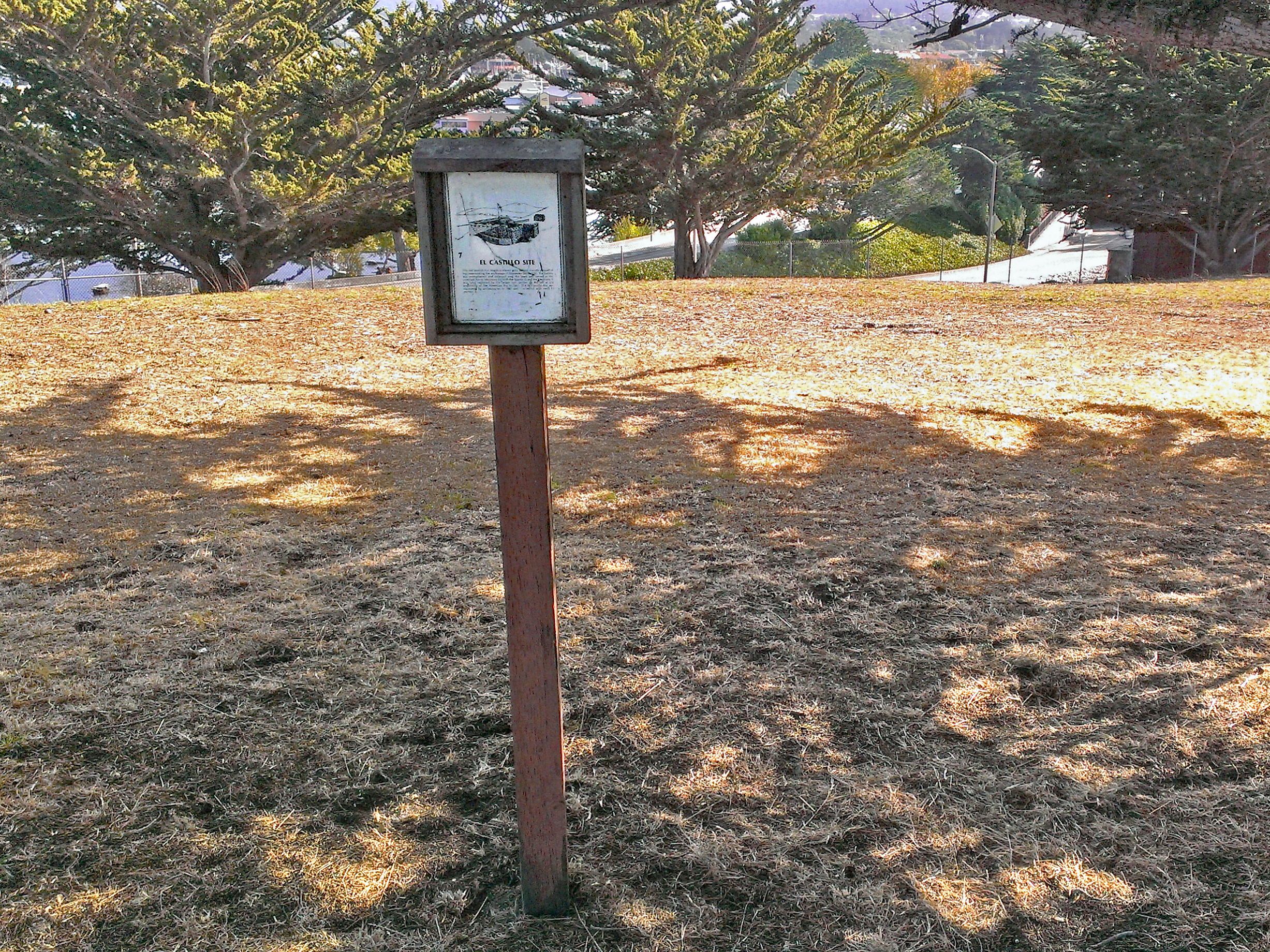
- El Castillo site

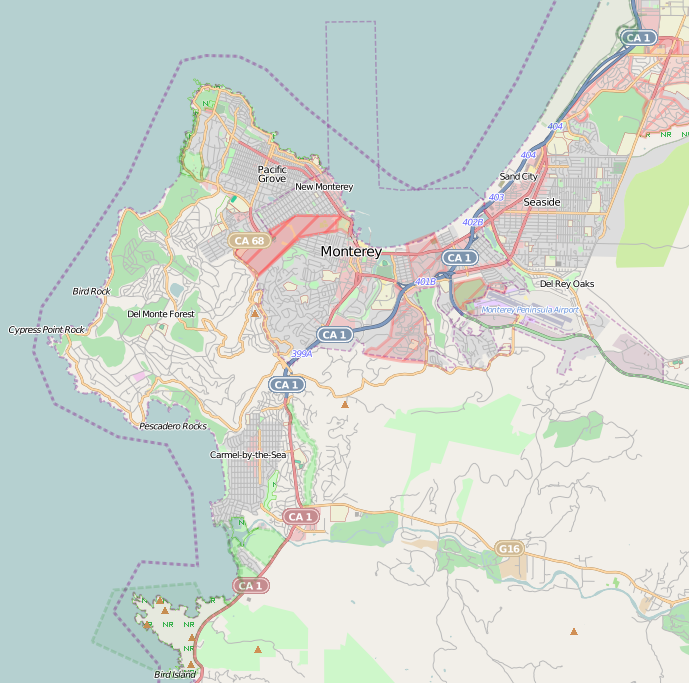
- Location within Monterey Peninsula Location within California
- Location: Monterey, California
- Coordinates: 36°36′22″N 121°53′43″W
- Built: 1792; 234 years ago
- NRHP reference No.: 71000167
- Added to NRHP: November 23, 1971

El Castillo de Monterey (Spanish for "The Castle of Monterey") was a fortification in Monterey, California, founded in 1792 by the Spanish Empire. The fort was constructed to protect the Monterey port and the Presidio of Monterey from invaders. The site was officially listed on the National Register of Historic Places on November 23, 1971.

== History ==
=== Spanish period (1770–1821) ===
Recognizing the significance of Monterey Bay, the Spanish sought to establish a firm presence in Alta California. The fort, initiated in 1792, started as a rudimentary log parapet with seven mounted and four unmounted cannons positioned behind it, aiming to safeguard the nearby Presidio of Monterey. Positioned on present-day Presidio Hill, the site sits on a level plain at an elevation of 60 ft (18 m), with views of the Monterey Harbor.

By 1796, enhancements were made to the Castillo, strengthening it with the addition of a new 60 ft (18 m) earthen V-shape embankment, 4 ft (1.2 m) high, on the side facing the Monterey Bay. The upgrades comprised a wooden gun platform supported by adobe bricks, casemates, and a barracks for the artillerymen. Despite these improvements, the Castillo did not attain sufficient fortification, and people visiting the area commonly criticized its capabilities.

The initial trial for the Castillo occurred on November 20, 1818, when two Argentine pirate ships, led by Commander Hippolyte Bouchard, launched an assault on Monterey. The pirates were unsuccessful in a frontal assault on the town and opted to disembark a command on Point Pinos. From there, they initiated their first attack on the Castillo, overpowering the defenders. Subsequently, they redirected the cannons towards the town, launching an assault that overwhelmed the defenders, prompting them to flee. The pirates went on to ransack the town, demolishing the Castillo's cannons and buildings. Before departing, they set the town on fire.

=== Mexican period (1822–1846) ===
Mexico gained independence from Spain in 1821. On November 3, 1836, Jose Castro, alongside a coalition of disgruntled ranchers, Indigenous people, and Americans, successfully captured the Castillo. The cannons were once again directed towards the town, compelling Governor Nicolás Gutiérrez to surrender after a single cannon shot.

On October 19, 1842, Commodore Thomas Catesby Jones of the United States Navy erroneously thought that the United States and Mexico were at war, leading him to take control of the fort on October 20, 1842. After realizing his mistake, Jones offered an apology and reinstated Mexican rule.

=== American period (1846–present) ===
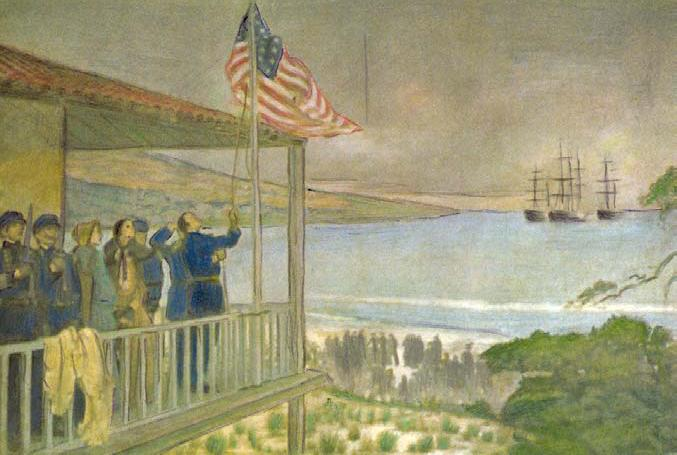
Batalla de Monterey

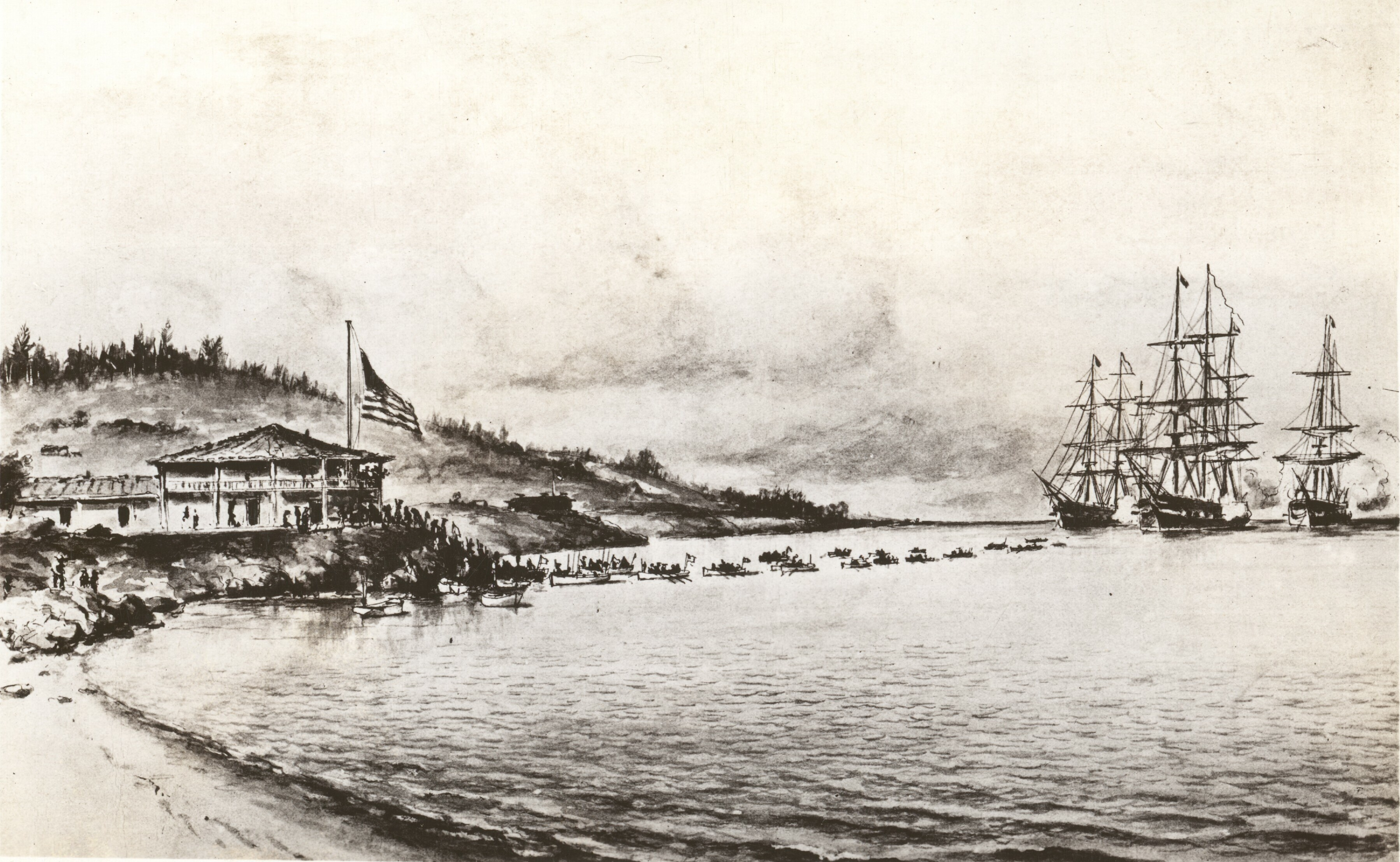
The U.S. Capture of Monterey by Commodore Sloat

The U.S. Congress proclaimed the Mexican–American War on May 11, 1846, following a Mexican assault on U.S. forces in Texas. This declaration paved the way for the American occupation of California. The commencement of the American period occurred in Monterey, marked by the entry of U.S. naval ships into Monterey Bay. While in command of the Savannah, Navy Captain William Mervine led a detachment of sailors and United States Marines against Monterey, California.

Early on July 7, 1846, the frigate USS Savannah and the two sloops, USS Cyane and USS Levant of the United States Navy, commanded by Commodore John D. Sloat, engaged in a skirmish called the Battle of Monterey. Sloat raised the American flag atop the Customs House at Monterey, and issued a proclamation announcing that California was now part of the United States.

Recognizing the susceptibility of old El Castillo site to land attacks from the raised ground behind it, the U.S. troops opted not to utilize it for their gun batteries. Instead, they built the initial U.S. fortification, Fort Mervine, on Presidio Hill behind the old Castillo. Little was left of El Castillo by 1880. In 1967, via National Park Service, a team of archaeologists, led by William E. Pritchard, was employed by the Central California Archaeological Foundation to conduct the excavation. the archeological excavations found stone foundations, two gun platforms, several stone storerooms and an adobe wall.

In 1934, the site was declared a California Historical Landmark. In 1970, it was included on the National Register of Historic Places. A historical marker reads: "Site of Spanish fort constructed in 1792 to protect the port and presidio of Monterey from inverse. This is one of only three forts constructed by the Spanish in California."

== See also ==
- Battles of the Mexican–American War
- Mexican-American War
