= Samuel T. Merritt House =

Historic house in Wisconsin, United States

- U.S. National Register of Historic Places
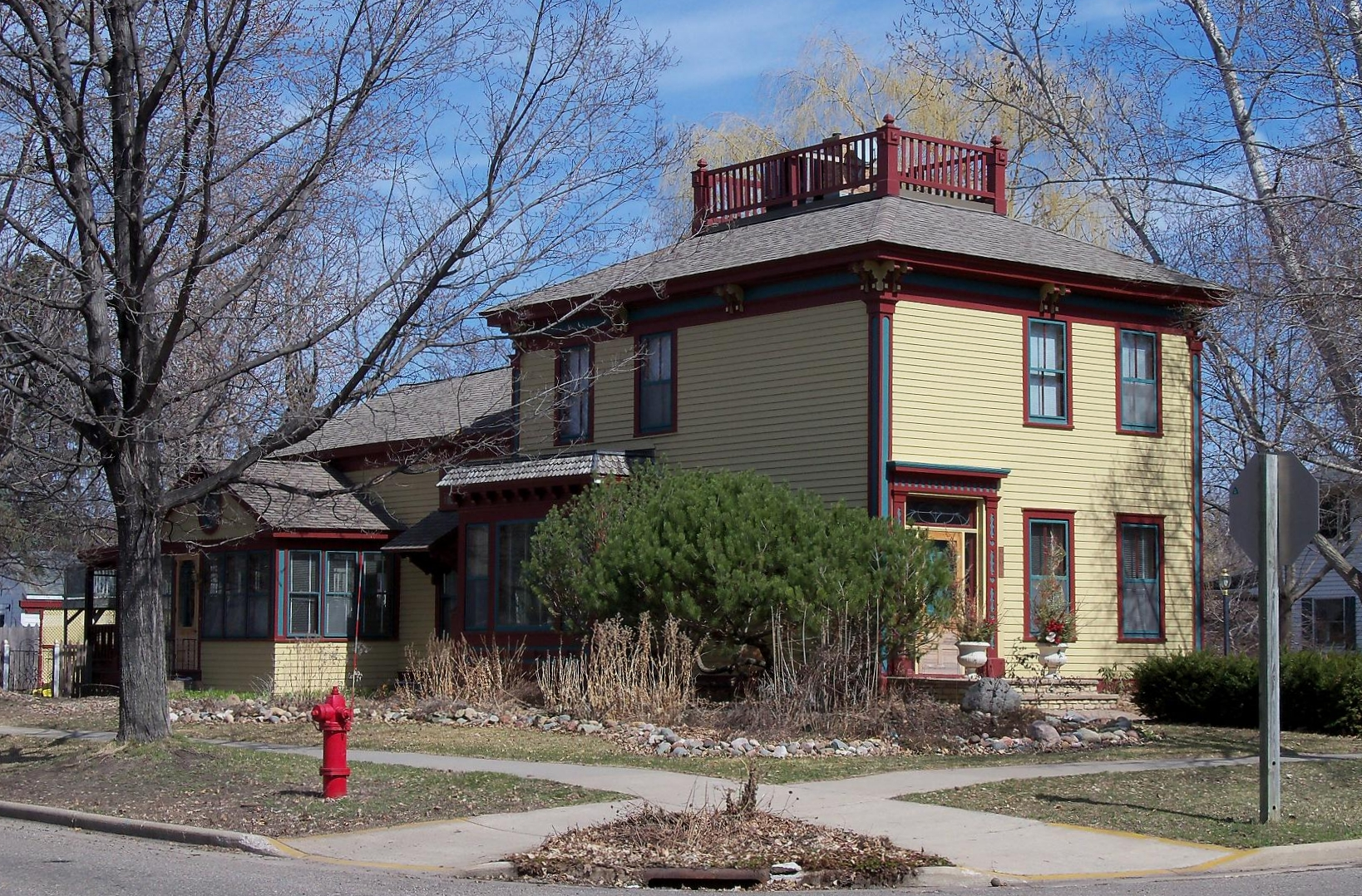

- Location within Wisconsin Location within the United States
- Location: 904 7th St. Hudson, Wisconsin
- Coordinates: 44°58′45″N 92°44′56″W
- Area: less than one acre
- Built: 1862
- Architectural style: Italianate
- MPS: Hudson and North Hudson MRA
- NRHP reference No.: 84000066
- Added to NRHP: October 4, 1984

The Samuel T. Merritt House is located in Hudson, Wisconsin, United States. It was added to the National Register of Historic Places in 1984.

It is a two-story Italianate house upon a stone foundation which was bought by Samuel T. Merritt in 1862. Merritt was a teacher, who moved from New York State to here.

Merritt became wealthy through business ventures including by being "the first to ship wheat down the (St. Croix) river to La Crosse, ...by barge, with a boat 'Viola', which was built in Hudson". Merritt was "A devout Baptist and Republican, ....recognized as a highly prominent and influential citizen, revered as 'starting out in life poor in pocket, but rich in the possession of health, courage, and ability. His success has not come...by any royal road, but through careful plodding work, good investments, and excellent management, while the ...esteem in which he has held has been honestly won by honorable methods and a pleasing personality.'"

After he purchased the house in 1862, he lived in it from 1867 to his death in 1918.
