= Trimmer Hill =

Historic house in California, United States

- U.S. National Register of Historic Places
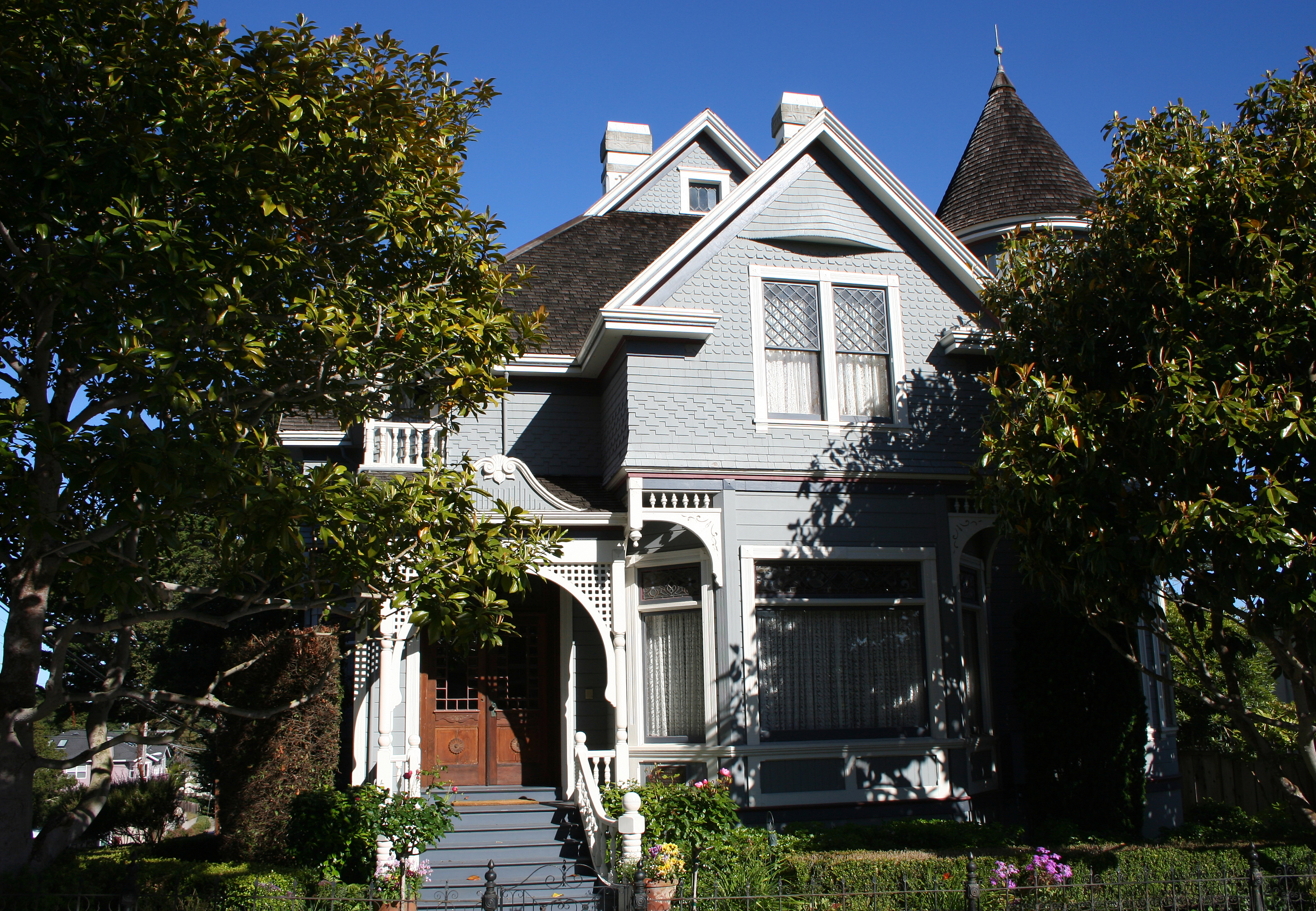

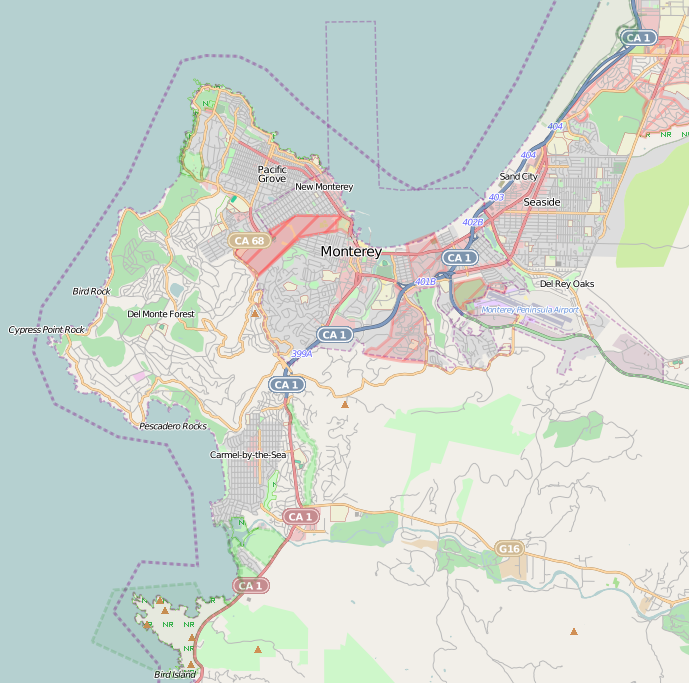
- Location within Monterey Peninsula Location within California Location within the United States
- Location: 230 6th St., Pacific Grove, California
- Coordinates: 36°37′4″N 121°54′36″W
- Area: 0.2 acres (0.081 ha)
- Built: 1893
- Architectural style: Queen Anne
- NRHP reference No.: 82002208
- Added to NRHP: June 28, 1982

Trimmer Hill is a historic Queen Anne style house at 230 6th St. in Pacific Grove, California, United States. It was built in 1893 and is listed on the National Register of Historic Places (NRHP).

It was built for Oliver Smith Trimmer, the first mayor of Pacific Grove, and mayor for 20 years. It was listed on the NRHP in 1982.

Its 1980 NRHP nomination asserts it is "an unaltered, exuberant example of period Queen Anne styling....one of the most outstanding examples of its type and period in a community which is known for its 19th century architecture". The house was also described as "a very good example of the Queen Anne style" in A Guide to Architecture in San Francisco and Northern California.
