= Lou Ellen Parmelee House =

Historic house in California, United States

- U.S. National Register of Historic Places
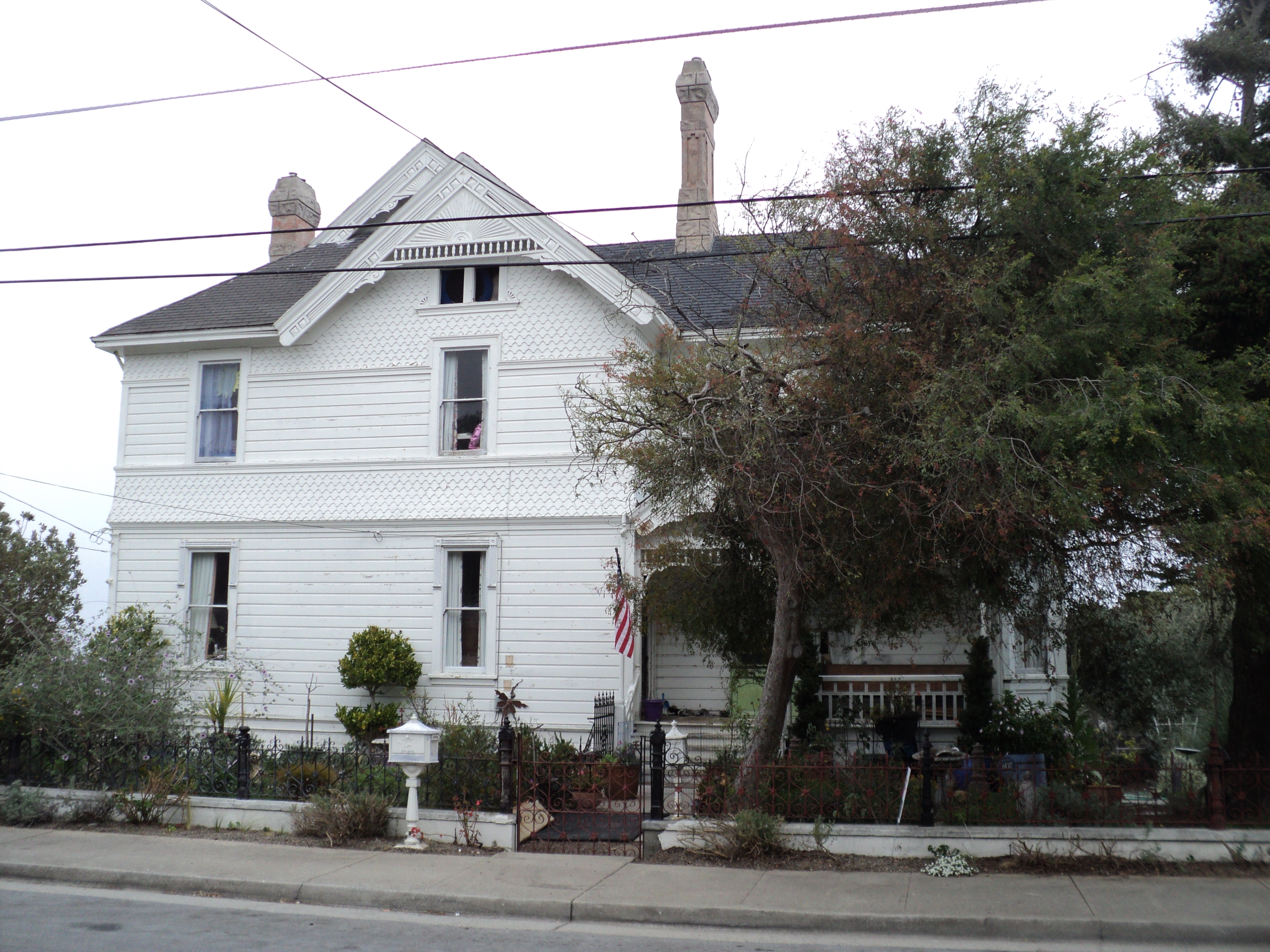
- House in 2012

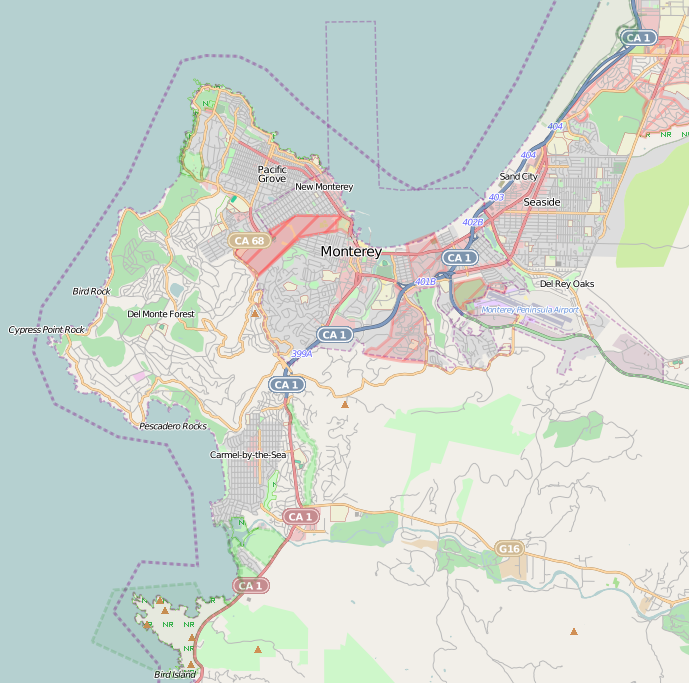
- Location within Monterey Peninsula Location within California Location within the United States
- Location: 570 Archer St., Monterey, California
- Coordinates: 36°36′40″N 121°54′15″W
- Area: less than one acre
- Built: 1896
- Architectural style: Queen Anne
- NRHP reference No.: 97001633
- Added to NRHP: January 7, 1998

The Lou Ellen Parmelee House is a historic Queen Anne style house located at 570 Archer St. in Monterey, California.

It was listed on the National Register of Historic Places in 1998. The house was deemed significant "as the best remaining example of Late Victorian Queen Anne high style residential design in Monterey", and also for the craftsmanship of its interior and exterior finishes, artistically. Built in 1896, it is well-preserved, with a 1946 extension removed in 2006.
