= Castroville Japanese Language School =

- U.S. National Register of Historic Places
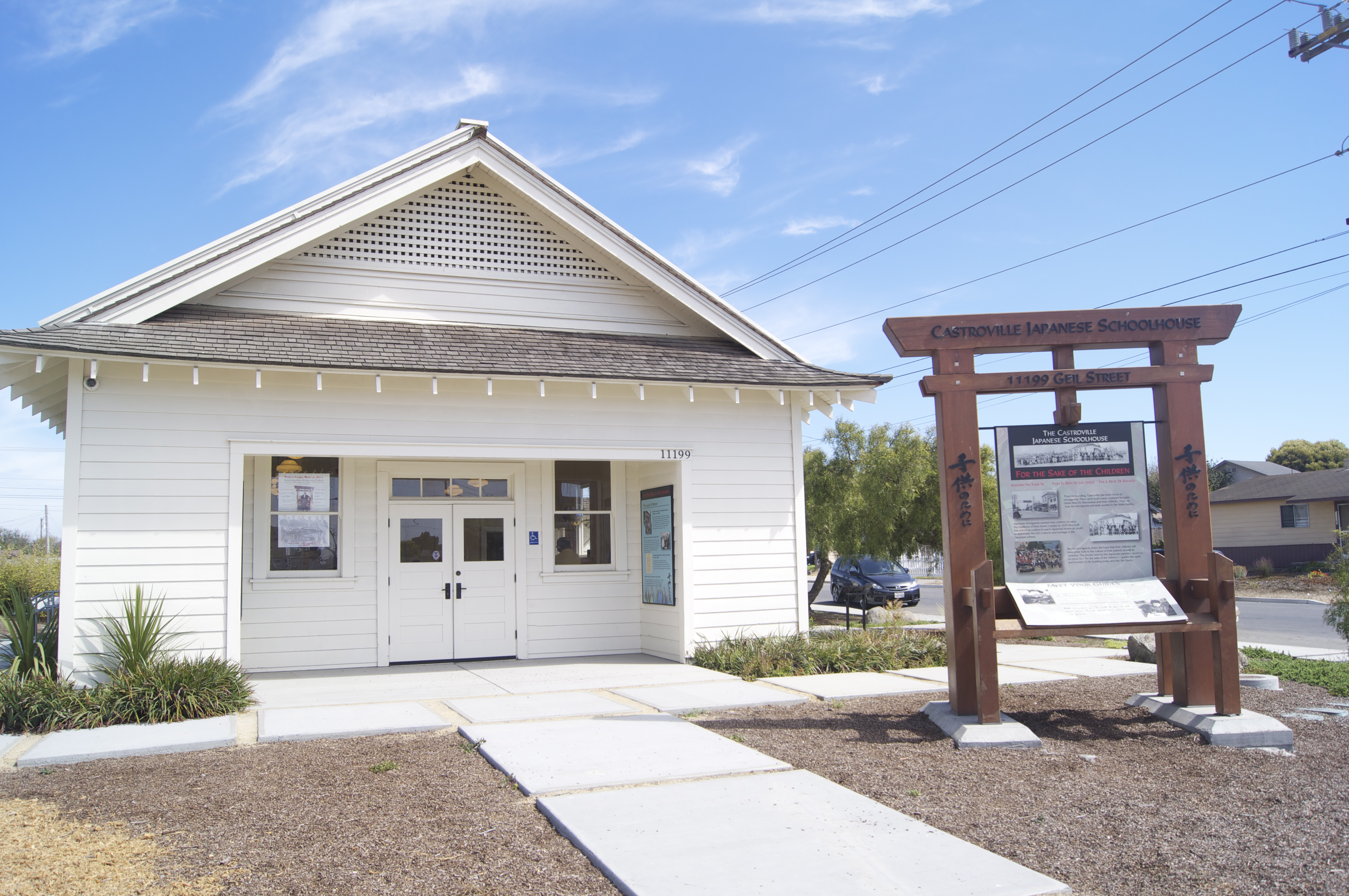
- Photo in 2012

- Location within California Location within the United States
- Location: 11199 Geil St., Castroville, California
- Coordinates: 36°45′54″N 121°45′05″W
- Area: less than one acre
- Built: 1936
- Built by: Kiezo Motokane and Kobayashi
- Architectural style: Hip Temple Roof
- NRHP reference No.: 95001127
- Added to NRHP: October 10, 1995

The Castroville Japanese Language School, also known as the Castroville Nihon Gakko, is a historic building located at 11199 Geil St. in Castroville, California that is listed on the National Register of Historic Places (NRHP).

== History ==
It was built in 1936 and served Japanese-American sharecropping farmer families of the area as a school, as a Buddhist temple, and as a community meeting hall.

It was closed just six years later, in 1942, when the Japanese-Americans of the area were interned for the duration of World War II. According to Kunio A. Sumida, who nominated it for NRHP listing, the building "represents and symbolizes the denial of the constitutional rights guaranteed under the United States Constitution."

== Description ==
The building is extremely simple and unremarkable, except perhaps for its hipped roof that may reflect Japanese temple architecture, so its importance is for its association with the Japanese-American community and what it represents to some. At the time of its NRHP nomination in 1995, it was somewhat weathered, but otherwise unchanged from its state in 1942. In a 2012 photo, it is apparent that the exterior of the building has been restored, and there is an interpretative display in front of the building.
