= G. T. Marsh and Sons =

- Marsh, G.T., and Sons
- U.S. National Register of Historic Places
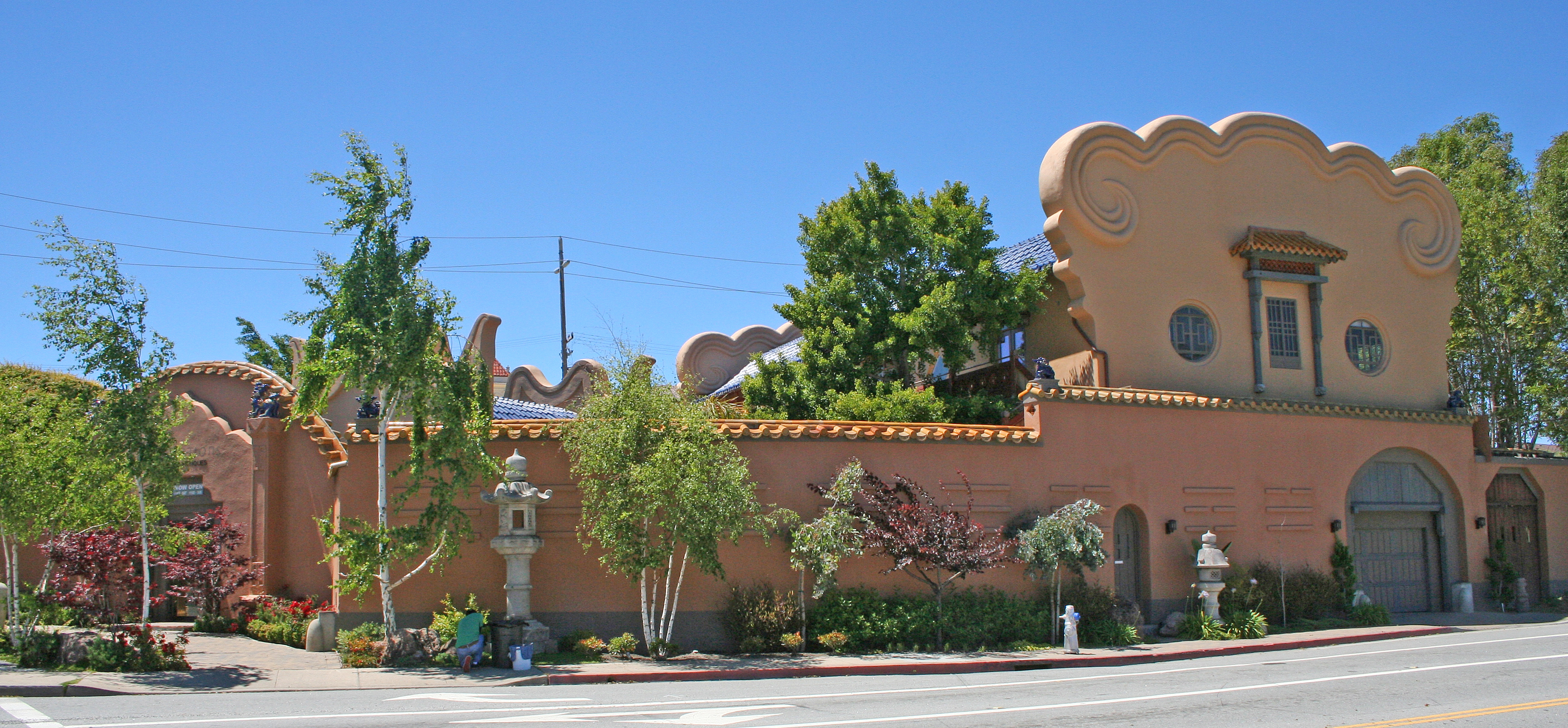
- G. T. Marsh and Sons from the southeast

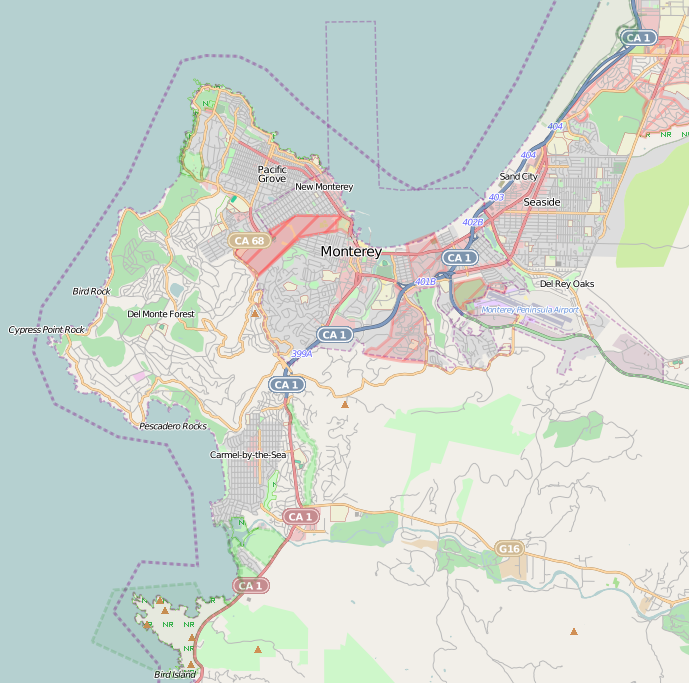
- Location within Monterey Peninsula Location within California Location within the United States
- Location: 599 Fremont St., Monterey, California
- Coordinates: 36°35′43″N 121°53′22″W
- Area: less than one acre
- Built: 1928
- Built by: Jenkins, Orrin; Japanese craftsmen
- Architectural style: Northern Chinese Residential
- NRHP reference No.: 05001113
- Added to NRHP: August 8, 2007

G.T. Marsh and Sons, also known as Marsh's Oriental Art Store, is a historic building in Monterey, California that is listed on the National Register of Historic Places. It was listed on the National Register in 2007; the listing included one contributing building and one other contributing structure.

It was built in 1928 by Japanese craftsmen and includes Sichuan Chinese architecture. According to its NRHP nomination, it is a "large, mysterious, architecturally outstanding, building" that is significant for representing "a highly artistic and specialized style that is unique to Monterey and possibly to the nation, and [which] has become one of the symbols of the City's important and colorful past."
