= Odd Fellows Hall (Gonzales, California) =

- Gabilan Lodge No. 372--Independent Order of Odd Fellows
- U.S. National Register of Historic Places
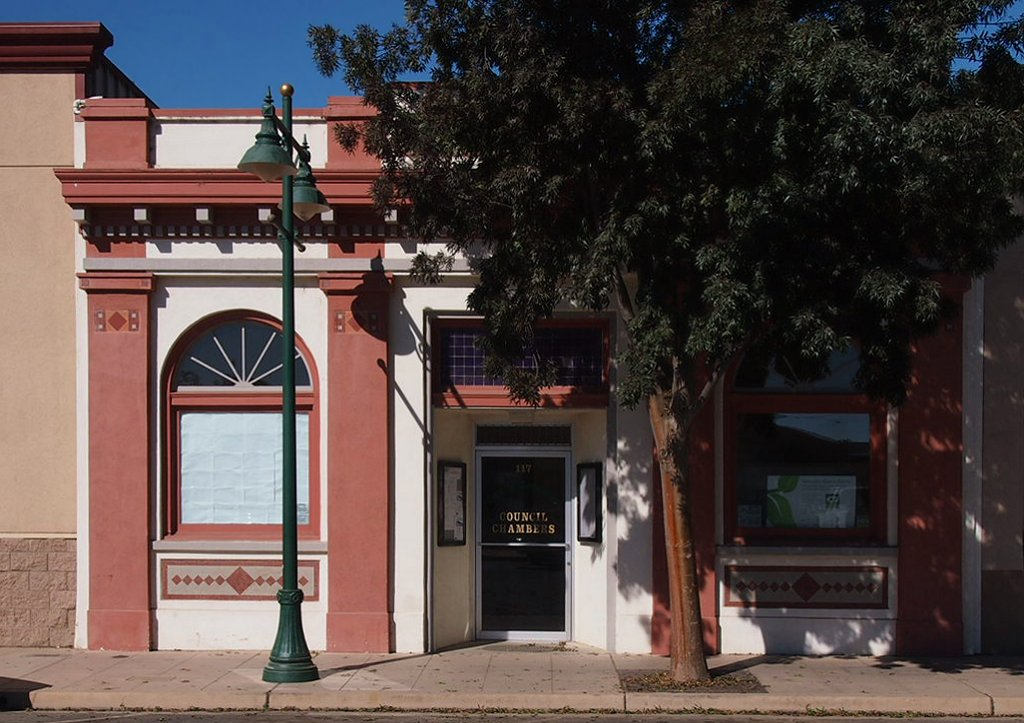
- The former Odd Fellows Hall from the south-southeast

- Location within California Location within the United States
- Location: 117 Fourth St., Gonzales, California
- Coordinates: 36°30′28″N 121°26′33″W
- Area: less than one acre
- Built: 1914
- Architect: Douglas, H.B.
- Architectural style: Classical Revival
- NRHP reference No.: 86002813
- Added to NRHP: October 02, 1986

The Gabilan Lodge No. 372-Independent Order of Odd Fellows, also known as Odd Fellows Lodge, is a building built in 1914 in Gonzales, California, United States. It was designed in Classical Revival style and served historically as a clubhouse. It was listed on the National Register of Historic Places in 1986. It currently serves as chambers for the Gonzalez City Council.
