= Josiah Merritt Adobe =

Historic house in California, United States

- U.S. National Register of Historic Places
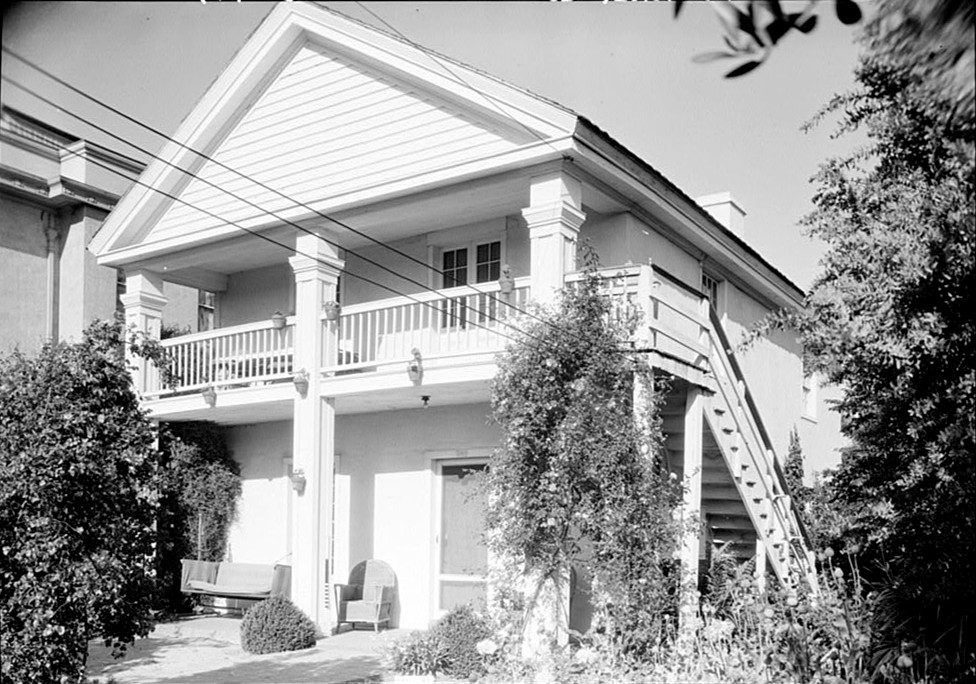

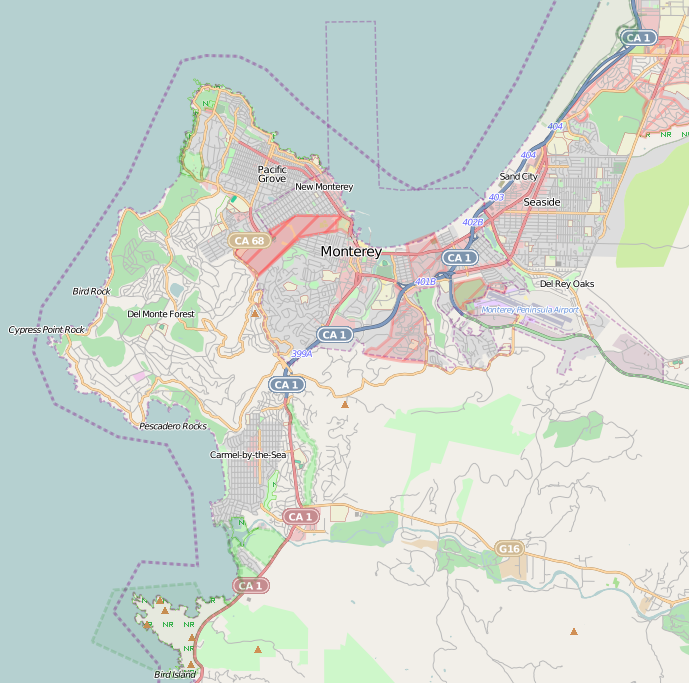
- Location within Monterey Peninsula Location within California Location within the United States
- Location: 386 Pacific St., Monterey, California
- Coordinates: 36°36′2″N 121°53′45″W
- Area: 1 acre (0.40 ha)
- Built: 1852
- Architectural style: Mixed (more Than 2 Styles From Different Periods)
- NRHP reference No.: 77000311
- Added to NRHP: November 22, 1977

The Josiah Merritt Adobe, located at 386 Pacific St. in Monterey, California and also known as Merritt House, is a historic house that is listed on the National Register of Historic Places.

It was built in 1830 and is architecturally significant as perhaps the only example of Greek Revival temple form architecture applied to an adobe building in Mexican California. The Benicia State Capitol Building (California State Landmark #153) included the Greek temple format but is made of stone or masonry. The building was documented by the Historic American Buildings Survey in 1936.

It was listed on the National Register of Historic Places in 1977. In 1979 the house was developed into a small hotel.
