= Centrella Inn =

- U.S. National Register of Historic Places
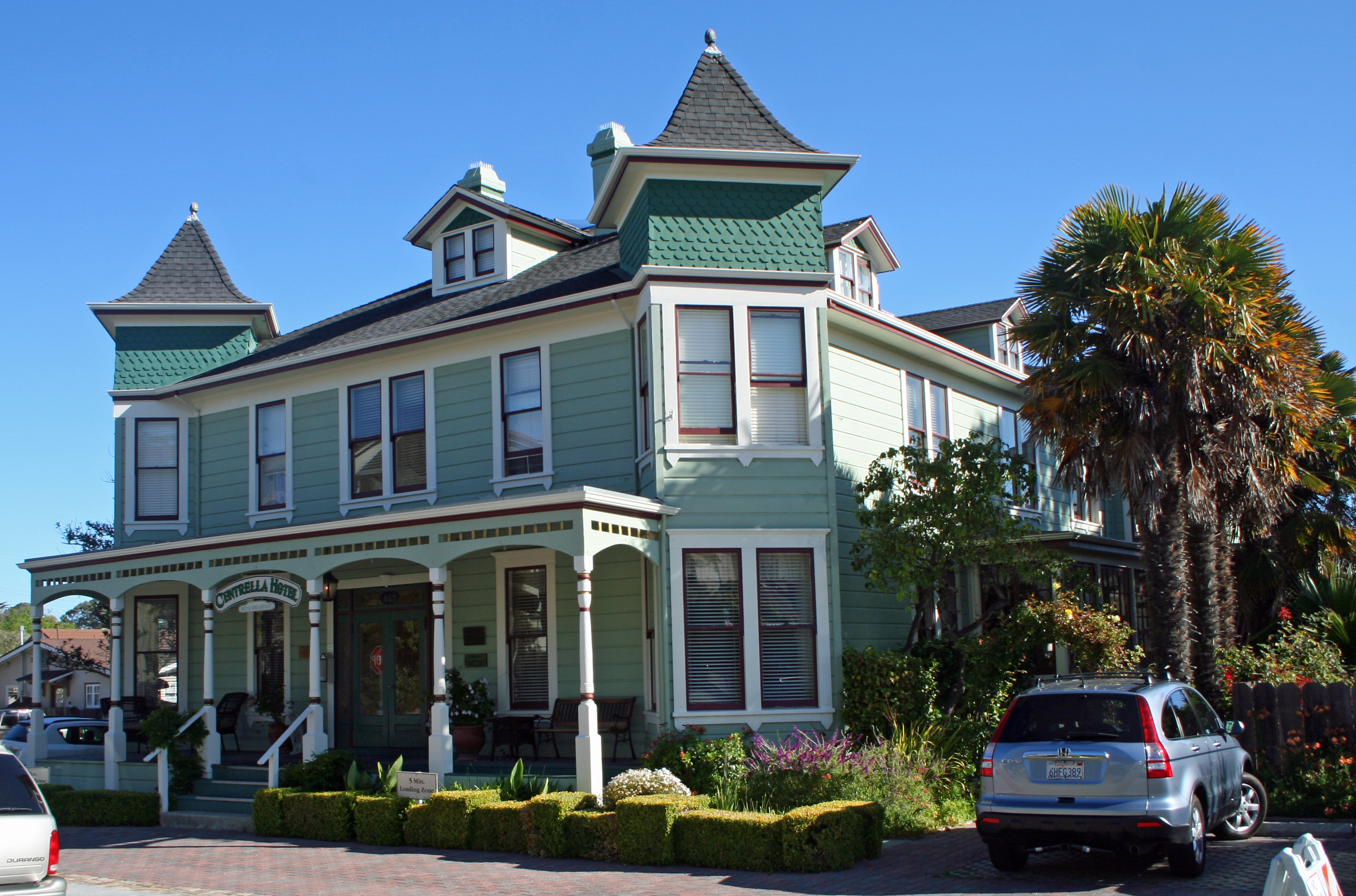

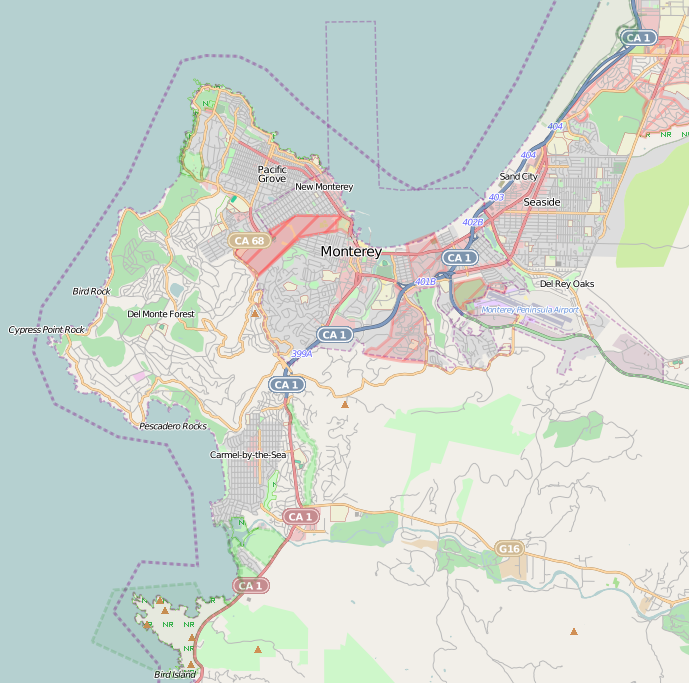
- Location within Monterey Peninsula Location within California Location within the United States
- Location: 612 Central Ave., Pacific Grove, California
- Coordinates: 36°37′22″N 121°55′0″W
- Area: 0.3 acres (0.12 ha)
- Built: 1888
- Architectural style: Vernacular
- NRHP reference No.: 82000973
- Added to NRHP: October 29, 1982

The Centrella Inn, at 612 Central Ave. and other addresses in Pacific Grove, California, United States, is a complex of four historic buildings that is listed on the National Register of Historic Places.

The first two buildings of the complex were built during 1888–89. It served the Methodist Chautauqua and other trade that grew rapidly in Pacific Grove following the Southern Pacific Railroad connection to the city, and following the 1887 fire at the historic Del Monte Hotel.

It was listed on the National Register in 1982; the listing included four contributing buildings, three being one-story and one being two and a half stories.
