= George Hough Dutton =

Biography of George Dutton

George Dutton
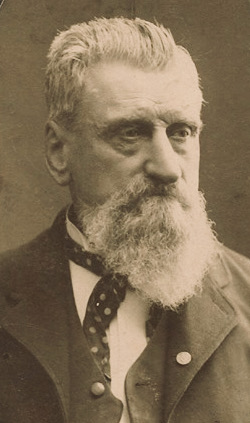
- George Dutton, ca. 1900s.
- Born: George Hough Dutton; August 20, 1825; Wallingford, Connecticut, US
- Died: June 28, 1905 (aged 79); Jolon, California, US
- Occupation: Merchant
- Spouse: Deborah Winslow Dodge
- Children: 7

George Hough Dutton (August 20, 1825 – June 28, 1905) was an American merchant and pioneer who came out west during the time of the California gold rush. He was a veteran of the American Civil War who served as a lieutenant in the Union Army. In 1866, Dutton settled in Jolon, California where he purchased the Antonio Ramirez adobe Inn in 1876 and converted it into a two-story hotel and stagecoach station. The hotel is now a landmark, named the Dutton Hotel, Stagecoach Station, which was listed on the National Register of Historic Places on October 14, 1971.

== Early life ==
He had been in Melbourne, Australia and reached California in 1849 during the Gold Rush.

During the American Civil War, Dutton enlisted as a Second lieutenant in the Union Army, Indian Guard, Company K, 5th California Infantry Regiment, organized at Santa Cruz, California on October 21, 1861, by Captain Thomas Theodore Tidball. The unit saw action in the Casa Blanco, Arizona and New Mexico Territories. On November 27, 1864, he was discharged in Kit Carson's command in Las Cruces, New Mexico.

Post-Civil War, Dutton married Deborah Winslow Dodge (1839-1896), of Watsonville, California, on July 2, 1866. She came with her family from Thomaston, Maine to San Francisco where she met Dutton. They had seven children. His son, Edwin Julian Dutton, became the Deputy Sheriff of Jolon.

== Career ==
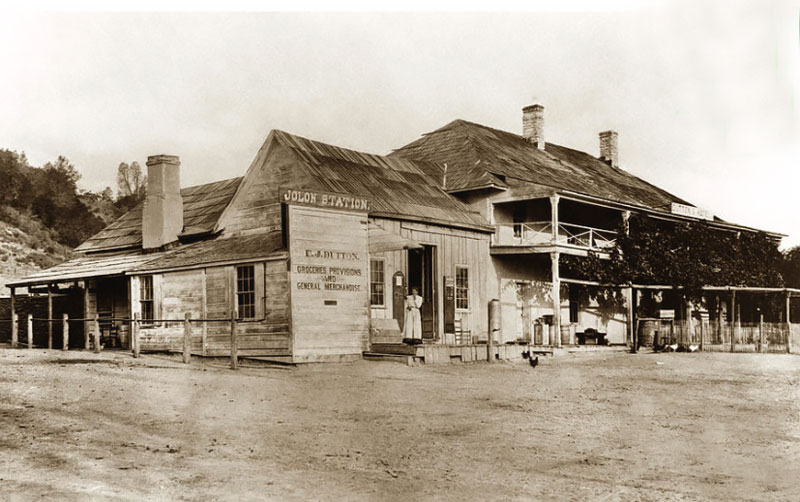
Dutton Hotel, Stagecoach Station, ca. 1903, in Jolon, California.

In 1866, George Dutton and his wife settled in Jolon, California. He came with his Civil War buddy, Captain Thomas T. Tidball. The Duttons were founding members of the St. Luke's Church Episcopal in Jolon. Dutton was one of the early settlers that took the Jolon land believing it was part of the public domain provided by the United States government. Faxon Atherton said that the settlers were squatting on his land and sent notice to evict them. The hotel changed owners several times before 1876, when Henry Clay Dodge, the brother of Dutton's wife, sold the land to Dutton and Captain Thomas T. Tidball for $1,000 and 100 acres. Dutton added a second adobe story, a merchandise store, saloon post office, and stagecoach stop, which started between Lowe's Station and Pleyto in Monterey County, California. Dutton's partnership with Captain Thomas T. Tidball was later dissolved and Tidball opened his own store and hotel called the Tidball Store.

On June 26, 1903, Dutton presented a collection or old Spanish relics and 500 Mission tales, from the Mission San Antonio de Padua, founded by Franciscan Fathers in 1771, to the Landmarks League, which is five miles to the west of Jolon.

Dutton's son, Edwin Julian Dutton (1870-1921), took over management of the hotel when he was 21. He died in 1921. In 1929, the hotel was sold to William Randolph Hearst by the Dutton's widow, to become part of Fort Hunter Liggett. Hearst removed the surrounding buildings and his hope was to restore the adobe in the old mission style and turn it into a museum, but never materialized.

In 1940, the United States Army acquired the property and the adobe was used as a recreation center and temporary camp. From 1950 to 1960, the building began to deteriorate. On August 16, 1969, the Monterey County surveyors and engineers surveyed the historic site. The roof had caved in the walls looked like they would not last the winter. On October 14, 1971, the Dutton Hotel was listed on the National Register of Historic Places.

== Death ==
Dutton was in poor health when he was taken from his home in Jolon to King City, California for medical treatment. He died on June 28, 1905, when he was 79 years old. He is buried next to his wife, as well as other Dutton family members, at the Jolon Cemetery.

== See also ==
- Dutton Hotel, Stagecoach Station
