= Thomas Theodore Tidball =

Biography of Thomas Theodore Tidball

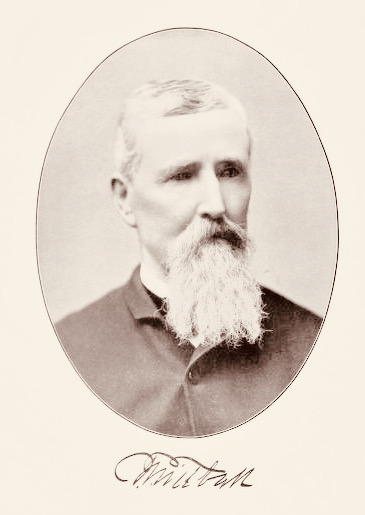
- Thomas Theodore Tidball, ca. 1900s.
- Born: Thomas Theodore Tidball; October 2, 1827; Allegheny, Pennsylvania, US
- Died: January 28, 1913 (aged 85); Monterey, California, US
- Occupation: Hotel Proprietor
- Title: Captain
- Spouse: Helen Mary Hill
- Children: 3

Thomas Theodore Tidball (October 2, 1827 – January 28, 1913) was an American pioneer who came out west during the time of the California gold rush. He was a veteran of the American Civil War who served as a captain in the Union Army. In 1866, Tidball settled in Jolon, California where he and George Dutton purchased the Antonio Ramirez adobe Inn in 1876 and converted it into a two-story hotel and stagecoach station. Tidball went on to establish his own General Store in 1890, which is now the only standing commercial building of Jolon. The Tidball Store is a landmark, which was listed on the National Register of Historic Places on December 12, 1976.

== Early life ==
His maternal grandfather was in the American Revolution. When he was a year old, his parents moved to Holmes County, Ohio and then to Mansfield, Ohio in 1838. In Mansfield, he learned from his father the hatter's trade. He later learned the printing business.

In 1846, he enlisted in Company A, Third Ohio Infantry for service in the Mexican War. After fourteen months as a private he was honorably discharged and returned to Mansfield where he began work as a clerk in a warehouse. In 1849, during the Gold Rush, Tidball left Ohio for California where he went looking for gold. He is listed in the 1850 United States Federal Census as mining in El Dorado County, California at age 28. For two years he worked in ranching near Sacramento. In 1853 he became a Mason and was master of the lodges at Santa Cruz and Castroville. He returned to Indiana where he was an editor on a paper at Albion, Indiana where he met and married Helen Mary Hill. They had three children. In 1857, Tidball came back to California and settled in Santa Cruz where he worked on a paper until the American Civil War broke out.

== American Civil War ==
On November 22, 1861, at the start of the Civil War, Captain Tidball organized a company of eighty men in the Indian Guard, Company K, 5th California Infantry Regiment, which was mustered into the Union Army at Camp Union near Sacramento. He then came to Santa Cruz, California; and then to Fort Yuma in Yuma, Arizona to fight the Apaches. On October 1, 1862, his company was sent to San Pedro, Arizona and then on February 1, 1863, they were sent to Tucson, Arizona where Tidball led an expedition against the Apache Indians. On February 5, 1863, Tidball led another expedition against the Apache Indians, killing eighty of the braves. Tidball had command of a post at Fort Bowie, Arizona Territory, from May 1863 to September 1864. On November 22, 1863, his unit saw action in the Casa Blanca, Arizona. On November 27, 1864, he was discharged in Kit Carson's command in Las Cruces, New Mexico.

The Society of Arizona Pioneers elected Captain Tidball as an honorary member in 1886 for his services in the Apache outbreaks. He won recognition for his bravery and gallantry in his promotion to Major and Brevet Major in the army.

== Career ==
Tidball returned to Santa Cruz and in the fall of 1865 was elected County Clerk. After two years he was appointed County Auditor and Internal Revenue Collector of the Santa Cruz second district. After two years he resigned and moved to Tulare County, California and ranched for one year. He went on to Cooper Ranch in Salinas Valley where he spent three years. In the 1870 United States Census he was listed as 42 years old and having a home in San Jose, Santa Clara, California. His occupation was as a printer.

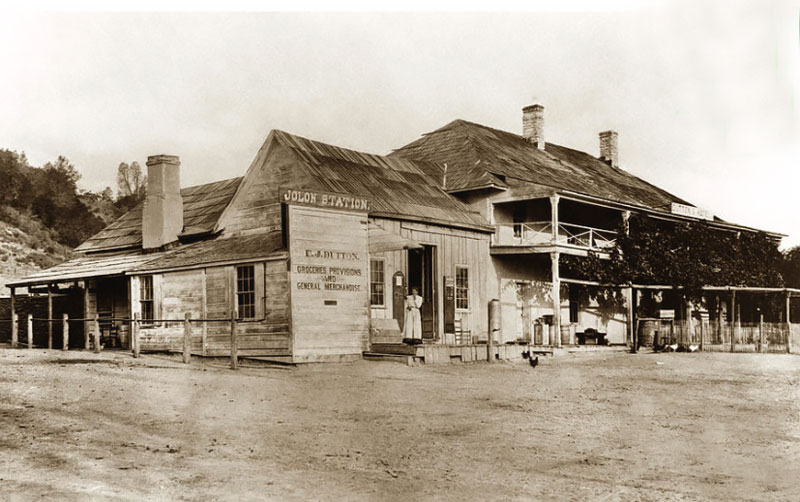
Dutton Hotel, Stagecoach Station, ca. 1903, in Jolon, California

In 1876, Tidball and his family settled in Jolon, California with Civil War buddy George Hough Dutton. Tidball and Dutton were early settlers that took the Jolon land believing it was part of the public domain provided by the United States government. Faxon Atherton said that the settlers were squatting on his land and sent notice to evict them. The hotel changed owners several times before 1876, when Henry Clay Dodge, the brother of Dutton's wife, sold the land to Tidball and Dutton, in partnership, for $1,000 and 100 acres. They added a second adobe story, a merchandise store, saloon post office, and stagecoach stop, which started between Lowe's Station and Pleyto in Monterey County, California.

After two years, the Tidball's partnership with Dutton was dissolved and the property became known as the Dutton Hotel, Stagecoach Station.

== Jolon Store ==
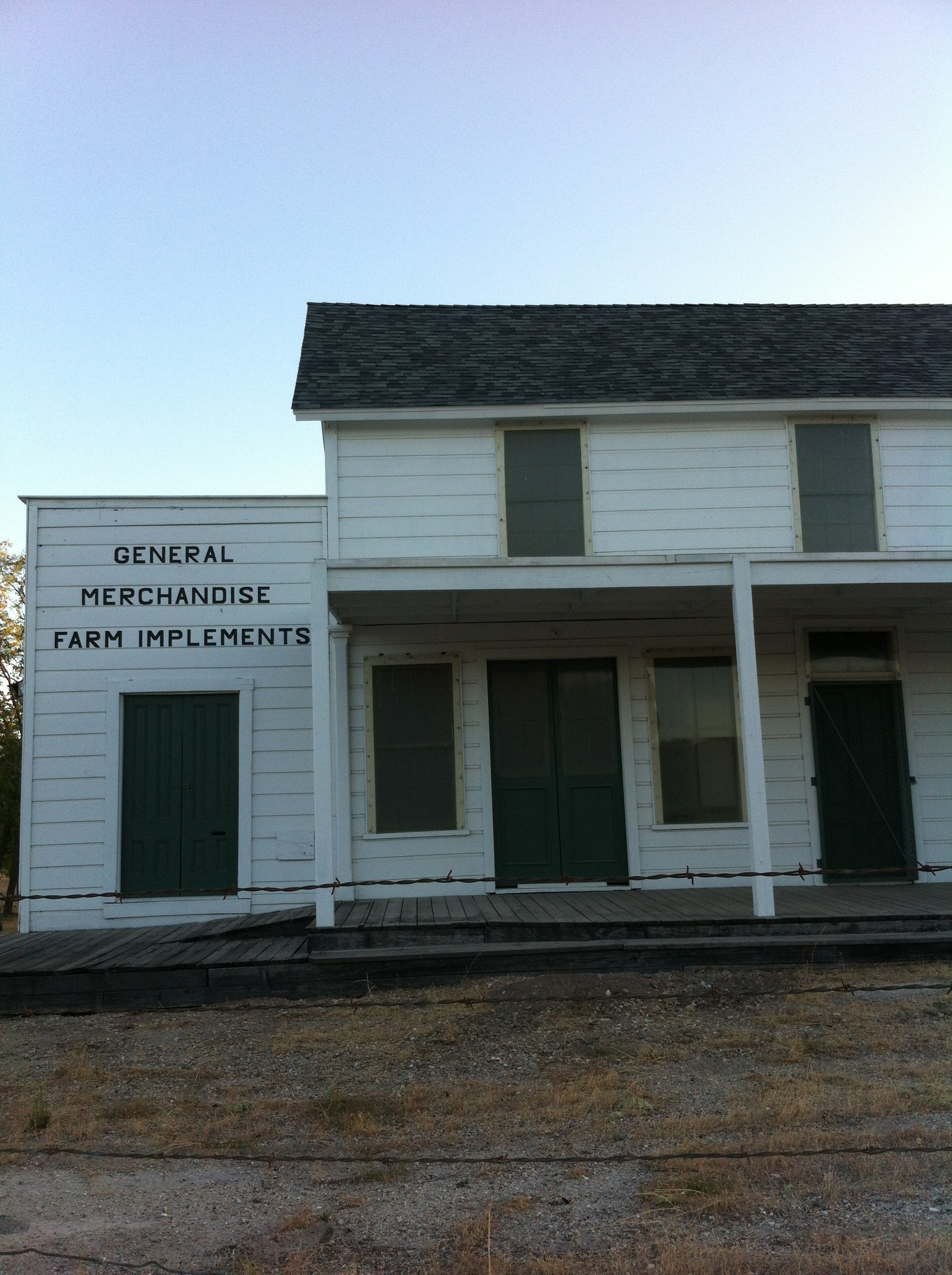
The Tidball Store

Tidball established his own hotel and general store in Jolon, 1/4 mile south of the Dutton Hotel. The Tidball Store was constructed from the remains of an old adobe inn built in 1868 by Flint & Bixby Stage Lines. Tidball supplied food, clothing, building supplies and other necessities to customers traveling through or to local ranchers and miners. Redwood framing and feed yards was added in 1890. Tidball served as postmaster in 1881. For sixteen years he was a notary public. He was registered with Republican party.

On February 5, 1906, Tidball sold his store and hotel at Jolon to Edward Ganoung. Tidball and his wife retired at their ranch a few miles in New Monterey. On December 29, 1908, T. T. Tidball was appointed Justice of the peace of Monterey township by the Board of Supervisors.

On September 19, 1948, the old Jolon store was replaced by a modern building called the San Antonio Curio Store. In the back room was an iron safe with the name "T. T. Tidball" painted across the top, which had valuables from the years that Jolon was a station on the stagecoach route to Los Angeles.

Today, except for minor alterations, the building looks as it did in 1890 when it was converted from an adobe way station to a proper retail store. It remains the only standing commercial building of Jolon, once a major community of southern Monterey County. The Tidball Store is listed on the National Register of Historic Places on December 12, 1976.

== Death ==
Tidball died on January 28, 1913, when he 85 years old. He was buried on February 1 with full masonic rites at the Monterey City Cemetery. The funeral took place from the Edward Roberts undertaker under the auspices of the Monterey Lodge No. 217, F. and A. M. The Grand Army Veterans and a large number of friends attended the funeral.

Over time, his headstone sank so on March 13, 2001, members of the Sons Of Union Veterans 10 Lincoln Camp, installed a new headstone at Tidball's grave.

== See also ==
- Dutton Hotel, Stagecoach Station
- National Register of Historic Places listings in Monterey County, California
