= Tidball =

Tidball is a surname. Notable people with the surname include:

- Derek Tidball, British theologian and sociologist
- Marie Tidball (born 1984), English academic, disability rights campaigner, and Labour Party member who was elected as Member of Parliament for Penistone and Stocksbridge in the 2024 general election
- Mary Elizabeth Tidball (1929–2014), American physiologist
- Jeff Tidball, American game designer
- John C. Tidball (1825–1906), American Union Army colonel during the Civil War
- Thomas Theodore Tidball (1827-1913), American pioneer and founder of the Tidball Store
- William Tidball (born 2000), British road and track cyclist
