= Mission San Antonio =

Mission San Antonio or San Antonio Mission may refer to:

- Alamo Mission in San Antonio (Mission San Antonio de Valero), site of the Battle of the Alamo
- Mission San Antonio de Padua, third of the 21 Franciscan missions in California
- Mission San Antonio de Pala, asistencia to Mission San Luis Rey in California
- Mission San Antonio de Senecu, defunct mission in present-day Senecu, Chihuahua
- San Antonio Missions, minor league baseball team
- San Antonio Missions National Historical Park, encompassing five missions in San Antonio, Texas
- San Antonio Missions (World Heritage Site)
- USNS Mission San Antonio (T-AO-119), oil tanker named after Mission San Antonio de Padua
