= Faxon Atherton =

American businessman, trader and landowner

Faxon Dean Atherton
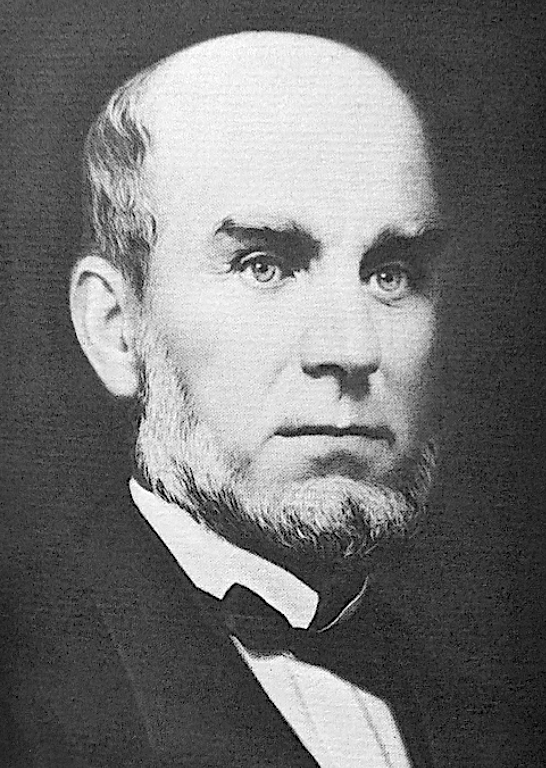
- Born: January 29, 1815; Dedham, Massachusetts, U.S.
- Died: July 18, 1877 (aged 62); San Mateo County, California, U.S.
- Spouse: Dominga Rosario Goñi Prieto (m. 1843–1877)
- Children: 7

Faxon Dean Atherton (1815–1877) was an American businessman, trader and landowner; initially successful in Valparaíso, Chile. He became a prominent citizen of San Mateo County, California. The town of Atherton, California is named after him.

== Early life ==
Faxon Dean Atherton was born on January 29, 1815, in Dedham, Massachusetts into an established New England family, with roots dating back to the colonial period of the United States. He was the son of Abner Atherton and Betsey Dean of Dedham, Massachusetts. His father was a sea captain, first married to Catherine Dean, and after her death, married her sister Betsy, who became Atherton's mother.

== Boston merchant ==
In 1830, Atherton entered the shipping and merchant business at the age of 15 as an apprentice to his brother-in-law, merchant Charles T. Ward. It was a time of growth in trade between the Massachusetts shoe and leather goods mills which needed raw hides from California and Chile. William Sturgis was among the most prominent at this time in the hide and tallow trade primarily focused on the California hide trade. Within two years, Atherton started his own hauling business in Boston, Massachusetts, in 1832. This was not enough for young Atherton, who also established a parcel delivery service for merchants.

Atherton was intent on making his fortune in the Pacific Coast Trade. He had accumulated sufficient capital for such an overseas enterprise. He chose South America to seek his fortune, and left Boston on the Boston Ship "Mercury" in 1833, with a motley of cargo goods valued at $500. It included cigars, cologne, brushes, shoes, other leather goods and German harps. Upon arrival in Valparaiso, Chile he quickly sold all his cargo to Augustus Hemenway's commission firm, sharing the profits with his partner, Robert P. Ross.

Initially, Atherton speculated in cargo in Valparaiso. He got to know Elishu Loring, a shipping agent and secured a position with Loring & Co, a ship chandlery firm. He was made responsible for the operation of vessels plying between Boston - Valparaíso, Chile and Monterey, California. After working in Chile for a year he sailed to Oahu in November 1835 to investigate business opportunities there.

== Oahu and California (1836–1839) ==
His friend and business associate in the hide and tallow trade, Thomas Larkin had previously urged Atherton to move to California. Larkin wrote:

"... [T]here is education available for your children and a dignity of living on landed estates down the San Francisco peninsula (that is) convenient and accessible ... [Y]ou and I were of that country. Our eyes were turned towards it in admiration and in my part in gratitude. My children were from there. They and yours will soon be."

Whilst in Oahu, Atherton met Captain Alpheus Basil Thompson (1795–1869), a seagoing merchant from Santa Barbara, who was originally from Brunswick, Maine, who by the 1830s had become engaged in the hides and tallow trade along the Californian coastline. Thompson had married into the powerful Carrillo family. This would have opened doors for Atherton, who became acquainted with influential Californian leaders, both Mexican officials and American entrepreneurs, as well the foremost influential Californios; including the Vallejos, Bandinis, and De la Guerras.

When Atherton traveled to Alta California with Thompson on the ship Bolivar Libertador in 1836, arriving in San Francisco, the city was in its infancy. Atherton worked for Thompson for a period of two years, initially accepting a position as a clerk for $50 a month. He would soon be tasked to travel the California coast, between San Francisco and San Diego, selling goods to rancheros from Thompson's home port of Santa Barbara. During this period, Atherton penned his California diary and formed friendships with many prominent Californians, including Carlos Antonio Carrillo, José Antonio Carrillo, Mariano Guadalupe Vallejo, Juan Bandini and Thomas O. Larkin, the United States Consul at Monterey (with whom he would later be associated with in many real estate and commercial ventures). Several governors of the Mexican era were also his friends, among them Nicolas Gutierrez, José Castro, and Mariano Chico, as were many traders such as W. E. P. Hartnell, Nathan Spear; and the latter's nephew, William Heath Davis, Jr.

This was time of influx of settlers from New England into the Pacific coast. His friend, William Heath Davis came from a Boston seafaring, ship-owning family. Davis was a clerk of a store in Monterey which was owned by his uncle, Nathan Spear. Like Atherton he liked the daughters of powerful men. Davis engaged in trading trips to Yerba Buena and the Hawaiian Islands and settled permanently in San Francisco, subsequently becoming one of the city's most prominent merchants and ship owners. Davis later married María de Jesús Estudillo, daughter of Joaquin Estudillo, a wealthy rancher.

In 1839 Atherton was described by John Sutter as an upstanding merchant from Honolulu who later moved to California (although Atherton's own diary brings his moral character into question - see "Legacy," below). Sutter enjoyed dining with Atherton during his stay in Honolulu, whilst he waited for a boat to take him to California. During 1839, Atherton left Oahu on the Don Quixote, and sailed back to New England (via Valparaíso and Cape Horn) with 540 hides valued at $1000. He arrived in Boston during May and sold his cargo in Boston. Whilst in Boston he tried unsuccessfully to raise $4,500 to build a highway between Valparaiso and Santiago. Instead he returned to Chile with a $259 rotary printing press and a supply of enamel "address cards".

He established a ship chandler's store in Valparaiso, whilst at the same time trading in the hide and tallow and other merchandise. It was during this time that he met George Henry Bowen, who would become his business partner and lifelong friend.

== Chile (1839–1858) ==
In Valparaiso he was a successful merchant, dealing in hides and tallow, foodstuffs, and other commodities. As such he was a desirable bachelor, and in 1843 he married into a prominent Chilean family and soon had a family. He wrote to his friend Thomas Larkin in California during August 1843 to say that he had married the previous month. Atherton's letter provides an insight for historians into the trade route in place at the time between Valparaíso, Mazatlán, and San Francisco.

Between 1841 and 1846 Atherton had tried to lure Thomas Larkin into the Valparaiso lumber market. Although Atherton assured him that goods in Chile were cheaper, Larkin did not become interested in this trade, instead focusing on the Pacific Coast of Mexico.

During the Mexican–American War from 1846 to 1848, Atherton's wealth increased steadily and he wrote to Thomas Larkin that he had accepted drafts for $300,000 from whalers that had all been honored.

=== Views on annexation of California ===
Atherton was an enthusiastic supporter of the Annexation of California. He had followed events from Chile and Tahiti, and was very much in favor of it being incorporated into the United States. Whilst in Tahiti, he wrote to commercial associates in 1843 saying:

I hope that the U.S. will acquire California by purchase or otherwise, as it is a most beautiful country very similar to Chile.

Early in 1846, Thomas Larkin had received instructions from Secretary of State James Buchanan to begin working covertly to assure all concerned that the United States would support any attempt at secession from Mexico. The Treaty of Guadalupe Hidalgo officially titled the Treaty of Peace, Friendship, Limits and Settlement between the United States of America and the Mexican Republic, was signed on February 2, 1848, between the United States and Mexico that ended the Mexican–American War (1846–1848). The treaty called for the U.S. to pay US$15 million to Mexico and to pay off the claims of American citizens against Mexico up to US$5 million. It gave the United States the Rio Grande as a boundary for Texas, and gave the U.S. ownership of California. Mexicans in those annexed areas had the choice of relocating to within Mexico's new boundaries or receiving American citizenship with full civil rights. This would open great opportunities for Atherton, along with the California gold rush, where Atherton would subsequently amass a great fortune from his many enterprises; his shipping business and the import and export of goods.

In 1848, Atherton corresponded with Thomas Larkin over the disappearance of his brother, Robert in Mazatlán the previous year. Atherton's brother was at the time working for Thomas Larkin on a Gold project in Mazatlán. A year later his brother got promoted to emigration as part of the gold rush, which Atherton had at the time dismissed.

=== Atherton's perspective on the California Gold Rush ===
Atherton was skeptical at first witnessing gold seekers leaving Valparaíso for California. Instead he had hoped coal would be found.

Thomas Larkin wrote to Atherton during 1849 on California's first boom:

"JAN. 19, 1849

We yet remain in a quiet state under the combined influence of some gospel and plenty of law, the beauty of the first exemplified in many who attend church from early habits or to set an example without caring much what creed they listen to, only being aware that the preacher is a fine looking man and his sermon is orthodox, in quality and quantity. The law we have or live under is brief and accommodating, each party concerned bringing proof that either the laws of Mexico or the U.S. are or ought to be in force. The defenders of the latter are rather split into small parties as each advocates the law of his native state as the only just and true one"......"Law, gospel and politics are beginning to be obsolete in the great eagerness to obtain a share of the [gold] placer. Last July gold diggers were satisfied to obtain 2 or 3 ounces of gold per day. Now they throw up spade and pickaxe if they do not find every heave or two a "junk" of gold. Up to $600 have been [paid] for single lumps."

"Many young men, who in May 1847 had less than $400, are now doing well and worth $5,000 to $30,000. … People come in by the hundreds, where they sleep I know not … My head whirls with speculation! My hair grows grey by the excessive working of my brain and ambitions! … Every one is becoming rich!"

By 1850, both Atherton and George Bowen had joined Loring & Co, Valparaíso as partners. It would take a further eight years and the failing health of Thomas Larkin for Atherton to make the decision to settle permanently with his Chilean family in California.

== California (1858–1877) ==
Atherton arrived with his family from Chile in 1858. His friend Thomas Larkin, who at the time of his death was one of the richest individuals in San Francisco, had died of Typhoid that same year. Atherton went on to become one of the wealthiest men on the Pacific Coast, making extensive investments in California commerce and real estate.

=== Expansion into California ===
In 1853, he hired San Francisco agent Alexander B. Grogan to represent his interests in California. However it would not be until 1860 that Atherton would return to California to settle permanently.

By the 1860s Atherton had settled with his family in the then-fashionable section of San Francisco, Rincon Hill. Other residents included the Latham's, Ralstons, Millses, Stanford's, Sharon's, Donohoes, Floods, O'Briens, Fairs, Selby's and Eyre's. Atherton wanted to be in the company of those who built not just the banks and railroads of the American West, but the cultural and intellectual institutions as well.

Atherton focused on ensuring his daughters married into other influential families, and they did, by marrying into the Macondray, Selby and Eyre families.

Atherton had a business acquaintance with Guillermo Castro, a rancher, surveyor and a former magistrate under the Mexican administration, who had turned to selling large parcels of land in order to reduce his gambling debt. Atherton would lend him money; however, he took ownership of the land when Castro defaulted on his debt. Castro's final rancho was sold in 1864 to Atherton for $400,000, with a now destitute Castro leaving for Chile.

Atherton in turn began selling off his portion in smaller parcels. Two men named Cull (the namesake of Cull Canyon) and Luce bought some 2,400 acres (10 km^{2}) and began running a steam-operated saw mill in Redwood Canyon. The Jensen brothers also bought land from Atherton in 1867.

=== Valparaiso Park ===
Atherton is credited with initiating the custom of owning a country house on the Peninsula, and was soon followed by other prominent San Francisco families—the Selbys, the Floods, the Macondrays, and later the Hopkins and the Stanfords.

Atherton had chosen to liquidate all his assets in Chile and reinvested heavily into California. His real estate purchases included Valparaiso Park in San Mateo County; the land now forms much of present-day Atherton. This included 640 acres (2.6 km^{2}) at ten dollars an acre of land on the San Francisco peninsula in what was then known as Fair Oaks, becoming one of the first residents of the area. He built his home, Valparaíso Park, situated approximately where the Menlo Circus Club, 190 Park Lane, Atherton has operated as a private country club since 1923.

=== Land speculation and disputes ===
Atherton's familiarity with the grazing lands in the vicinity of Mision San Jose dated back to 1836, together with his accumulated wealth, fuelled his land purchases between the 1850s to 1875. These included:

- Rancho Milpitas in the area of Fort Hunter Liggett (Monterey County): Atherton acquired title from Ygnacio Pastor immediately upon its title clearance by the US Land Claims commission in 1875.
- Corralitos
- Rancho Bolsa de San Cayetano in Monterey County
- Rancho Cañada de la Segunda
- Rancho Los Putos in Solano County
- Rancho Salsipuedes, (Spanish for "leave while you can"), Santa Cruz County
- Rancho San Lorenzo in Alameda County
- Tracts of land in Watsonville
- Various lots of land in Hayward, Alameda County

Many of the above were subject to court claims by former rancheros such as the Vallejo family. During the conversion of land, records under the Land Commission were changed and Ygnacio's small ranch grew from several thousand acres to 42,000 acres (170 km^{2}). Owners of plots dating back to the Hispanic period, including Indians, Mexicans, and Spaniards, on land not originally owned by Pastor became squatters overnight. Atherton then sent notice to evict them. Many were settlers on improved lands were awaiting pre-emption, including George Hough Dutton and others who had believed they owned property in the town of Jolon. Dutton bought an Inn and 100 acres on the property for $1,000, now called the Dutton Hotel, Stagecoach Station. He added a second adobe story, a merchandise store, saloon post office, and stagecoach stop.

=== Board membership and other business interests ===
Atherton became prominent in banking, financial enterprises and railroad building, with projects such as the Oregon and California Railroad. He played an instrumental role in the construction of a railroad in Hayward.

He served on the board of trustees of the Lick Trust from 1875. This trust had been set up initially by James Lick in 1874 but he replaced the board with Atherton, John Nightingale, Bernard D. Murphy and John H. Lick.

== Personal ==
After a period of courtship, Atherton married Dominga Rosario Goñi Prieto (1823–1890) on July 7, 1843, in Valparaíso, Chile. His wife was born on August 4, 1823, into a prominent Valparaíso family. Biographers have described her as a plump, witty young woman. She spoke no English. Although Atherton was not a Catholic by birth, they were married by the Catholic Church in Valparaíso, since she was a devout Catholic. Biographers have described Atherton as a persistent womanizer, for having had a string of affairs.

=== The children of Faxon Dean Atherton and Dominga Goñi De Atherton ===
The couple had nine children (with seven children reaching adulthood); all but one child (Florence) was born in Chile.

1. Maria Alejandra (Atherton) Rathbone (1844–1913). Born on May 7, 1844, in Valparaiso, Chile. Maria married Jared Lawrence Rathbone (1844-1907) of Albany, New York; the son of Jared Lewis Rathbone, the first elected Mayor of Albany. In 1865 his brother Henry Rathbone had attempted to subdue John Wilkes Booth after he had shot Abraham Lincoln.
2. Elena or Helena Amanda (Atherton) Selby (1845–1906). Elena was born on December 5, 1845, in Valparaíso, Chile. She married Captain Frederick William Macondray, Jr (1840–1884) of Boston, Massachusetts, the son of one of the first merchants of San Francisco and large land owner. Subsequently she became the wife of Percival W. Selby (1864–1927), the son of Thomas Henry Selby (1820–1875). Died Jun 1, 1906, aged 60 in Menlo Park. Some records indicate that her name was Dominga Helena.
3. Anacleto Francisco Atherton (1849–1891) was also known as Frank. He was born on June 16, 1849, in Valparaíso, Chile. He died on October 18, 1891, in Madrid, Spain, aged 42.
4. George H. B. Atherton (1851–1887) was also known as Jorge H. Bowen Atherton. He married Gertrude Franklin Horn (1857–1948), known as the successful author Gertrude Atherton. He initially dated her mother, but decided to elope with Gertrude in 1876.
5. Eulogia Isabel (Atherton) Edwards (1853–1902). Eulogia was known as Isabel and was born on October 19, 1853, in Valparaíso, Chile. She married Enrique Edwards, a member of the Edwards family of Valparaíso, Chile as Eulogia Isabel Atherton Goñi (in line with Chilean tradition she took her mother's name). A descendant of this line includes Lionel Edwards Atherton.
6. Faxon Dean Atherton, Jr (1855–1922) was also known as Francisco Fascon Atherton was born on September 12, 1857, in Valparaíso, Chile. He married "Jeanie" (also known as Jane/Jenny) Selby, the daughter of Thomas Henry Selby.
7. Florence (Atherton) Eyre (1861–1934). She was born 1861. In 1886 she married Edward 'Ed' Lilburn Eyre., the first mayor of Atherton, California.

His daughter Florence has been confused by researchers with Florence Atherton Spalding, who was a Boston music teacher, who also married in 1886.

=== Death ===
Atherton died in Valparaiso Park on July 18, 1877. His wife died on September 20, 1890, in San Francisco, aged 67. He is buried at the Holy Cross Catholic Cemetery in Colma, San Mateo County, California.

== Legacy ==
After Atherton's death, Alexander B. Grogan served as the executor of his estate.

=== The California Diary of Faxon Dean Atherton 1836–1839 ===
Atherton gave an eyewitness account as a twenty-one year old Bostonian of his hide and tallow trading days in Mexican California. It also makes references to historic sites such as the Mission San José and Mission Santa Clara de Asís, and the settlement of Alviso and areas of San Francisco Bay. The California Diary of Faxon Dean Atherton 1836 - 1839 was published in 1964 by the California Historical Society and edited by the historian and former professor at UCLA, Doyce B. Nunis Jr.

The publication of Atherton's California Journal has been described as a singular event in the recorded history of California. As a young man from New England, Atherton vividly recorded much of the turbulent change and innovation in the California of the 1830s. The Editor of the journal, Dr. Nunis was the editor of the Southern California Quarterly during the 1960s and when promoting his book in the December 1964 edition of The California Historical Society Quarterly was quoted saying:

"Since Atherton begins where Richard Henry Dana leaves off, his diary is not an unworthy companion to Dana's classic.

Previous authors have referred to the "gamey passages" (as on pp. 122 and 144) in his journal. Several pages are also missing and researchers have indicated they may have been removed in an attempt to preserve the perception of his character as moral. In fact, Atherton himself wrote of raping Indigenous girls at Mission San José during a night he spent there in 1836.

"All the young girls of the Mission [sic] are kept locked up nights by themselves. They are under the charge of a man who is called an Alcalde, but I found that he knew the value of a 4 real piece and understood what he received it for. There are some pretty fair girls amongst them, and what is more, devilish neat and clean. The large ovens for baking they have here are fine handy things.

=== Atherton House ===
His widow was responsible for building "Atherton House" 1990, California Street, San Francisco (located on the corner with Octavia Street) in 1881. National Register #79000527. Faxon's son George had died at sea in 1887 and his body was shipped back to the house in a barrel of rum, as a result it is rumored that the house is haunted with his spirit.

=== Family papers ===
The Faxon Dean Atherton family papers are held by the California Historical Society. Other papers are held at Berkeley, California.

=== Town of Atherton, California ===
The town of Atherton, previously known as "Fair Oaks" is named after him. During the 1920s the Fair Oaks (Atherton) town fathers had wanted to retain the name of Fair Oaks, commemorating both the town's native oak trees and the Union Army's victory at Fair Oaks, Virginia, in 1862. Unfortunately, the name was already taken by a suburb of Sacramento, so after a shortlist, Atherton was chosen as the towns new name in honor of one of the first principal landowners. The town was incorporated on September 12, 1923. However, as early as 1912, it was already being referred to by that name. Some of his children's names appear on West Atherton street signs: Isabella, Alejandra and Elena.

== Ancestry ==
Atherton was a New England descendant of Puritan heritage, whose ancestors had settled in Massachusetts Colony. He is a direct descendant of James Atherton, one of the First Settlers of New England; who arrived in Dorchester, Massachusetts, in the 1630s. His relatives include Charles Humphrey Atherton, Cornelius Atherton, Joseph Ballard Atherton, Joshua Atherton and Uriah A. Boyden.
