= Tidball Store =

Historic building in Jolon, California

- U.S. National Register of Historic Places
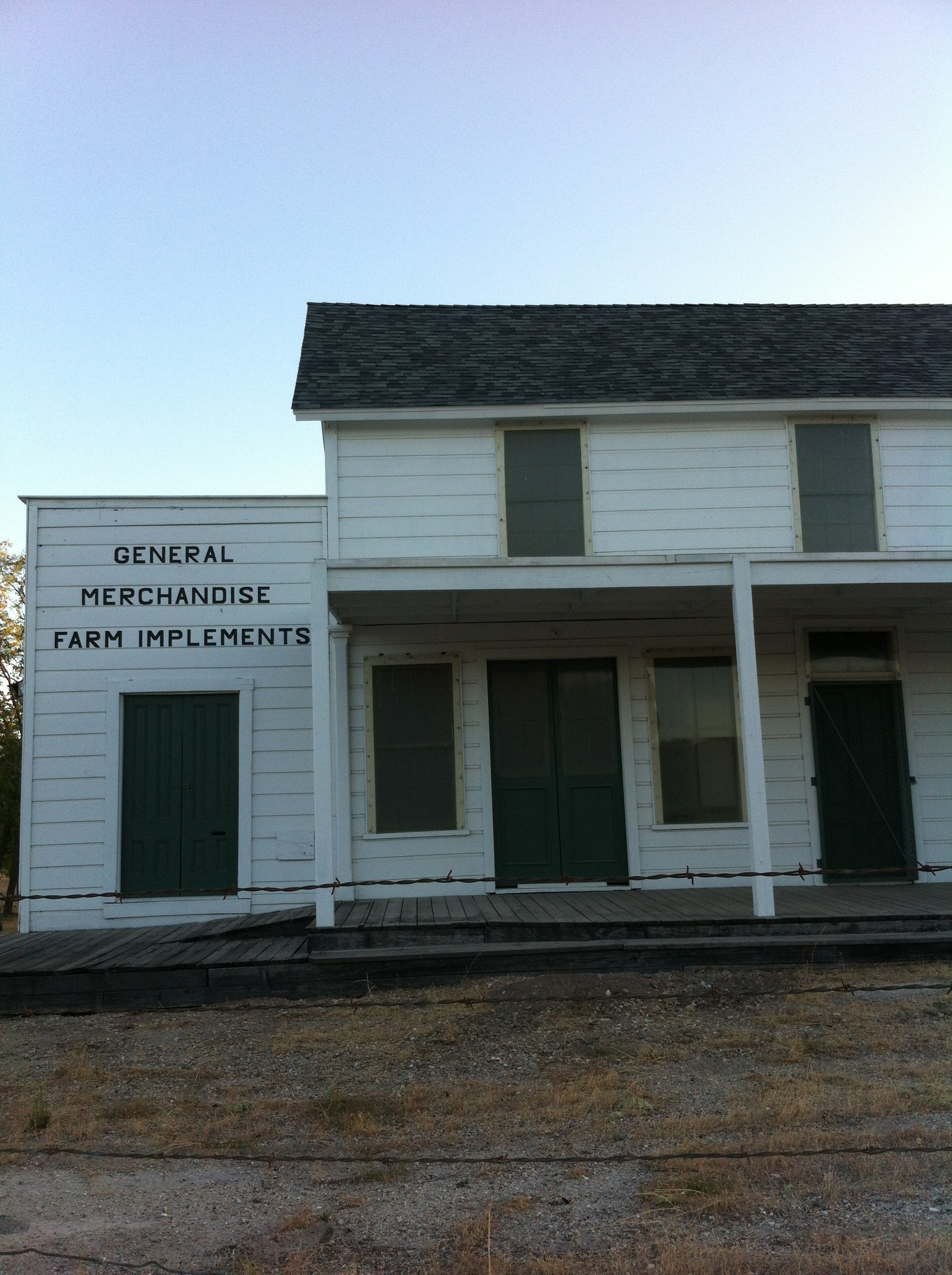
- Tidball Store, ca. 2016, Jolon, California

- Location within California Location within the United States
- Location: Jolon
- Coordinates: 35°58′16″N 121°10′29″W
- Area: 1 acre (0.40 ha)
- Built: 1890
- Architectural style: Monterey Colonial
- NRHP reference No.: 76000503
- Added to NRHP: December 12, 1976

Tidball Store or Jolon General Store is located off Jolon Road in Jolon, California, United States, ^{1}/_{4} mile south of the Dutton Hotel, Stagecoach Station. The store was constructed by pioneer, Thomas Theodore Tidball, from the remains of an old adobe inn, built in 1868 by Flint & Bixby Stage Lines. Tidball supplied food, clothing, building supplies and other necessities to customers traveling through and to local ranchers and miners. The store was a major stagecoach stop on the old El Camino Real in the late 1880s. The landmark was listed on the National Register of Historic Places on December 12, 1976. It is the only standing commercial building of Jolon, once a major community of southern Monterey County.

== History ==
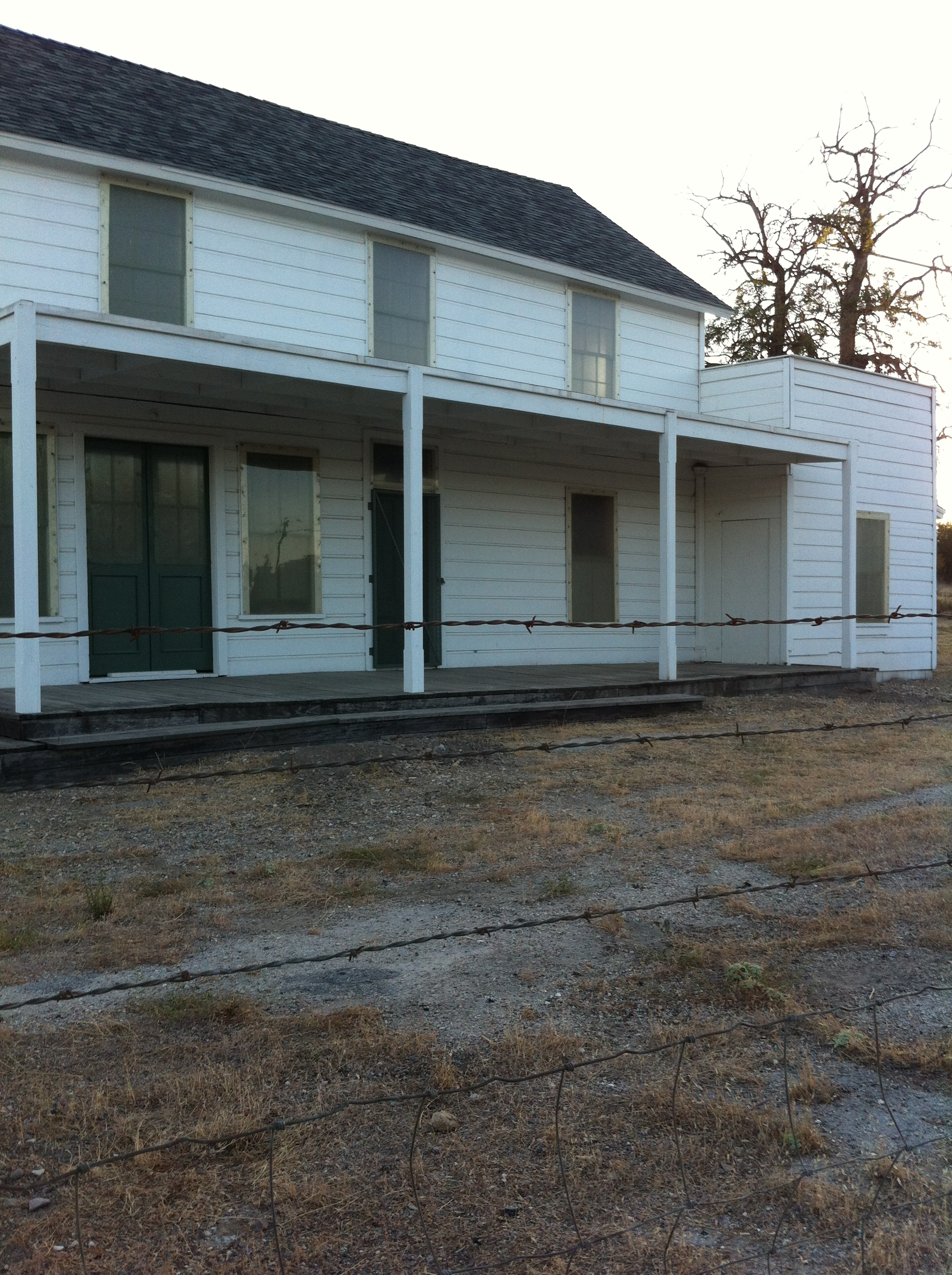
Tidball Store

The Tidball Store is located off Jolon Road, near the junction of Hunter-Ligget Military Reservation Road in Jolon, California. The road once followed the trail of the Portolá expedition of 1769. The store was constructed by pioneer, Thomas Theodore Tidball, from the remains of an old adobe inn, built in 1868 by Flint & Bixby Stage Lines. The store was a became a major stagecoach stop on the route for travelers between San Francisco and Los Angeles in the late 19th-century. Lieutenant George Hough Dutton (1825–1905) had a competing hotel and store in Jolon, which Tidball once owned and were partners, but he soon established his own country store. Five miles to the west was the Mission San Antonio de Padua, founded by Franciscan Fathers in 1771. The General Store was a supplier of foodstuffs, clothing, building supplies and other necessities to customers traveling through or to local ranchers and miners. Redwood framing and feed yards was added in 1890. Although the store operated from 1850 until today, its heyday was from 1875 until 1910. In 1910, when US-101 was rerouted to bypass Jolon by nearly twenty miles, the town became a ghost town within a few years.

On October 18, 1892, the store was listed as a voting place under the list of Boards of Election for San Antonio Valley, California.

On February 5, 1906, Tidball sold his store at Jolon to Edward Ganoung. Tidball and his wife retired at their ranch a few miles in New Monterey.

On September 19, 1948, the old Jolon store was replaced by a modern building called the San Antonio Curio Store. In the back room was an iron safe with the name "T. T. Tidball" painted across the top, which had valuables from the years that Jolon was a station on the stagecoach route to Los Angeles. Since 1950, the building was used as a store with living quarters for the owners on the second floor.

On December 12, 1976, the Tidball Store was listed on the National Register of Historic Places. Efforts have been made to preserve and restore the store. On October 5, 1990, a plaque and monument were placed at the Tidball Store during a noon dedication ceremony by the Monterey Viejo Chapter 1846 of the E. Clampus Vitus historical benevolent organization. The San Antonio Valley Historical Association had been restoring the store since 1976. The building will be used as a museum. On March 27, 2015, the United States Army Fort Hunter Liggett held a ceremony for the transfer of 2.5 acres of land around the Tidball Store from the US Army to the County of Monterey.

Today, except for minor alterations, the building looks as it did in 1890 when it was converted from an adobe way station to a retail store. It remains as the only standing commercial building of Jolon, once a major community of southern Monterey County.

== See also ==
- National Register of Historic Places listings in Monterey County, California
