= Lionel Edwards Atherton =

Chilean politician (1888–1948)

Member of the Chamber of Deputies
- In office 15 May 1937 – 24 April 1948
- Constituency: 17th Departmental Group

Personal details
- Born: 28 June 1888 Valparaíso, Chile
- Died: 24 April 1948 (aged 59) Viña del Mar, Chile
- Party: Radical Party
- Spouse(s): Carolina Orrego Salazar (1916–1925); Esther Orrego Salazar (1926–1940); Eliana Dumás Sotomayor (1943–1948)
- Children: María Ester Edwards Orrego
- Profession: Engineer; Agricultural entrepreneur

Lionel Edwards Atherton (28 June 1888 – 24 April 1948) was a Chilean engineer and politician belonging to the Radical Party of Chile.

He served as a Member of the Chamber of Deputies across three consecutive legislative periods between 1937 and 1948.

== Early life and education ==
Edwards was born in Valparaíso, the son of Enrique Edwards Garriga and Isabel Atherton Goñi.

He studied at the Mackay School in Valparaíso, the Colegio de los Sagrados Corazones de Santiago and the Military School of the Libertador Bernardo O'Higgins. He later pursued higher studies in the United States, where he graduated as an engineer.

== Personal life ==
He married Carolina Orrego Salazar in Copiapó in 1916. After her death, he married her sister, Esther Orrego Salazar, in 1926; they had one daughter, María Ester Edwards Orrego. His third marriage, in 1943, was to Eliana Dumás Sotomayor.

== Professional career ==
Edwards worked from a young age in mining activities in the Copiapó area. He was administrator of the Trasandino Railway via Antuco and owned agricultural estates, including “El Naranjo” and “Relbún” in San Carlos.

== Political career ==
A member of the Radical Party of Chile, he was appointed delegate to the party's Central Board in 1933, served as President of the Industrial Congress of Santiago in 1935, and became national vice-president of the Radical Party in 1936.

He was elected to the Chamber of Deputies for the 17th Departmental Group (Talcahuano, Tomé, Concepción and Yumbel) for the 1937–1941 term, serving on the Standing Committee on Economy and Trade.

Re-elected for 1941–1945, he served on the Standing Committee on Mining and Industry.

He was again returned for the 1945–1949 legislative period, joining the Standing Committee on Agriculture and Colonisation. Edwards died in office on 24 April 1948, fewer than eleven months before the next parliamentary election; under the Chilean Constitution of 1925, his seat was not filled.

== Ancestry ==
His Atherton ancestors settled in Massachusetts Colony. He is a direct descendant of Faxon Atherton and James Atherton, one of the First Settlers of New England; who arrived in Dorchester, Massachusetts, in the 1630s. His relatives include Charles Humphrey Atherton, Cornelius Atherton, Joseph Ballard Atherton, Joshua Atherton and Uriah A. Boyden.
