= Juan Bautista Sancho =

Spanish composer

Joan Batista Sanxo, or Juan Bautista Sancho, (1772 or 1776 in Artà, Mallorca, Spain – 1830 in Mission San Antonio de Padua, California) was a Spanish composer and scholar. He brought to California some of the first samples of 18th-century European music, including sacred plainchant, sacred polyphony, as well as opera excerpts and instrumental arrangements with basso continuo. In 1803, he arrived in Mexico from his native Majorca and, in 1804, he settled in Mission San Antonio, where he remained until his death in 1830. He co-wrote a curious Interrogatorio, reporting on the conditions of the natives, their social customs, their local flora, and even their music. He also compiled vocabularies of several of their languages. As a composer, his Misa en Sol and Misa de los Angeles are among his best works.

== See also ==
- Magin Catalá
- José Francisco Ortega

== Bibliography ==
- Craig H. Russell, From Serra to Sancho: Music and Pageantry in the California Missions, (Oxford: Oxford University Press, 2009). ISBN 978-0-19-534327-4
- Antoni Pizà, ed.; William J. Summers; Craig H. Russell; Antoni Gili: J.B. Sancho: Pioneer Composer of California, Palma: Universitat de les Illes Balears, 2007. ISBN 978-84-7632-342-7
