= The Hacienda (Milpitas Ranchhouse) =

Coordinates: 36.0105°N 121.2427°W

- Milpitas Ranch house
- U.S. National Register of Historic Places
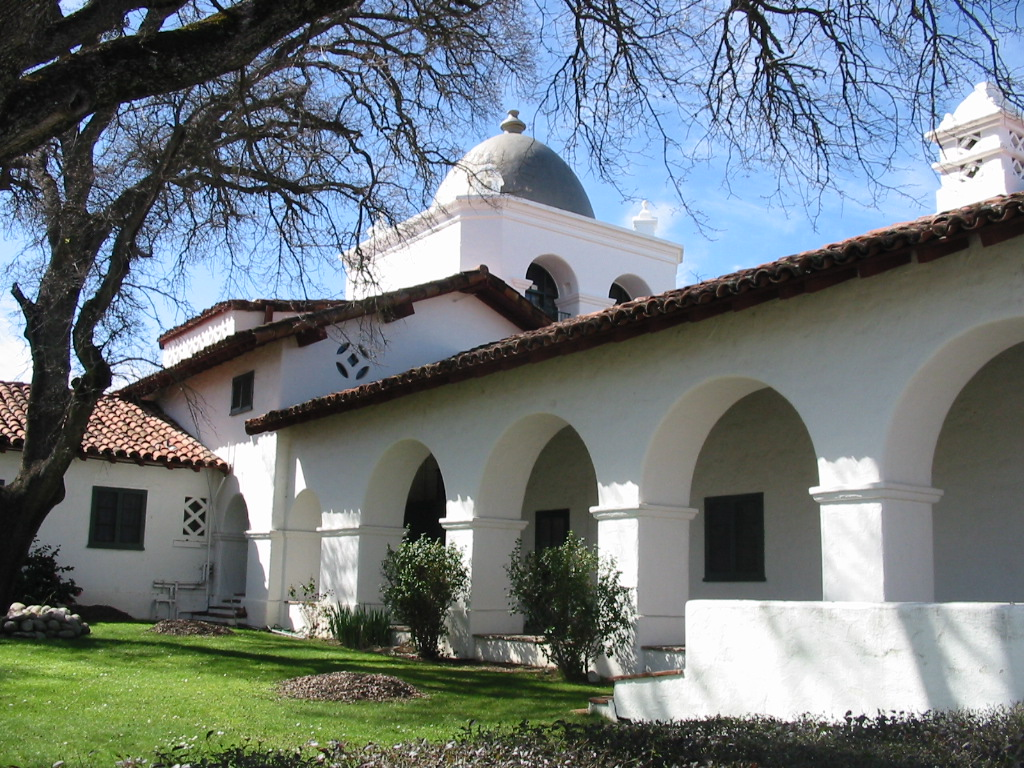
- The northwest tower is a pointed Moorish dome

- Location within California
- Nearest city: Jolon, California
- Built: 1930
- Architect: Julia Morgan
- Architectural style: Mission Revival, Moorish Revival, Spanish Colonial Revival
- NRHP reference No.: 77000310
- Added to NRHP: December 2, 1977

The Hacienda is the current designation for an historic hotel in Monterey County, near the town of Jolon, California. It was completed in 1930 for use by William Randolph Hearst as temporary housing for his employees and guests and headquarters for activities taking place on the surrounding land. The lodge building, designed by architect Julia Morgan, replaced and expanded upon an earlier wooden structure known as the Milpitas Ranch House which was destroyed by fire in the 1920s. The 1930 hotel has also been known as Milpitas Hacienda, Hacienda Guest Lodge, Hearst Hacienda Lodge, and Milpitas Ranchhouse, under which name the property was placed in the National Register of Historic Places on December 2, 1977.

The lodge currently has guest rooms and a bar but no food services. It is located within an active US Army Reserve unit, and guests must have proof of lodge reservations and a Real ID or passport to pass through a staffed guard gate to reach the lodge.

Hearst sold the structure and its surrounding property to the United States Army in 1940 for use as a training facility. The land and buildings were established by the Army as Fort Hunter Liggett. Today, the Army owns the building and a concessionaire operates it as a public hotel within the military base.

== History ==
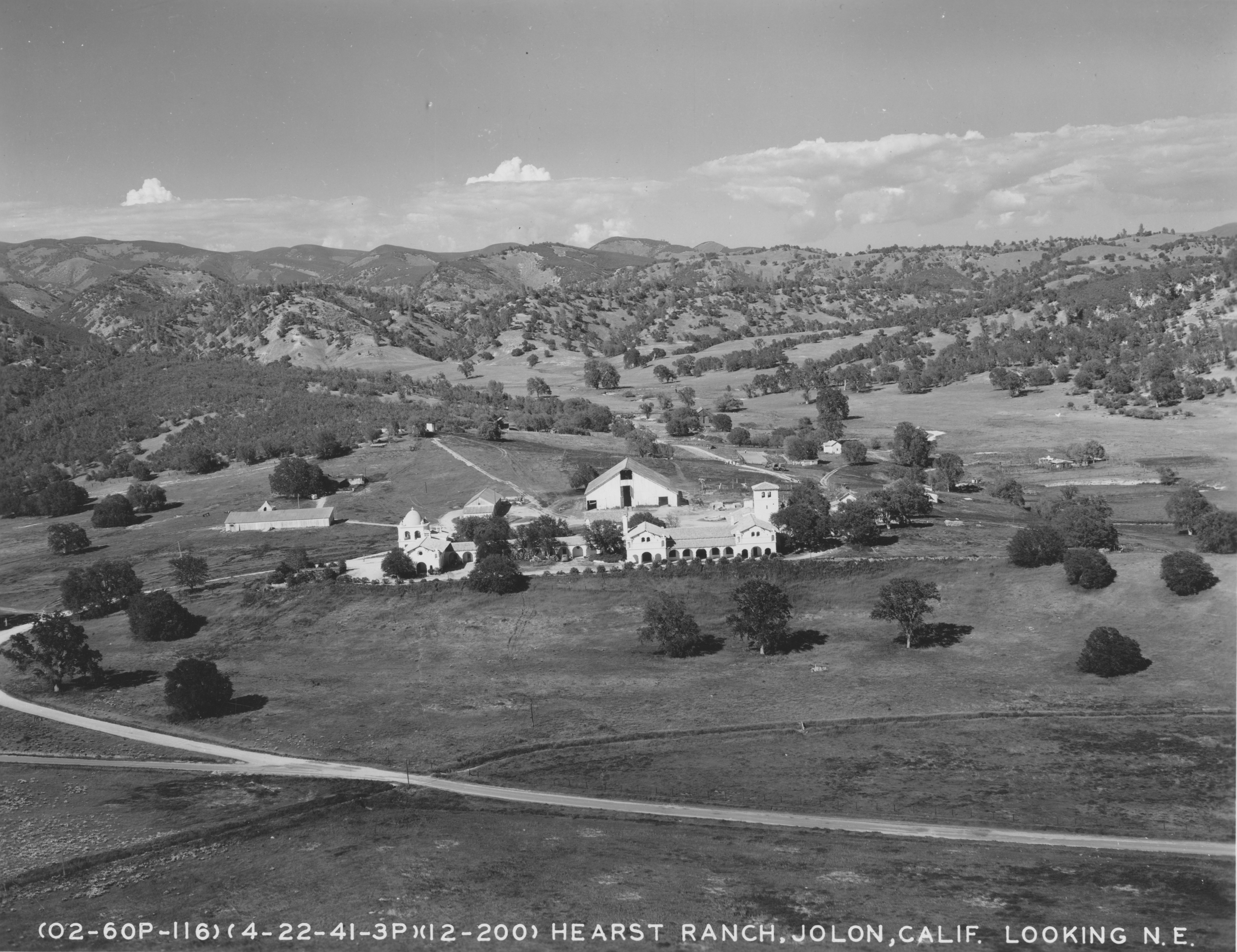
The hotel in 1941

The fertile valley surrounding The Hacienda was documented by Spanish explorer Gaspar de Portolà in 1769. Based on his recommendation, Father Junípero Serra established Mission San Antonio de Padua in the valley in 1771, and it thrived. Of all the California missions, San Antonio de Padua converted the highest number of Native Americans, peaking at 1,300 Salinan converts in 1805. In the 1830s, the mission was secularized and its holdings were divided into at least ten land grants (including Rancho Milpitas, or Little Corn Fields Ranch) given to soldiers and civilians supportive of Mexican government. English-speaking settlers began arriving in significant numbers in 1849 with the discovery of gold in California. Nearby Jolon was established as a gold mining town on an old Salinan village site in 1860, astride El Camino Real, the old road connecting all the Spanish missions in California.

=== Hearst ===
At the beginning of the 20th century, gold mining had petered out and Hearst began buying up property in the area. Over the next two decades, he amassed land holdings covering the entirety of four of the ten Mexican land grants and most of Jolon. On top of the old Rancho Milpitas main ranch house site, at the edge of a small hill and about half a mile from and overlooking the old mission, Hearst hired Morgan to build a new ranch headquarters. Construction on the Mission Revival-styled building complex began in 1929, using poured concrete instead of adobe. A smoothly domed north tower was built in Moorish Revival style above the main living quarters. Original plans for the building were for it to include housing for 20 employees but this was expanded to 30 during construction. A proposed southern wing for Hearst's private quarters was never completed. Materials were carried from Santa Cruz in a Fageol truck. Construction costs totaled $200,000.

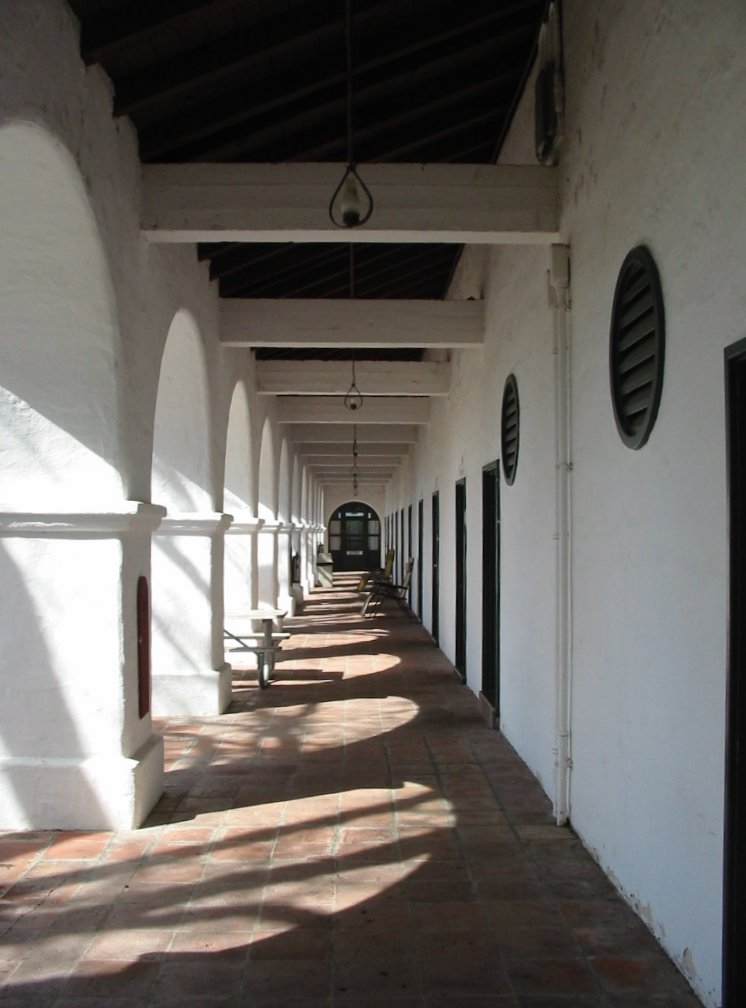
The rear corridor along the west side echoes similar ones at Mission San Antonio de Padua which is less than a mile away

The building was not originally supplied with electricity. Wires for a single telephone line were run from Hearst Castle 30 miles (48 km) away. Wood stoves and fireplaces supplied heat, candles and lanterns provided light, and a well near the San Antonio River fed a cistern positioned a short distance uphill to the east to supply water pressure for a modern plumbing system. Those staying at The Hacienda year-round included the ranch manager, mechanics, gardeners, cooks and a ranch foreman who supervised cowboys tending cattle and farmhands harvesting wheat, barley, oats and alfalfa.

Hearst's guests could drive in, fly in and land at an adjacent landing strip, or they could arrive by horseback after a full day's ride from San Simeon. Guests included Spencer Tracy, Dick Powell, Will Rogers, Clark Gable, Herbert Hoover, Jean Harlow, Leslie Howard and Errol Flynn. Hearst's paramour, Marion Davies, stayed in one of the four tower suites when she visited. Californio-style fiestas were thrown in the guests' honor, complete with mariachis playing from the dining room balcony.

Although hunting in the area was enjoyed by sportsmen both before and after Hearst's ownership, Hearst did not allow any hunting on his property, and the California State Military Museum has concluded that The Hacienda was not built as a hunting lodge. Other observers have described the building as Hearst's hunting lodge.

=== Army ===
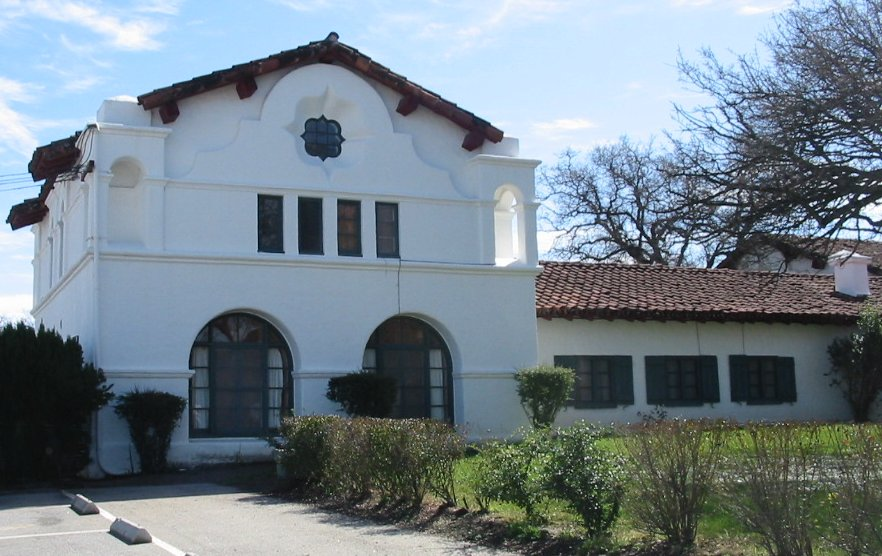
The southeast tower blends Mission-style elements with 20th-century windows and construction techniques

On December 12, 1940, Hearst sold 158,000 acres (63,940 ha), including the old Milpitas Ranch, to the United States government. Neighboring landowners sold another 108,950 acres (44,091 ha) to form a 266,950-acre (108,031 ha) training base for the War Department. The US Army used The Hacienda as housing for the base commander, for visiting officers and for the officers' club.

In 1957, a serviceman named Bill Runyan painted heroic murals depicting Spanish settlement of the area on selected interior walls of The Hacienda. Runyan started the large murals when he was a soldier at the fort but stayed on as a civil service carpenter to complete the task. Smaller ornamental paintings in the hotel date from the Hearst decade and were touched up or repainted by the Army.

=== National Park Service study ===
In November 1999, Congress authorized a study of Fort Hunter Liggett partly in response to a 1995 recommendation made by a Base Realignment and Closure (BRAC) commission which listed certain structures within the base as excess to the Army's needs. In 2004, the National Park Service (NPS) released an environmental assessment draft which identified for further study the Julia Morgan-designed Milpitas Hacienda complex including the swimming pool, tennis court and outbuildings as well as a number of other historic structures on the base and in the area. The NPS wrote that inclusion of the Milpitas Hacienda in the national park system would offer an opportunity to enhance visitor experience and expand their understanding of the lives and work of Morgan and Hearst. The NPS described the Milpitas Hacienda as representing the themes "expressing cultural values" and "developing the American economy" for its connection to Hearst and his media empire. Two alternatives were put forward: one where no action would be taken, and one where title to the Milpitas Hacienda and nearby bungalows would be transferred to California State Parks to be managed as an addition to the Hearst San Simeon State Historical Monument.

The US Army sent NPS a letter on May 27, 2005, stating that the BRAC property was no longer excess to the Army and was now required in order to support the Army's mission. This reversal in status for The Hacienda caused the NPS to re-evaluate its study of title transfer and management options, and to cease environmental assessment. On September 19, 2006, NPS submitted to Congress its final report which concluded that a number of national resources in and around Fort Hunter Liggett including the Milpitas Hacienda complex were suitable for inclusion in the national park system but that such an action was not currently feasible because none of the land or buildings were excess to the Army's needs. The NPS encouraged the Army "to continue its protection and management of the natural and cultural resources in a manner that retains their national significance."

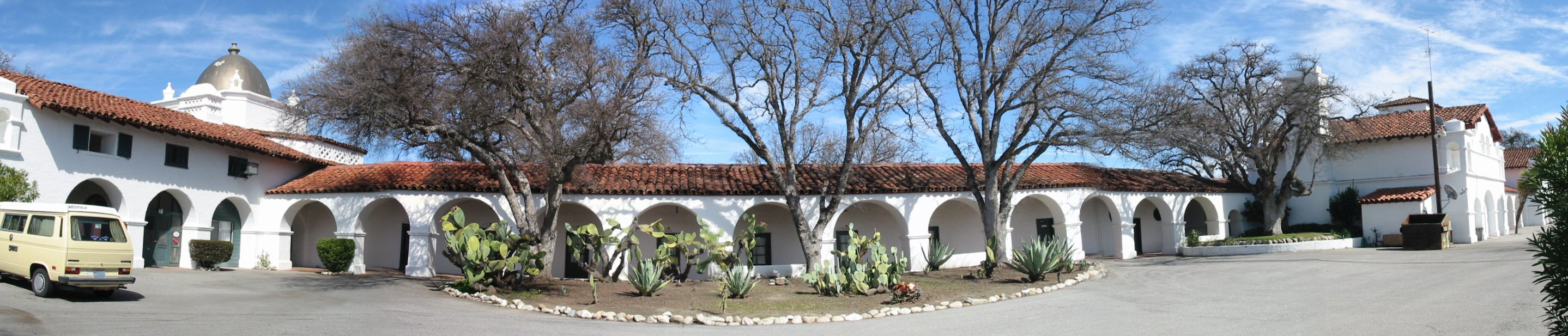
Panoramic view of the west (rear) face of The Hacienda

Today, the United States Army Reserve operates the base, and a civilian concessionaire is allowed to run The Hacienda as a hotel open both to the public and to the military. Visitor access to the base, the hotel and the old Spanish mission is monitored through an Army checkpoint.

== See also ==
- List of works by Julia Morgan
- National Register of Historic Places listings in Monterey County, California
