= USNS Mission San Antonio =

History

United States
- Laid down: 15 January 1944
- Launched: 8 April 1944
- Acquired: 22 October 1947
- In service: 22 October 1947
- Out of service: 11 January 1965
- Stricken: 11 January 1965
- Identification: IMO number: 6519716
- Fate: Sold for scrap, 26 October 1983

General characteristics
- Displacement: 21,880 tons full; 5,532 tons light
- Length: 524 ft (160 m)
- Beam: 68 ft (21 m)
- Draft: 30 ft (9 m)
- Propulsion: Turbo-electric, single screw, 6,000 hp (4.5 MW)
- Speed: 16.5 knots (31 km/h)
- Complement: 52 mariners

SS Mission San Antonio was a Type T2-SE-A2 tanker built for the United States Maritime Commission during World War II. After the war she was acquired by the United States Navy as USS Mission San Antonio (AO-119). Later the tanker transferred to the Military Sea Transportation Service as USNS Mission San Antonio (T-AO-119). She was a Mission Buenaventura-class oiler and was named for Mission San Antonio de Padua located near Jolon, California.

== Career ==
Mission San Antonio was laid down on 15 January 1944 under a United States Maritime Commission contract by Marinship Ship Corporation, Sausalito, California; launched 8 April 1944; sponsored by Mrs. Marian McClure; and delivered 24 May 1944. Chartered to Los Angeles Tanker Operators Inc., on her delivery date for operations, she spent the remainder of the War carrying vital fuel products to Allied forces in the western Pacific (during which time she was awarded the National Defense Service Medal). She was returned to the Maritime Commission on 30 April 1946 and laid up in the Maritime Reserve Fleet at Mobile, Alabama.

Acquired by the Navy on 22 October 1947 she was placed in service with the Naval Transportation Service as Mission San Antonio (AO-119). After 1 October 1949 she was under the operational control of the new Military Sea Transportation Service as USNS Mission San Antonio (T-AO-119). She served with MSTS until 22 November 1954 when she was returned to the Maritime Administration (MARAD) and laid up in the National Defense Reserve Fleet at James River, Virginia. Reacquired by the Navy on 6 July 1956 she was placed in service with MSTS until 16 December 1959 when she was returned to the Maritime Administration and laid up in the Maritime Reserve Fleet at Beaumont, Texas.

Her stay in the Reserve Fleet was short, for on 9 June 1960 Mission San Antonio was reacquired by the Navy and placed in service with MSTS on the same date. She served faithfully until 11 January 1965 when she was once again returned to MARAD and laid up in the Maritime Reserve Fleet at James River. Struck from the Naval Vessel Register on the same date, she was sold to Transwestern Associates on 9 June 1965 for conversion to a bulk carrier. She was renamed SS Transartic, but was reacquired by MARAD on 27 August 1965. She was resold to Hudson Waterways Corporation on 24 January 1966 for conversion into a container ship by Savannah Machine and Foundry and renamed Seatrain San Juan, IMO 6519716, in September 1966. Upon completion of the conversion in 1967 she began hauling containerized cargo for Seatrain Lines between the east and west coasts of the United States and to Puerto Rico.

The ship was sold on 30 June 1972, to Tyler Tanker Corp. She was returned to MARAD on 20 November 1973, and was laid up in the National Defense Reserve Fleet, James River Group, Fort Eustis, Virginia. On 8 August 1978 the ship was renamed SS San Juan. The ship was sold for scrapping on 26 October 1983, to Isaac Manuel Varela Davillo, Spain.
