= Pleyto, California =

Pleyto
- Unincorporated community
- Location in California
- Coordinates: 35°51′37″N 120°59′37″W
- Country: United States
- State: California
- County: Monterey County
- Elevation: 781 ft (238 m)

Pleyto (Spanish for "Plea") is an unincorporated community in Monterey County, California. It is located on the San Antonio River 12.5 miles (20 km) southeast of Jolon, at an elevation of 781 feet (238 m).

The town was founded by William Pinkerton in 1868, and named for the Rancho Pleyto Mexican land grant. The Pleito post office operated from 1870 to 1872 and from 1874 to 1876. In 1884, the name was changed from "Pleito" to "Pleyto". The Pleyto post office operated from 1884 to 1925. The town's original site has been flooded by Lake San Antonio.
