= Jolon, California =

Unincorporated community in California, United States

Jolon
- Unincorporated community
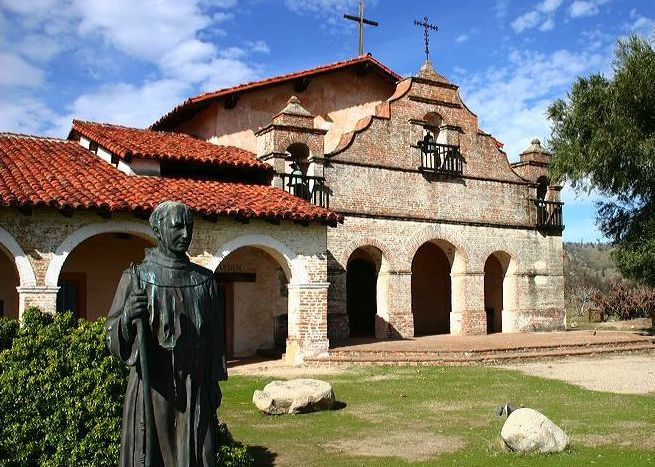
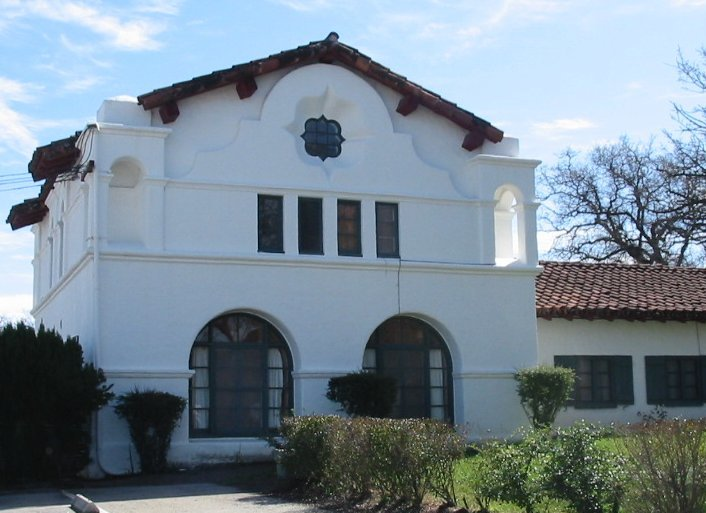
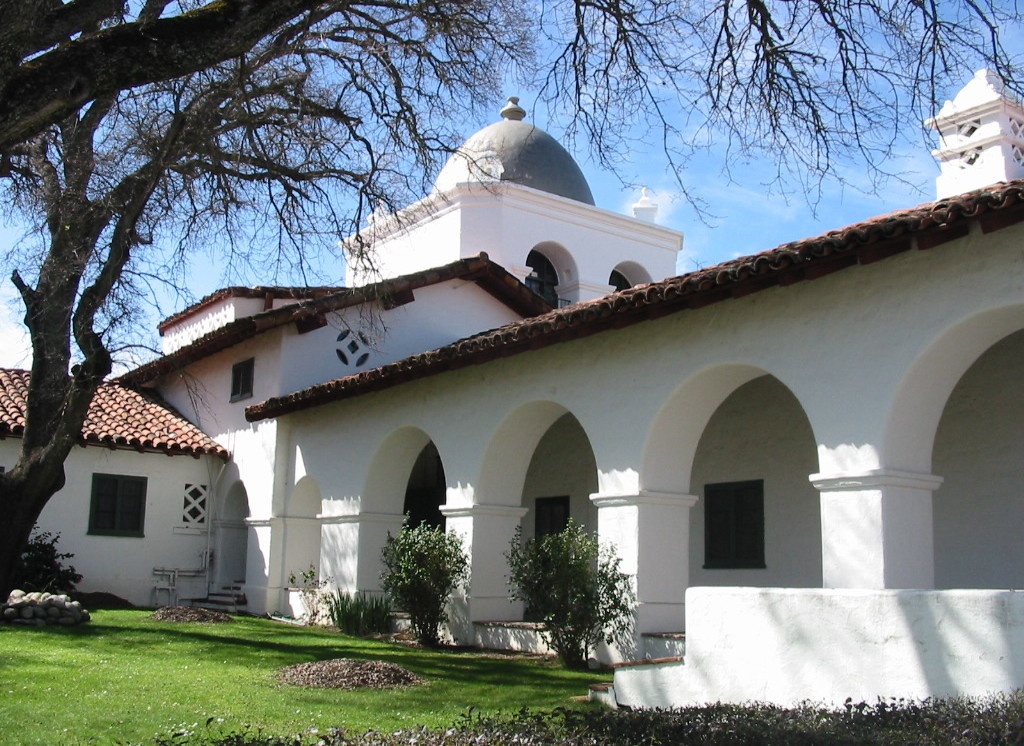
- Top: Mission San Antonio de Padua; Bottom: Hacienda Milpitas

- Location in California
- Coordinates: 35°58′15″N 121°10′34″W
- Country: United States
- State: California
- County: Monterey
- Elevation: 971 ft (296 m)

Jolon (/hoʊˈloʊn/; Spanish: Jolón; Salinan: Xolon) is a small unincorporated village in southern Monterey County, California, United States. Jolon is located in the San Antonio River Valley, west of Salinas Valley and is entirely surrounded by Fort Hunter Liggett.

The origins of Jolon date to 1771, when the Spanish established Mission San Antonio de Padua, under the command of Saint Junípero Serra. The town was officially founded by Californios in 1849, when Antonio Ramírez built an inn as a stop on El Camino Real.

== Etymology ==
The name Xolon means "valley of dead trees" in the Salinan language.

== History ==
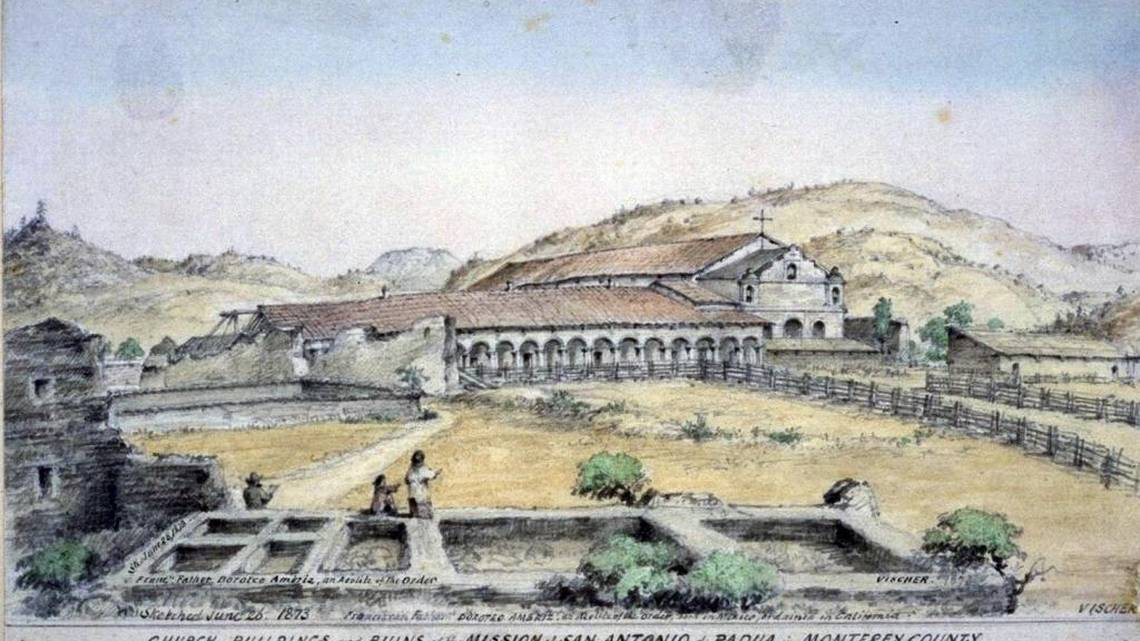
The Spanish founded Mission San Antonio de Padua in 1771, under the command of Saint Junípero Serra.

Before European contact, the Salinan people lived in the region.

=== Spanish period ===
The Spanish Portolá expedition, led by Gaspar de Portolá, camped on the San Antonio River near modern-day Jolon on September 24, 1769, having crossed the Santa Lucia Range from the coast. The party continued north through Jolon Valley.

Mission San Antonio de Padua was established two years later in 1771, under the direction of Junípero Serra, head of the mission system in California.

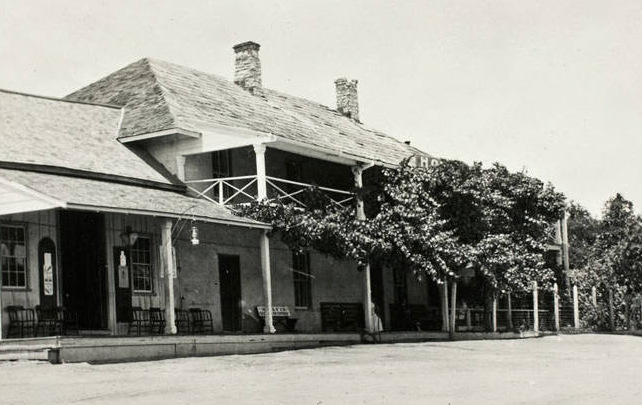
The Dutton Hotel in 1890. It was originally built in 1849 by Antonio Ramírez, the founder of Jolon.

When the mission lands were secularized, the lands of the Mission San Antonio de Padua were by law intended to be granted to the indigenous people. In practice, that rarely occurred. The mission lands were divided into several land grants in the Jolon area:

- Rancho Milpitas — (Little Gardens)
- Rancho San Miguelito — (Little St. Michael)
- Rancho El Piojo — (The Louse)
- Rancho Posa de los Ositos — (Pool of the Little Bears)
- Rancho San Miguelito de Trinidad —
- Rancho Los Ojitos

=== Mexican period ===
The Mexican secularization act of 1833 was devastating to Mission San Antonio de Padua, reducing its population from 1,300 in 1805 to under 150 in 1834. Following the mass exodus of Mission Indians from the mission, the small community was practically deserted, making Mission San Antonio de Padua the only mission not to grow into a town during the Spanish or Mexican periods.

In 1845, Governor Pío Pico declared all mission buildings in Alta California for sale, but no one bid for Mission San Antonio.

=== American period ===
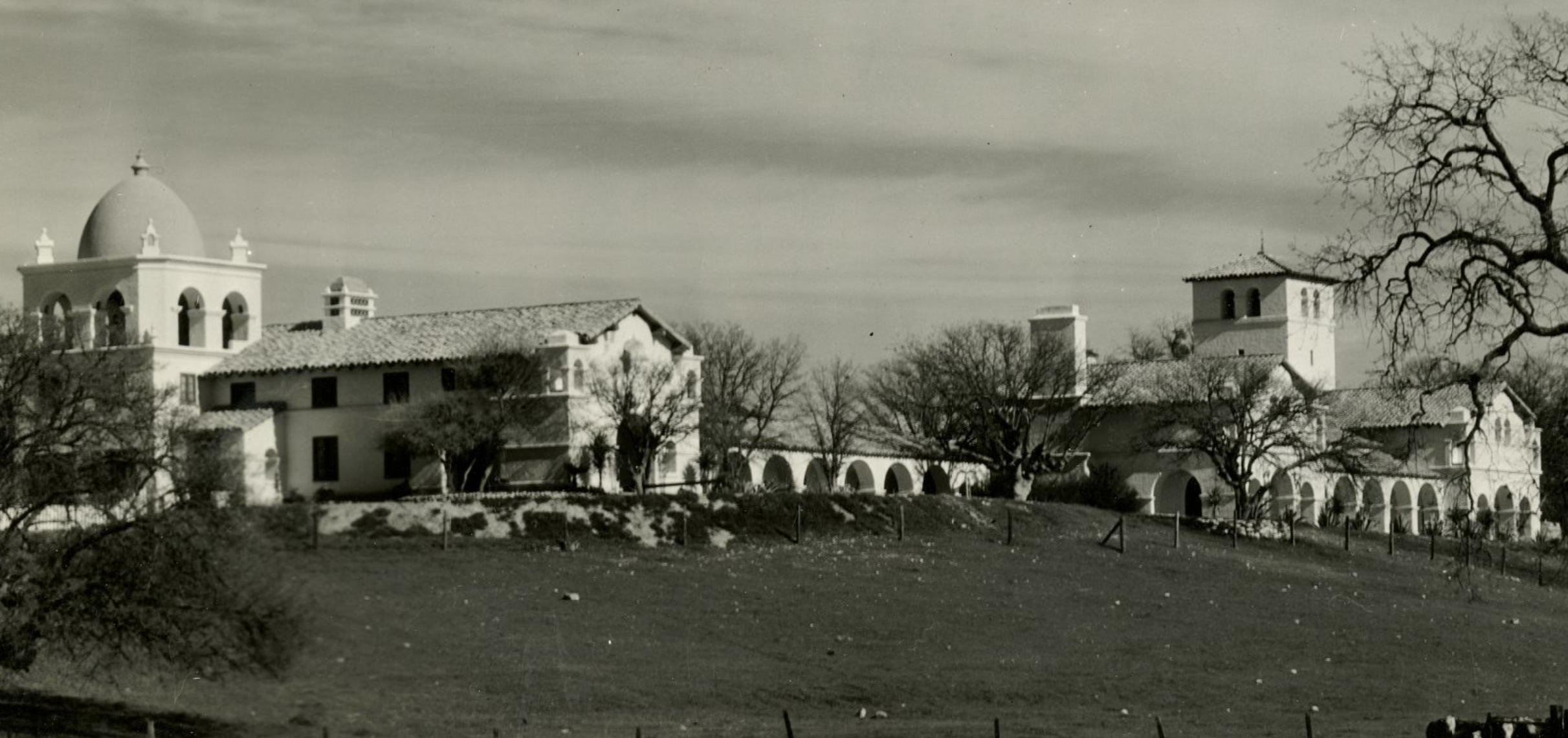
Hacienda Milpitas was built in 1930 as a country estate for William Randolph Hearst and designed by famed architect Julia Morgan.

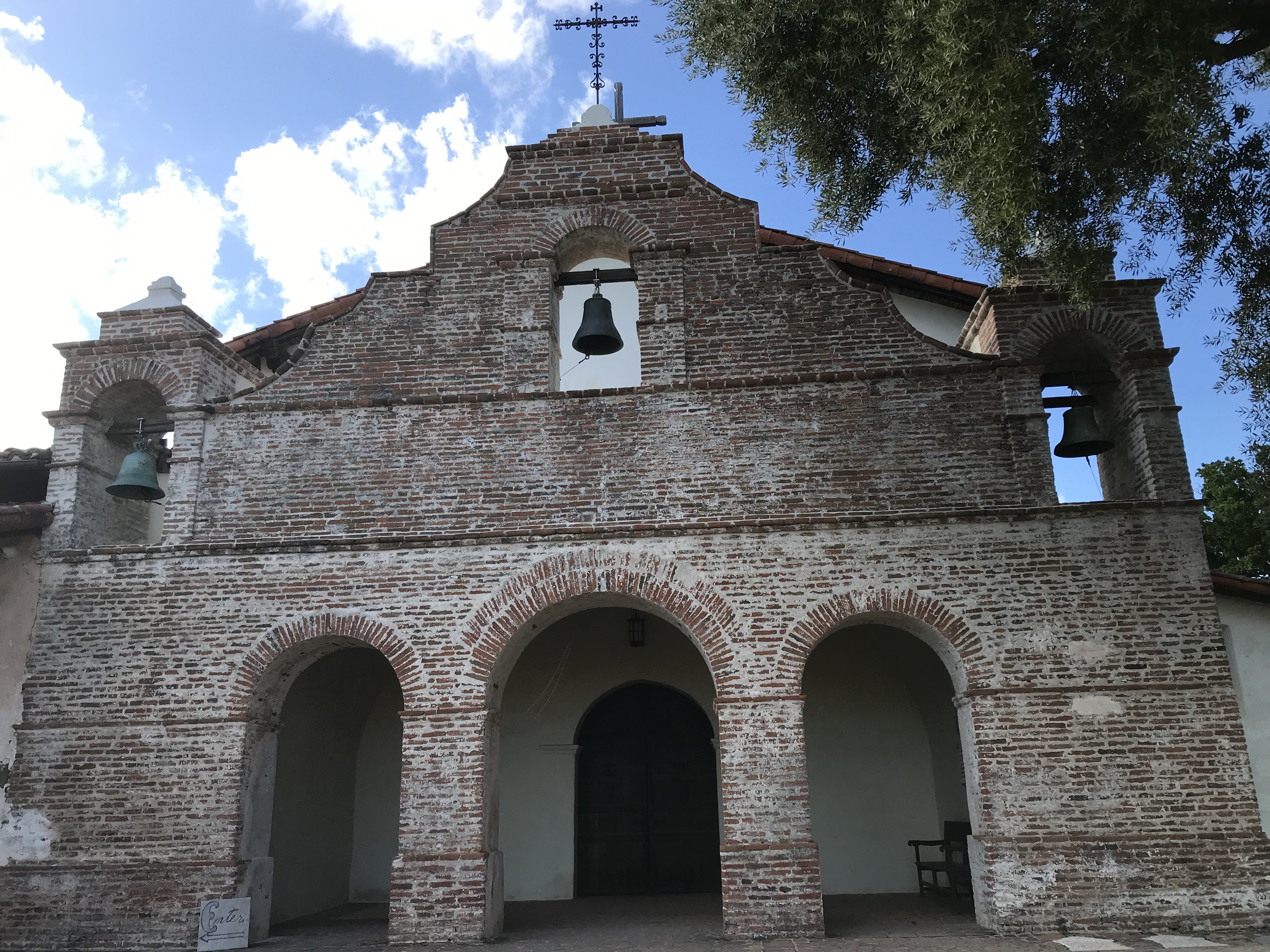
Mission San Antonio in 2020

The town was founded by Antonio Ramírez, who built an inn at the place in 1850. The Jolon post office was founded in 1872. The inn later became a major Stagecoach Station on the route for travelers between San Francisco and Los Angeles.

The hotel changed owners several times before 1876, when H.C. Dodge sold it to Lt. George Hough Dutton (1825–1905) for $1,000 and 100 acres. Dutton added a second adobe story, wood-frame structures at either end, called the Dutton Hotel, listed on the National Register of Historic Places on October 14, 1971. In 1890, Captain Thomas Theodore Tidball, a friend of Dutton, established the Tidball Store, also listed on the National Register of Historic Places.

In the early 1920s William Randolph Hearst bought up thousands of acres in the rolling foothills of the Santa Lucia mountains east of Hearst Castle near San Simeon on California's Central Coast. He sent his architect, Julia Morgan, to the eastern side of the range, near Mission San Antonio, to design and oversee the building of a hacienda-style headquarters for the expansion of his ranching operation. The building was called the Hacienda Milpitas Ranchhouse, or simply the Hacienda.

Hearst sold his rancho to the U.S. Army in 1940. In preparation for World War II, the army established Fort Hunter Liggett as an important training center for the West Coast, still in operation today.

== Geography ==
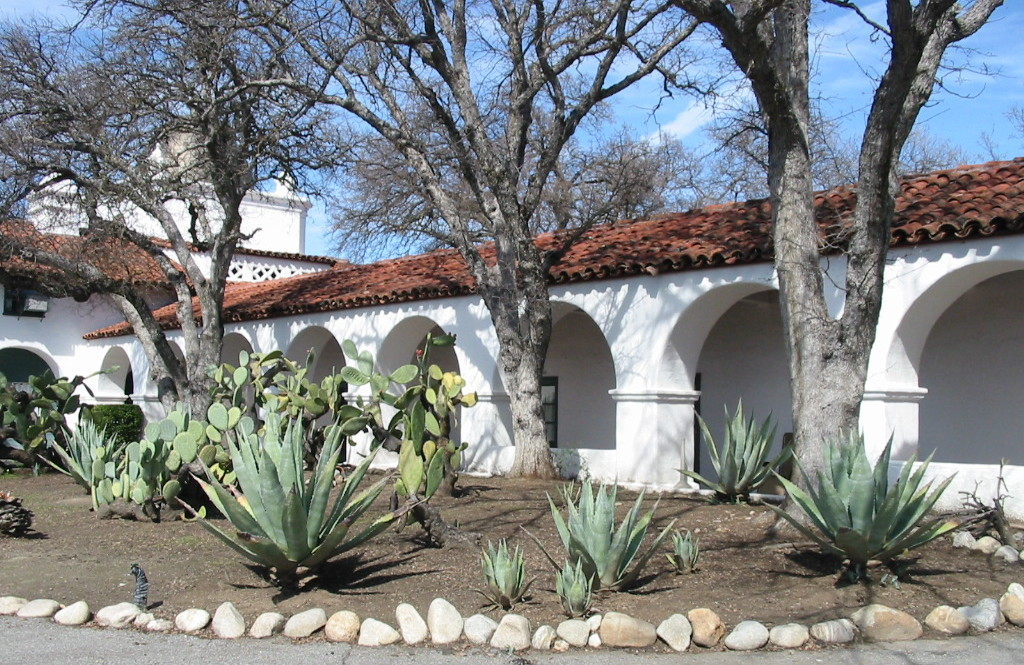
The Hacienda Hotel, located inside of Fort Hunter Liggett

Jolon is located in the San Antonio River Valley of southern Monterey County, inland on the Central Coast of California.

=== Climate ===
This region experiences warm (but not hot) and dry summers, with no average monthly temperatures above 74.4 °F. According to the Köppen Climate Classification system, Jolon has a warm-summer Mediterranean climate, abbreviated "Csb" on climate maps.

Climate data for Jolon
Month	Jan	Feb	Mar	Apr	May	Jun	Jul	Aug	Sep	Oct	Nov	Dec	Year
Mean daily maximum °F (°C)	63.2 (17.3)	66.2 (19.0)	68.9 (20.5)	74.8 (23.8)	78.4 (25.8)	83.0 (28.3)	85.1 (29.5)	85.2 (29.6)	85.0 (29.4)	79.9 (26.6)	69.4 (20.8)	63.2 (17.3)	75.2 (24.0)
Daily mean °F (°C)	50.2 (10.1)	53.3 (11.8)	55.5 (13.1)	59.0 (15.0)	62.7 (17.1)	66.6 (19.2)	69.0 (20.6)	68.1 (20.1)	68.8 (20.4)	63.2 (17.3)	54.8 (12.7)	49.7 (9.8)	60.1 (15.6)
Mean daily minimum °F (°C)	37.2 (2.9)	40.3 (4.6)	42.1 (5.6)	43.1 (6.2)	46.9 (8.3)	50.2 (10.1)	52.9 (11.6)	53.1 (11.7)	51.2 (10.7)	46.5 (8.1)	40.1 (4.5)	36.1 (2.3)	45.0 (7.2)
Average rainfall inches (mm)	2.35 (60)	2.65 (67)	2.49 (63)	0.74 (19)	0.24 (6.1)	0.07 (1.8)	0.01 (0.25)	0.05 (1.3)	0.25 (6.4)	0.55 (14)	1.23 (31)	1.67 (42)	12.30 (312)
Mean daily sunshine hours	10.5	11.4	12.4	13.6	14.6	15.1	14.8	13.9	12.8	11.7	10.7	10.2	12.6
Source 1: Weather For You
Source 2: Weatherbase
