= Mission San Antonio de Padua =

18th-century Spanish mission in California

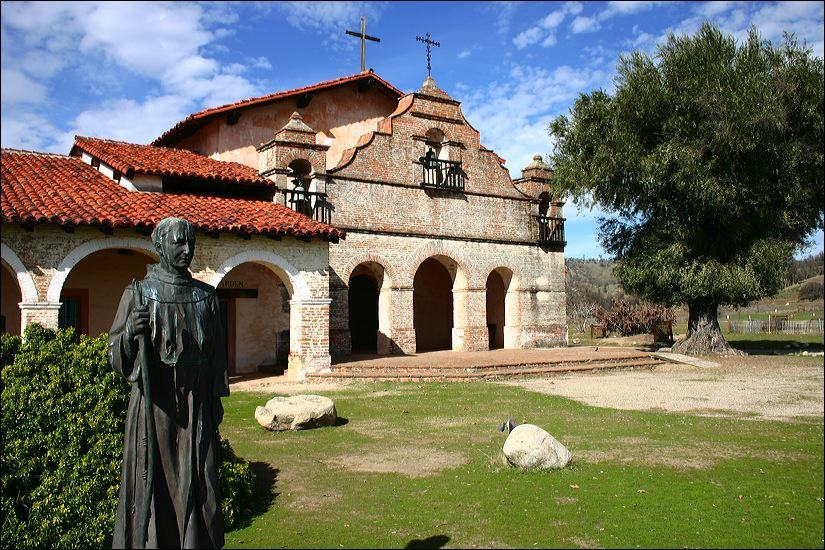
- The reconstructed Mission San Antonio de Padua as it appeared in 2006; construction on the Mission first began in 1810. The baked brick Campanario is unique among California Missions.

- Location within California Location within the United States
- Location: near Jolon, Monterey County, California
- Coordinates: 36°00′54″N 121°15′00″W
- Name as founded: La Misión de San Antonio de Padua
- English translation: The Mission of Saint Anthony of Padua
- Patron: Saint Anthony of Padua
- Nickname: "Mission of the Sierras"
- Founded: July 14, 1771
- Founded by: Father Junípero Serra
- Founding Order: Third
- Military district: Third
- Native tribe(s) Spanish name(s): Salinan
- Native place name: Telhaya
- Baptisms: 4,419
- Marriages: 1,142
- Burials: 3,617
- Secularized: 1834
- Returned to the Church: 1862
- Governing body: Roman Catholic Diocese of Monterey
- Current use: Parish Church

U.S. National Register of Historic Places
- Designated: 1976
- Reference no.: 76000504

California Historical Landmark
- Reference no.: 232

Website
- http://www.missionsanantonio.net

Mission San Antonio de Padua is a Spanish mission established by the Franciscan order in present-day Monterey County, California, near the present-day town of Jolon. Founded on July 14, 1771, it was the third mission founded in Alta California by Father Presidente Junípero Serra. The mission was the first use of fired tile roofing in Upper California. Today the mission is a parish church of the Diocese of Monterey and is no longer active in the mission work which it was set up to provide.

== History ==
=== Beginnings of the Mission ===
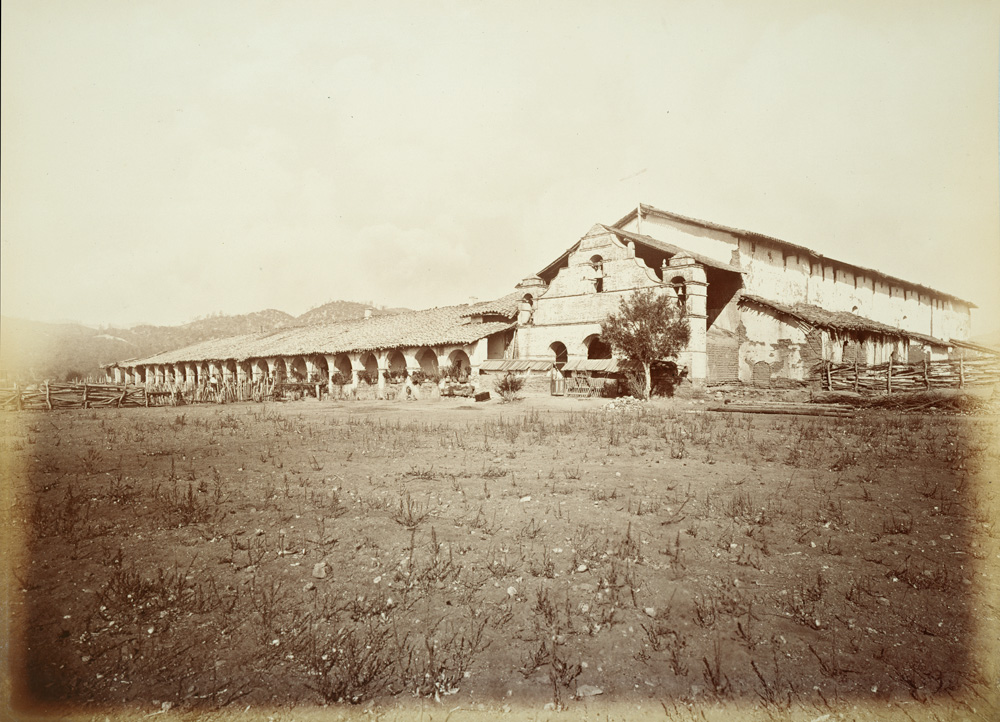
Photograph of Mission San Antonio de Padua by landscape photographer Carleton Watkins, dating from 1873 to 1883.

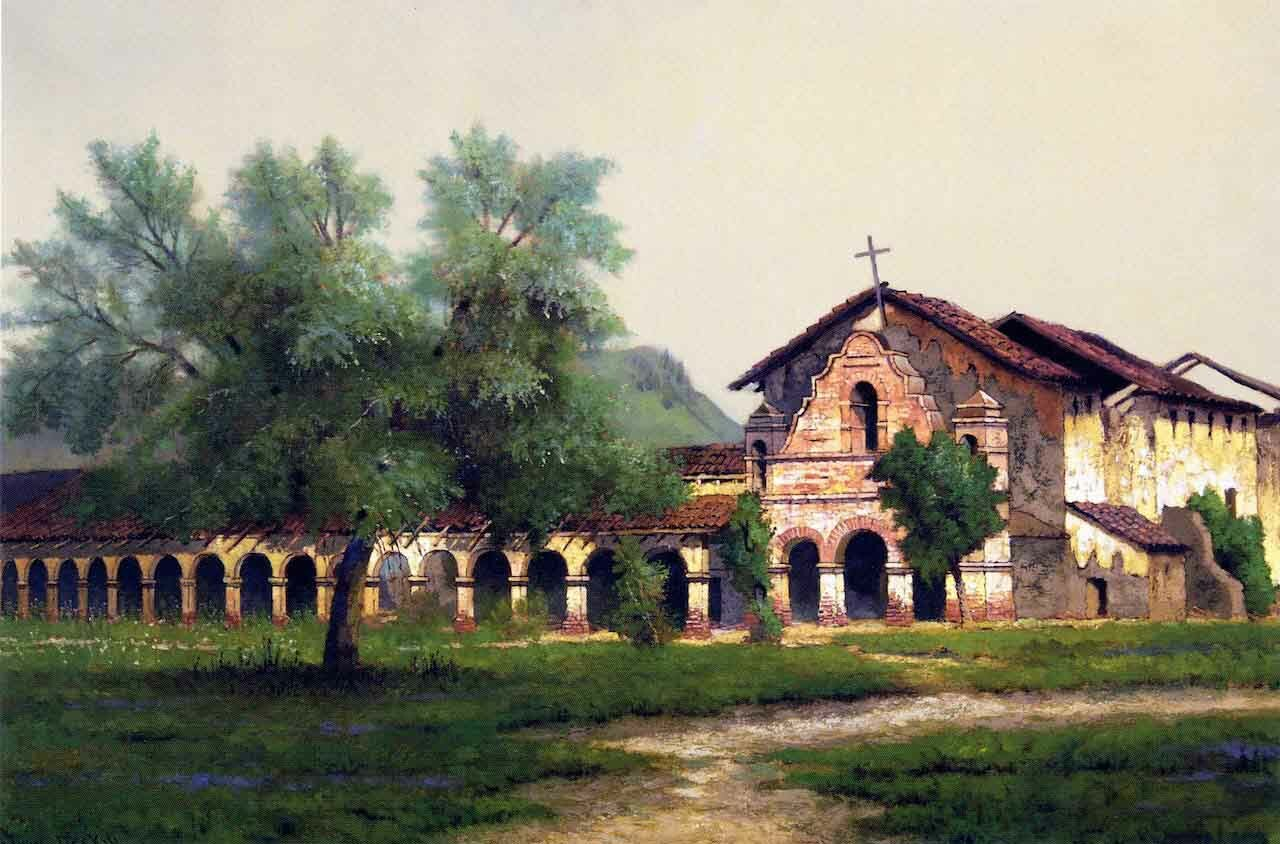
Mission San Antonio de Padua painting by Edwin Deakin, 1899

Mission San Antonio de Padua was the third Mission to be founded in Alta California, and was located along the very earliest routing of the Camino Real. This mission was located on a site which was unfortunately somewhat remote from the more reliable water source of what later became known as the Salinas River. In that very early year of the missions, the later more favorable routing of the Camino Real, more closely aligning with the course of the Salinas River, had not yet been discovered or established.

Father Junipero Serra claimed the site on July 14, 1771, and dedicated the Mission to Saint Anthony of Padua. Saint Anthony was born in 1195 in Lisbon, Portugal and is the patron saint of the poor. Father Serra left Fathers Miguel Pieras and Buenaventura Sitjar behind to continue the building efforts, though the construction of the church proper did not actually begin until 1810.

From 1804-1830 the missionary Juan Bautista Sancho studied the local languages and composed music.

In 1805, the native people at the mission, mostly Northern Salinan (Antoniano) but also some Yokuts and Esselen, had increased to 1,300. By 1810, only 178 Native Americans were living at the Mission, In 1834, after secularization there were 150 Mission Indians remaining. No town grew up around the mission, as was usual at other missions.

In 1845, Mexican Governor Pío Pico declared all mission buildings in Alta California for sale, but no one bid for Mission San Antonio. In 1863, after nearly 30 years, the Mission was returned to the Catholic Church. In 1894, roof tiles were salvaged from the property and installed on the Southern Pacific Railroad depot located in Burlingame, California, one of the first permanent structures constructed in the Mission Revival Style.

=== Restoration ===
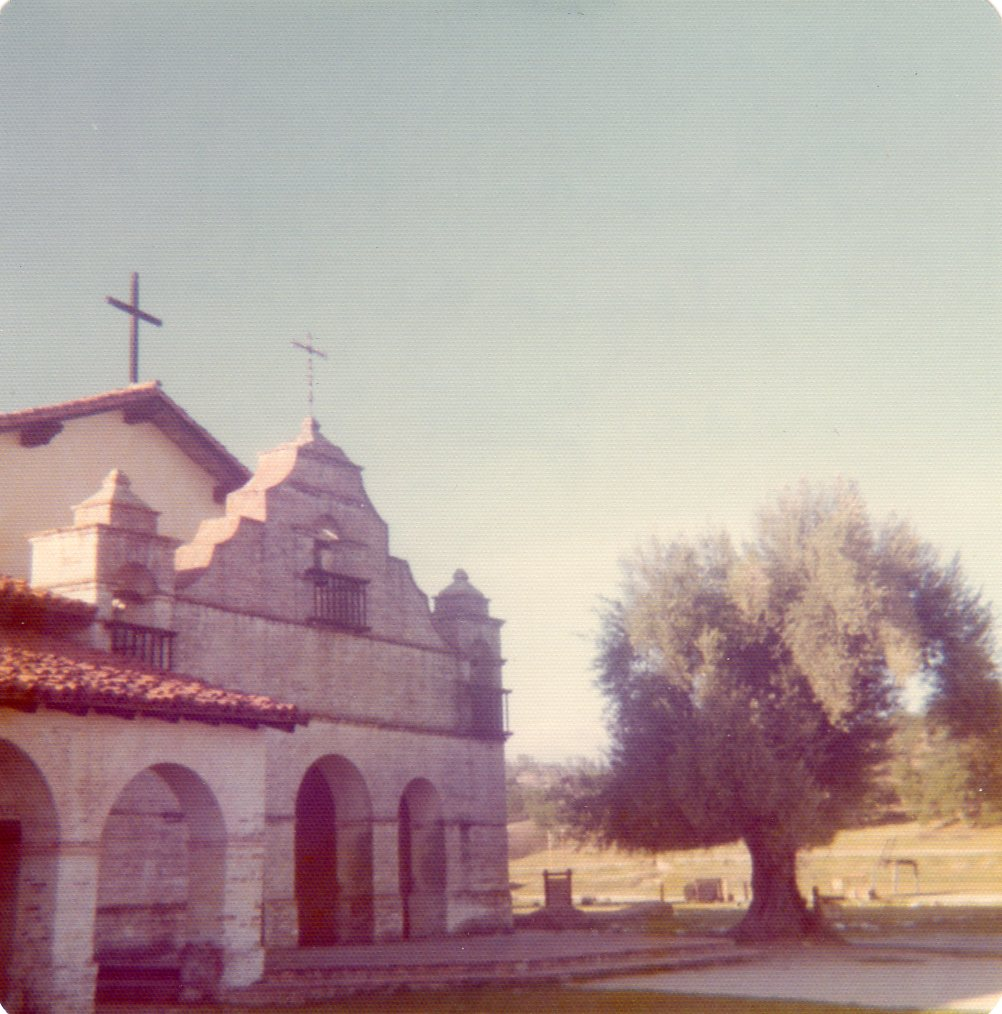
1970s view of the mission

The first attempt to rebuild the Mission came in 1903 when Andrew Garriga, the pastor of the King City and Gonzales parish, and the California Historical Landmarks League began holding outings at San Antonio. "Preservation and restoration of Mission San Antonio began. The Native Sons of the Golden West donated $1,400. Tons of debris were removed from the interior of the chapel.the mission was restored 2 times. Breaches in the side wall were filled in." Unfortunately, the earthquake of 1906 seriously damaged the building. In 1928, Franciscan friars held services at San Antonio de Padua. It took nearly 50 years to completely restore the Mission. The State of California is requiring a $12–15 million earthquake retrofit that must be completed by 2015, or the mission will be closed. As of 2011, there were 35 private families keeping the mission open. There is an active campaign to raise funds for the retrofit.

=== Current use of the old San Antonio Mission ===
Despite its being still referred to as a mission, the Mission San Antonio de Padua is no longer active in Catholic missions and has become more focused as a parish church, fundraiser location, and tourist attraction. In 2005, the Franciscan Friars turned over the mission's caretaking and ownership to the Diocese of Monterey. Under the leadership of the Diocese of Monterey, Mission San Antonio de Padua transformed into a Catholic parish which also hosts group gatherings, gift shops and a museum with picnic grounds.

== Present day ==
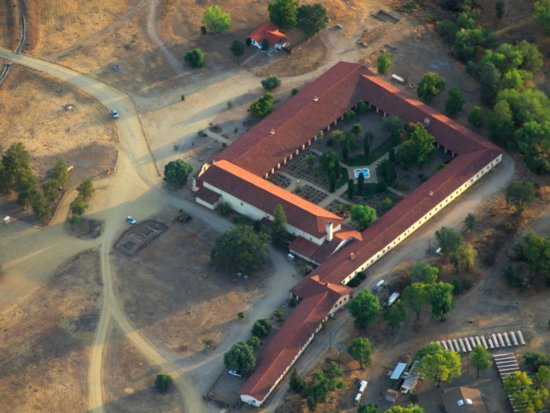
Aerial view of San Antonio de Padua from October 2013

Today, the nearest city is King City, nearly 29 miles (47 kilometers) away; Jolon, a small town, is located six miles (10 km) from the Mission. Historians consider the Mission's pastoral location in the valley of the San Antonio River along the Santa Lucia Mountains as an outstanding example of early mission life.

The mission is surrounded by the Fort Hunter Liggett Military Reservation, which was acquired by the U.S. Army from the Hearst family during World War II to train troops. Additional land was acquired from the Army in 1950 to increase the mission area to over 85 acres (34 hectares). This fort is still actively training troops today.

Mission San Antonio de Padua is one of the designated tour sights of the Juan Bautista de Anza National Historic Trail.

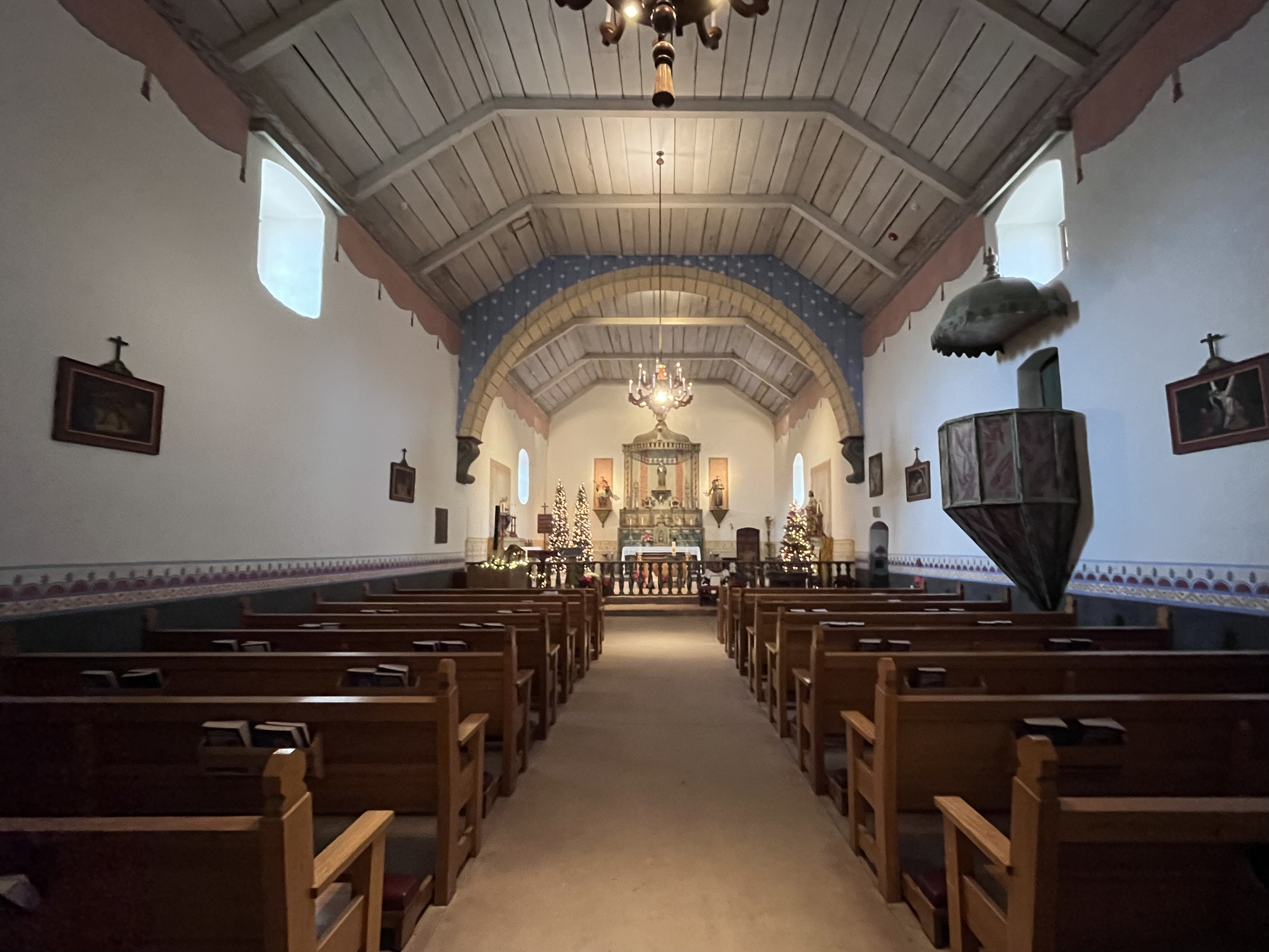
Inside of Mission San Antonio de Padua church, facing altar

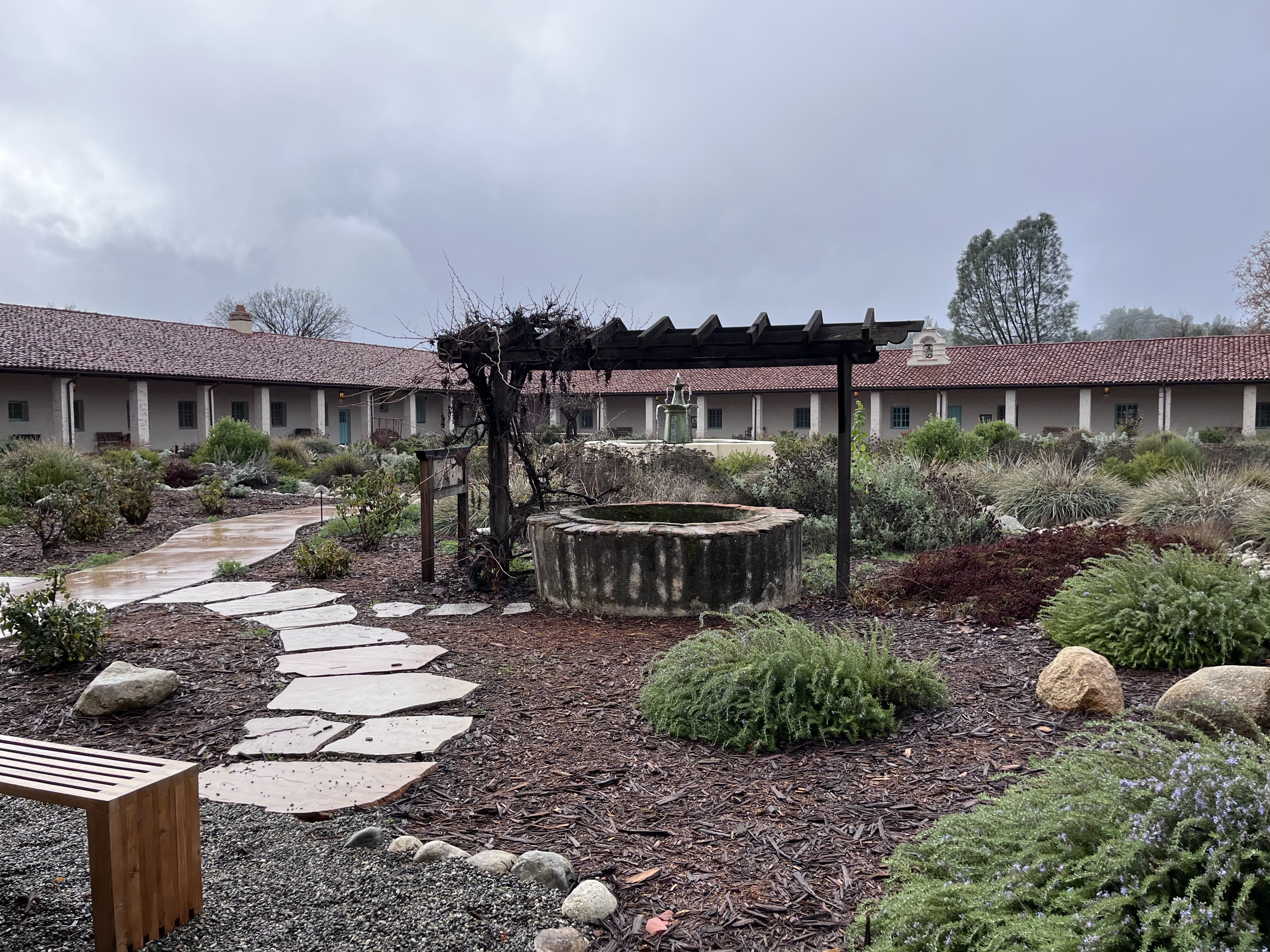
Mission Courtyard, as of December 2023

As of 2013, Franciscan Friar Jeff Burns OFM, is in charge of the Mission.

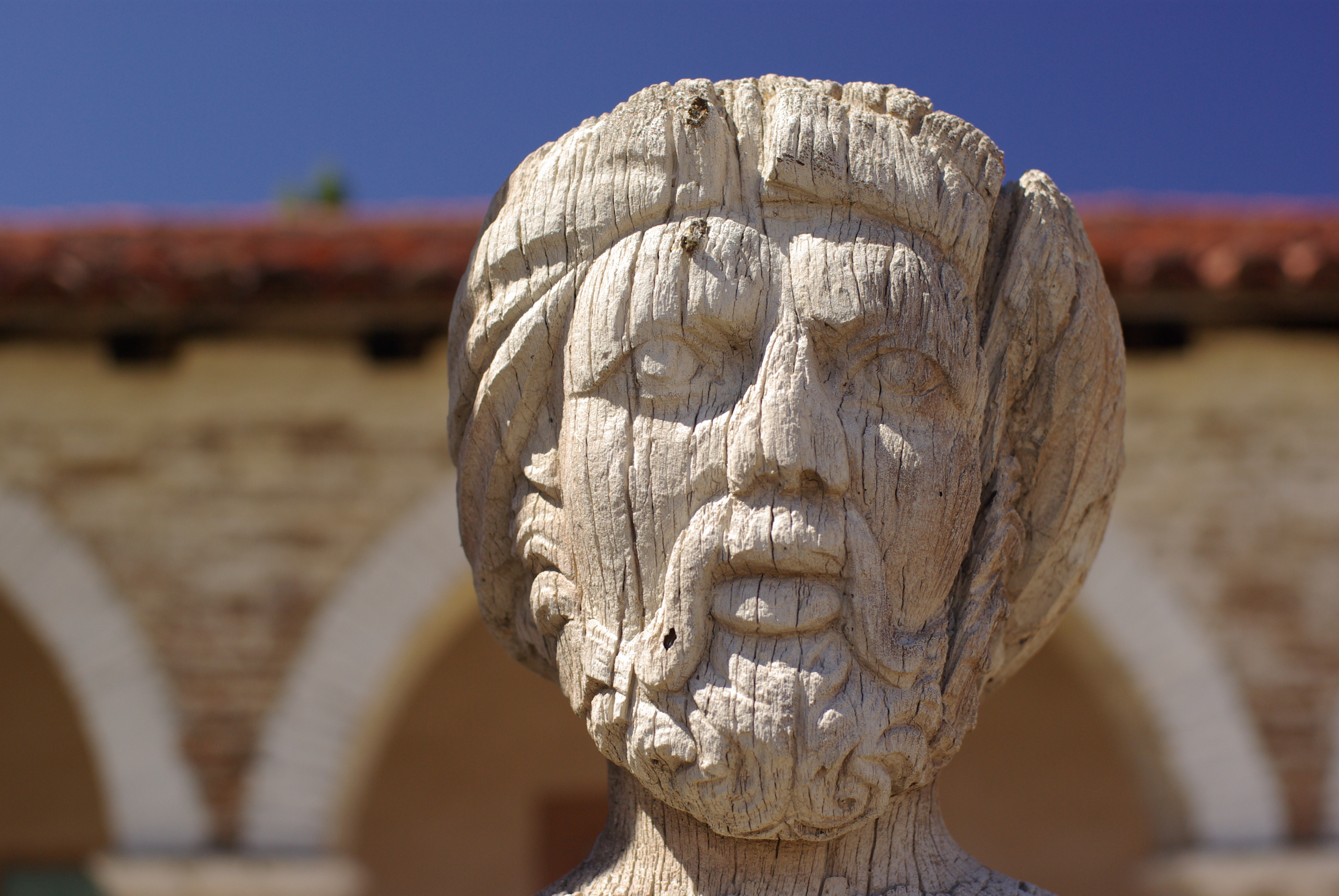
Wooden ship sculpture excavated at Mission San Antonio de Padua

== In popular culture ==
- The 1965 horror film Incubus was partly filmed at the Mission. The writer and director, Leslie Stevens, concerned that the Mission authorities would not allow the film to be shot there because of the subject matter, concocted a cover story that the film was called Religious Leaders of Old Monterey, and presented a script that was about monks and farmers. He was helped in this deception by the fact that the film was shot entirely in Esperanto.
- The Mission was featured by Huell Howser in Road Trip Episode 147

== See also ==
- The Hacienda (Milpitas Ranchhouse) – the nearby Mission Revival Style guest-ranch house [now hotel] built in 1930 by W.R. Hearst.
- Juan Bautista de Anza National Historic Trail
- List of Spanish missions in California
- List of tourist attractions in Monterey County, California
- Mission Nuestra Señora de la Soledad – next mission located north
- Mission San Miguel Arcángel – next mission located south
- Spanish missions in California
- USNS Mission San Antonio (T-AO-119), a Buenaventura-Class fleet oiler built in 1944
