= Dutton Hotel, Stagecoach Station =

Historic building in Jolon, California

- U.S. National Register of Historic Places
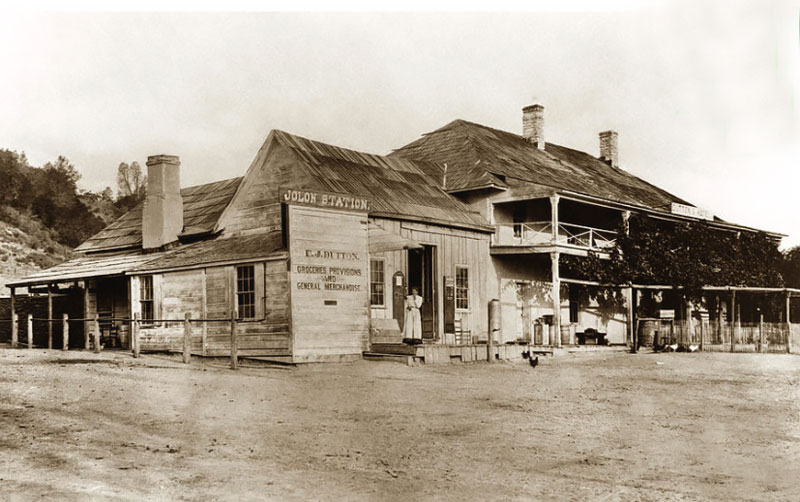
- Dutton Hotel, ca. 1903, Stagecoach Station in Jolon Road, Jolon, California

- Location within California Location within the United States
- Location: Jolon
- Coordinates: 35°58′29″N 121°10′33″W
- Area: 100 acres (40 ha)
- Built: 1849
- Architectural style: Monterey Colonial
- NRHP reference No.: 71000166
- Added to NRHP: October 14, 1971

Dutton Hotel, Stagecoach Station is located on Jolon Road in Jolon, California. What remains are ruins of an adobe inn that was established in 1849. The Dutton Hotel was a major stagecoach stop on El Camino Real in the late 1880s. The landmark was listed on the National Register of Historic Places on October 14, 1971.

== History ==
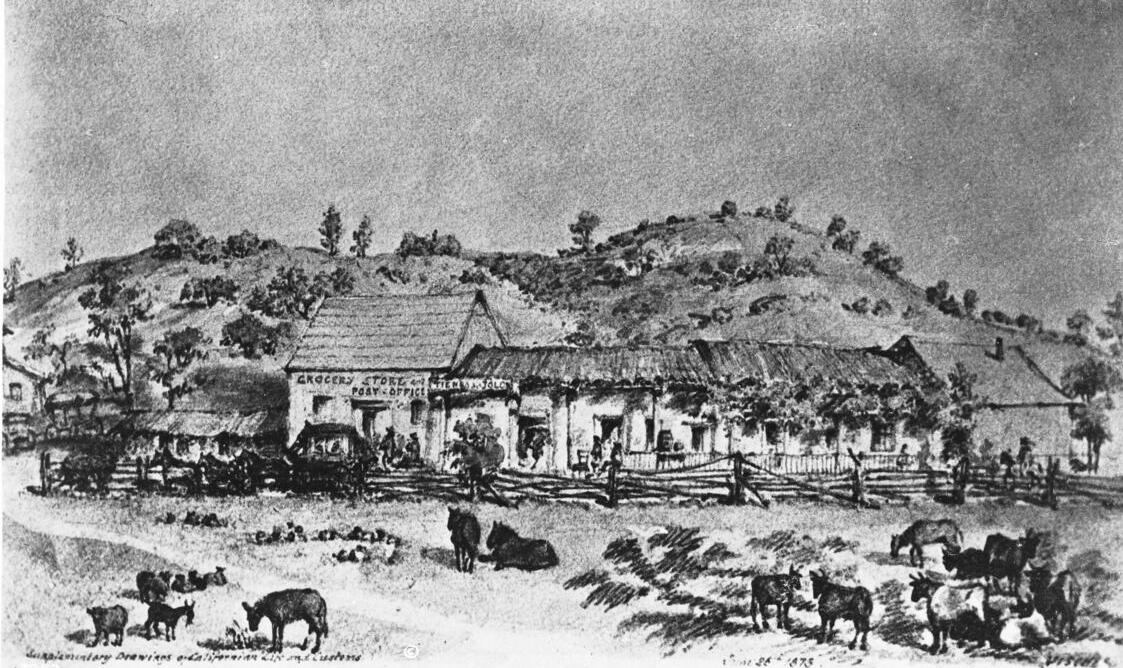
Drawing by Edward Vischer depicting the Jolon stagecoach station, June 26, 1875. Henry C. Dodge, Proprietor.

The first floor had two dining rooms, one for guests and the other for ranch hands and servants; two parlors and rooms for the owner. The second story had rooms for guests on both sides.

The General Store was next to the hotel and was called "Jolon Station", which was the chief supplier of foodstuffs, clothing, building supplies and whatever people needed. It had a saloon in the rear of the building with a fireplace, an ornate bar and six poker tables. Miners from the Los Burros Mining District in the Santa Lucia Mountains and families who lived in Pacific Valley and other coastal areas would visit the hotel twice a year to enjoy the hospitality of the Duttons for a few days and gather supplies for their mines and ranches. The first post office in Jolon was located at the general store.

Although the hotel operated from 1850 until 1929, its heyday was from 1875 until 1910. In 1910, when US-101 was rerouted to bypass Jolon by nearly twenty miles, the town became a ghost town within a few years. Dutton's son, Edwin Julian Dutton (1870-1921), took over management of the hotel when he was 21. He died in 1921. In 1929, the hotel was sold to William Randolph Hearst by the Dutton's widow, to become part of Fort Hunter Liggett. George Dutton and other members of his family are buried at the Jolon Cemetery. Hearst removed the surrounding buildings and his hope was to restore the adobe in the old mission style and turn it into a museum, but it never materialized.

In 1940, the United States Army acquired the property and the adobe was used as a recreation center and temporary camp. From 1950 to 1960, the building began to deteriorate. On August 16, 1969, the Monterey County surveyors and engineers surveyed the historic site. The roof had caved in the walls looked like they would not last the winter. On October 14, 1971, the Dutton Hotel was listed on the National Register of Historic Places.

Today, visitors can still see what remains of the adobe hotel. A kiosk and sign stands in front of the remaining adobe bricks and protective structure that are in decay.

== Gallery ==
Hotel front is covered by single old grape vine

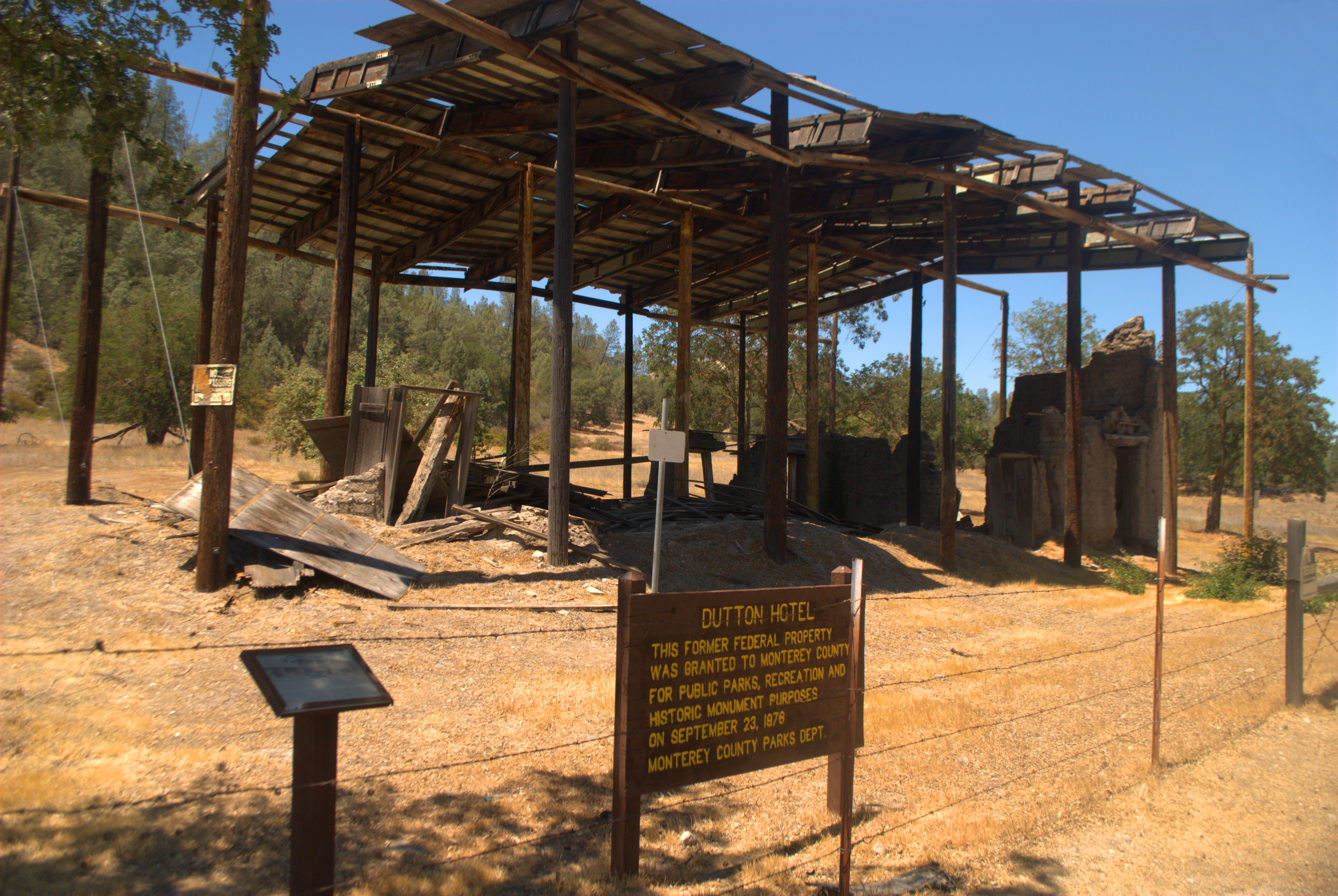
Dutton Hotel Site

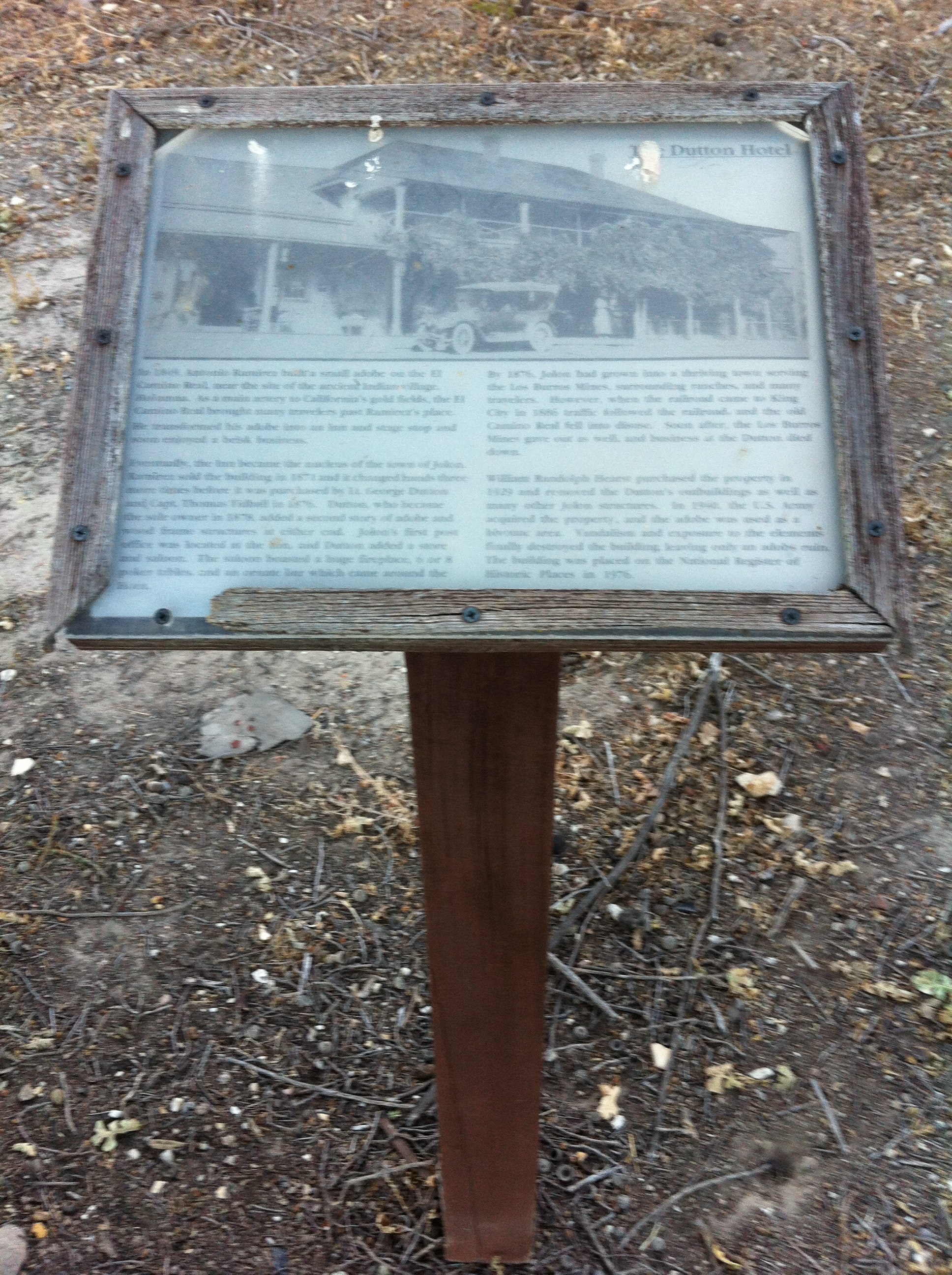
Dutton hotel kiosk

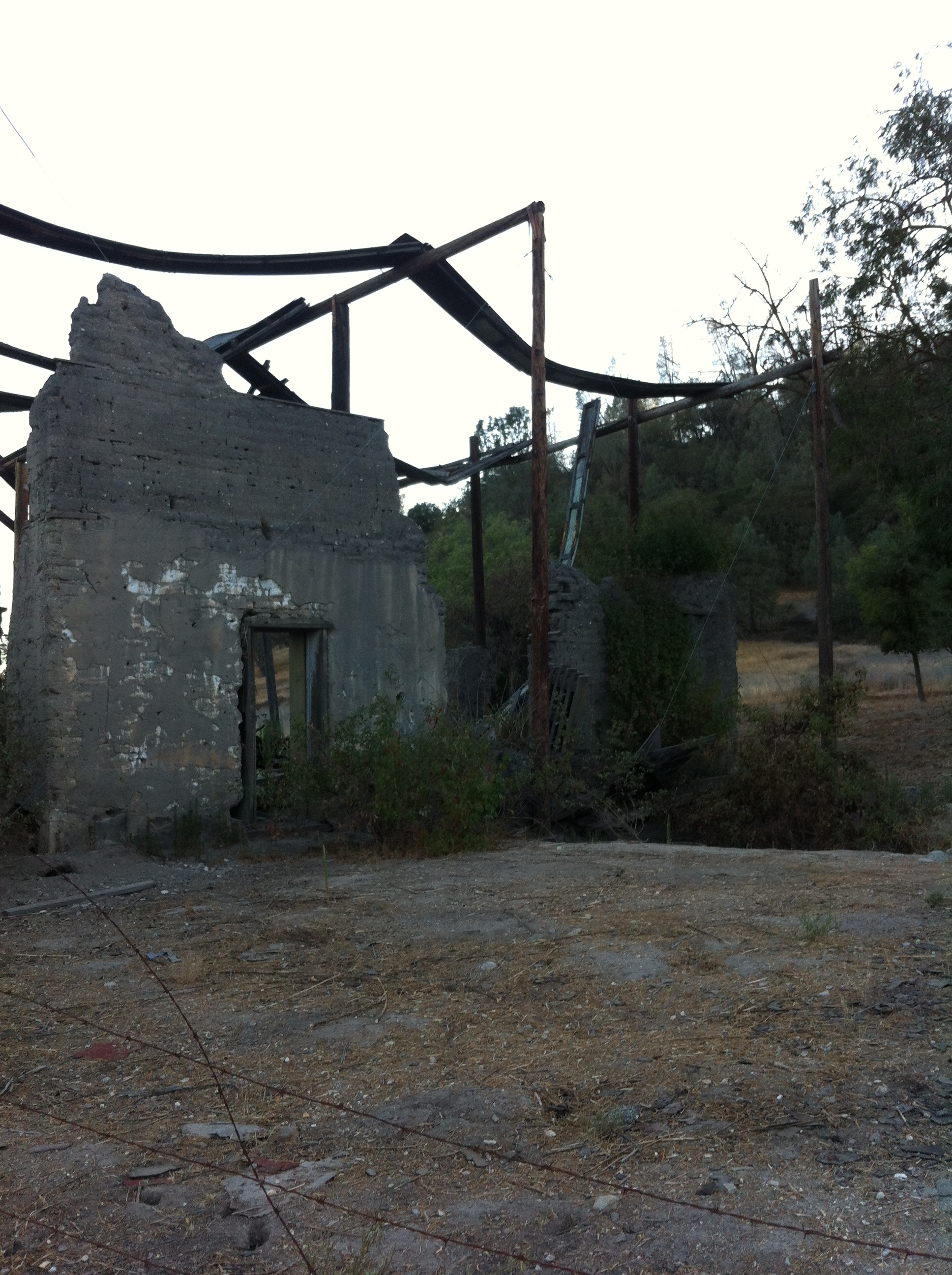
Dutton hotel Adobe

== See also ==
- National Register of Historic Places listings in Monterey County, California
