= Rancho San Miguelito de Trinidad =

Mexican land grant in California

Coordinates: 35.950°N 121.260°W

Rancho San Miguelito de Trinidad was a 22,136-acre (89.58 km^{2}) Mexican land grant in present day southern Monterey County, California given in 1841 by Governor Juan B. Alvarado to José Rafael Gonzalez. The grant extended along the Nacimiento River and Stony Creek, west of Rancho Milpitas.

== History ==
With secularization, the lands of the Mission San Antonio de Padua were divided into at least ten Mexican land grants (including Rancho Milpitas (Little Fields), Rancho El Piojo (The Louse), Rancho Los Ojitos (Little Springs), and Rancho San Miguelito de Trinidad). The five square league Rancho San Miguelito de Trinidad was granted to Rafael Gonzales. Rafael Gonzales' son, Mauricio Gonzales, was the grantee of Rancho Cholame.

With the cession of California to the United States following the Mexican-American War, the 1848 Treaty of Guadalupe Hidalgo provided that the land grants would be honored. As required by the Land Act of 1851, a claim for Rancho San Miguelito de Trinidad was filed with the Public Land Commission in 1852, and the grant was patented to José Rafael Gonzalez in 1867.

The droughts of 1863 and 1864 killed more than 5,000 head of cattle on the rancho. Charles B. Polhemus bought Rancho San Miguelito de Trinidad in 1869, and sold it in 1872 to his business partner, Henry Mayo Newhall. Along with Rancho El Piojo, it became part of the Newhall Land and Farming Company. In 1923, Newhall Land sold Rancho San Miguelito de Trinidad and Rancho El Piojo to William Randolph Hearst. In 1940, in preparation for involvement in World War II, the U.S. War Department purchased the land to create a troop training facility known as the Hunter Liggett Military Reservation.

== See also ==
- Ranchos of California
- List of Ranchos of California
