= Rancho El Piojo =

Mexican land grant in California

Coordinates: 35.900°N 121.190°W

Rancho El Piojo was a 13,329-acre (53.94 km^{2}) Mexican land grant in present day Monterey County, California given in 1842 by Governor Juan B. Alvarado to Joaquín Soto. The grant extended along Piojo Creek south of Rancho San Miguelito de Trinidad.

== History ==
With secularization, the lands of the Mission San Antonio de Padua were divided into at least ten Mexican land grants (including Rancho Milpitas (Little Fields), Rancho San Miguelito de Trinidad, Rancho Los Ojitos (Little Springs) and Rancho El Piojo (The Louse)). The three square league Rancho El Piojo was granted to Joaquín Soto.

With the cession of California to the United States following the Mexican-American War, the 1848 Treaty of Guadalupe Hidalgo provided that the land grants would be honored. As required by the Land Act of 1851, a claim for Rancho El Piojo was filed with the Public Land Commission in 1853, and the grant was patented to Joaquín Soto in 1866.

The rancho was bought at a foreclosure sale by Charles B. Polhemus, who sold it in 1871 to his business partner, Henry Mayo Newhall, and along with Rancho San Miguelito de Trinidad, it became part of the Newhall Land and Farming Company. In 1923, Newhall Land sold Rancho San Miguelito de Trinidad and Rancho El Piojo to William Randolph Hearst. In 1940, in preparation for involvement in World War II, the U.S. War Department purchased the land to create a troop training facility known as the Hunter Liggett Military Reservation.

== See also ==
- Ranchos of California
- List of Ranchos of California
