= Rancho Milpitas (Pastor) =

Mexican land grant in California

Coordinates: 36.010°N 121.243°W

Rancho Milpitas was a 43,281-acre (175.15 km^{2}) Mexican land grant in present-day Monterey County, California given in 1838 by governor Juan Alvarado to Ygnacio Pastor. The grant encompassed present day Jolon.

== History ==
With secularization, the lands of the Mission San Antonio de Padua were divided into at least ten Mexican land grants (including Rancho Milpitas (Little Fields), Rancho El Piojo (The Louse), Rancho San Miguelito de Trinidad, and Rancho Los Ojitos (Little Springs)). Ygnacio Pastor, a neophyte of the San Antonio Mission, received the grant of Rancho Milpitas from Governor Alvarado in 1838.

With the cession of California to the United States following the Mexican–American War, the 1848 Treaty of Guadalupe Hidalgo provided that the land grants would be honored. As required by the Land Act of 1851, a claim for Rancho Milpitas was filed with the Public Land Commission in 1853, and the grant was patented to Ygnacio Pastor in 1875. Faxon Atherton purchased Rancho Milpitas from Ygnacio Pastor immediately upon its title clearance in 1875. By 1880, the James Brown Cattle Company owned and operated Rancho Milpitas and Rancho Los Ojitos. William Randolph Hearst's Piedmont Land and Cattle Company acquired the rancho in 1925. In 1940, in preparation for involvement in World War II, the U.S. War Department purchased the land from Hearst to create a troop training facility known as the Hunter Liggett Military Reservation.

== Historic sites of the Rancho ==
- The Hacienda was completed in 1930 for use by William Randolph Hearst, and it is on the National Register of Historic Places.

== See also ==
- Ranchos of California
- List of Ranchos of California
