= Henry Newhall =

American businessman (1825–1882)

Henry Mayo Newhall
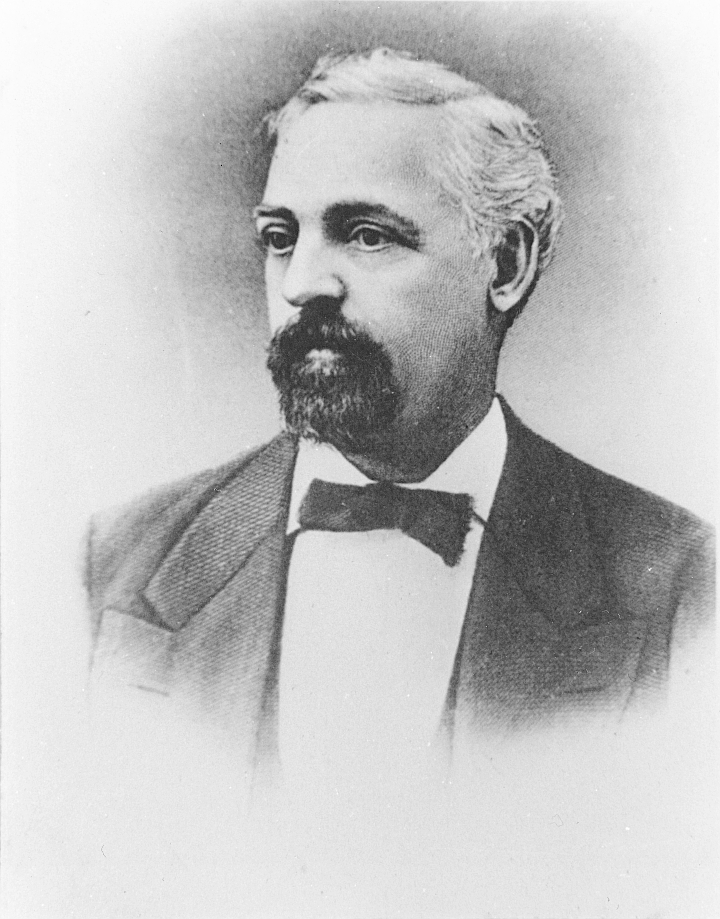
- Born: May 13, 1825; Saugus, Massachusetts, US
- Died: March 13, 1882 (aged 56); San Francisco, California, US
- Burial place: Cypress Lawn Memorial Park
- Occupation: Businessman

Henry Mayo Newhall (May 13, 1825 – March 13, 1882) was an American businessman whose extensive land holdings became the Southern California communities of Newhall, Saugus and Valencia, and the city of Santa Clarita.

== Life ==
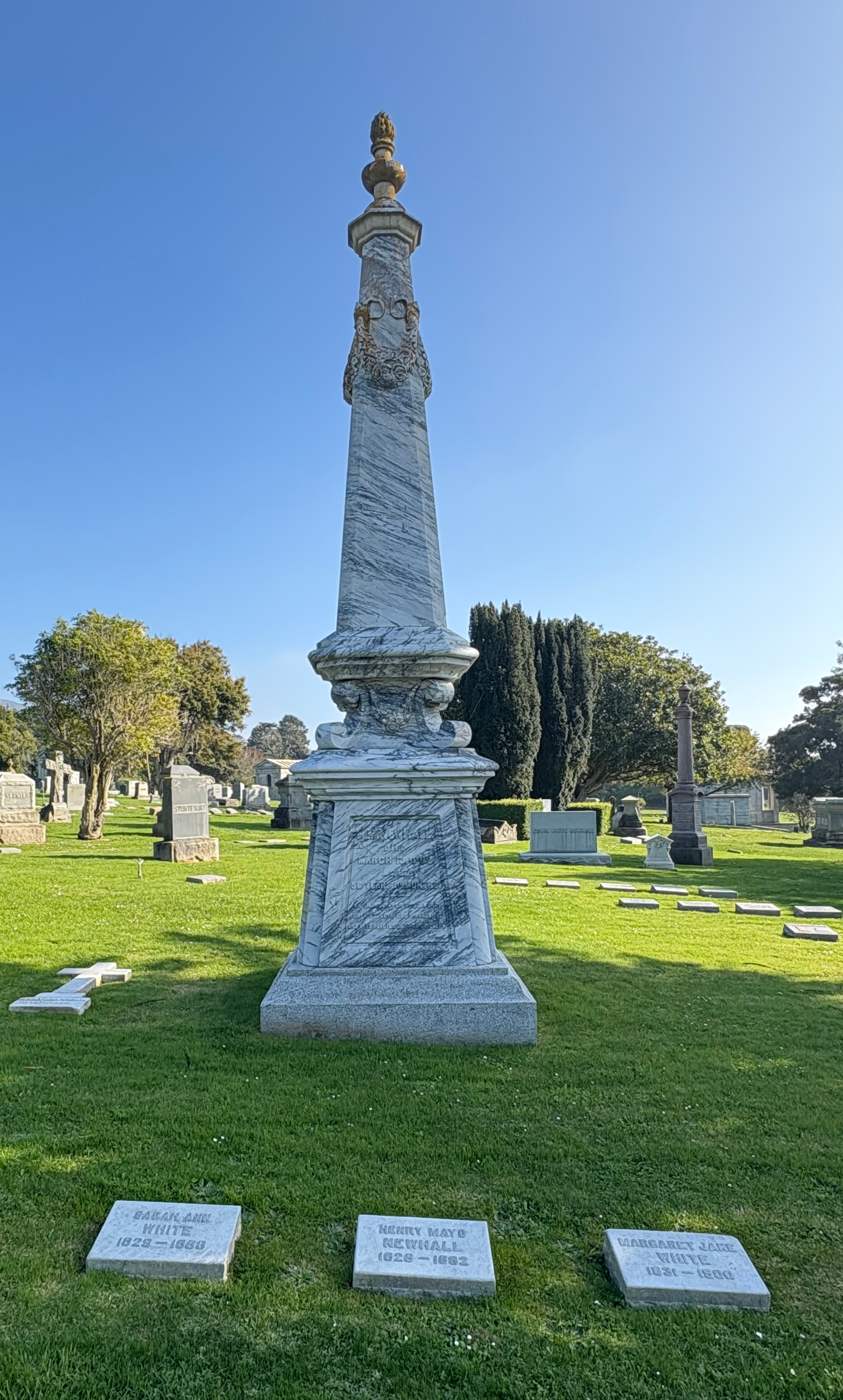
Newhall's grave at Cypress Lawn Memorial Park

Born in Saugus, Massachusetts, Henry Newhall came to California, like many others, in search of gold during the California Gold Rush. He had been working as an auctioneer when news of the gold rush reached the East Coast. He left by ship, arriving on the West Coast in 1850. However, he had been forced to stop in the Isthmus of Panama for six months to recover from an illness he contracted. Upon his arrival in San Francisco, many of the good mining sites had already been claimed, so he opened an auction house instead. H.M. Newhall & Company became extremely successful.

Newhall's next business interest was railroads. He invested in rail companies that would connect San Francisco to other cities and became president of the San Francisco and San Jose Rail Road. In 1870, when he and his partners sold the company to Southern Pacific Railroad, he joined its board of directors.

After railroads, Newhall turned his eye to auctioneering, real estate and ranching. He purchased 143,000 acres (579 km^{2}) of Mexican land grants, including Rancho Todos Santos y San Antonio, and Rancho Suey in Santa Barbara County, and Rancho El Piojo and Rancho San Miguelito de Trinidad in Monterey County.

The most significant acquisition was the historic land grant 46,460-acre (188 km^{2}) Rancho San Francisco in the Santa Clarita Valley of northern Los Angeles County, which he purchased for $2/acre. It included portions of the Santa Clara River and the Santa Susana Mountains, the former homeland of the Tataviam Native Americans. The ranch became known as Newhall Ranch after his death. Within this territory, he granted a right-of-way to Southern Pacific Railroad through what is now Newhall Pass, and he also sold them a portion of the land, upon which the company built a town they named after him: Newhall. He named the first station on the line Saugus after his hometown of Saugus, Massachusetts.

Newhall split his time between his ranch in the Santa Clarita Valley and his auction house and residence in San Francisco, but after a bout of food poisoning in 1880, he retired to his ranch. In March 1882, while horseback riding around his property, he was thrown from the horse. Taken back to San Francisco for treatment, he died a few days later on March 13, 1882. He was buried at Cypress Lawn Memorial Park in Colma.

Henry Newhall's heirs incorporated the Newhall Land and Farming Company, which oversaw the construction of Valencia, a master-planned community in the Santa Clarita Valley adjacent to Saugus and Newhall. Henry Mayo Newhall is memorialized by the Henry Mayo Newhall Memorial Hospital, several street names in the area once part of the Newhall Ranch (including Newhall Ranch Road and Newhall Avenue), and the Henry Mayo Newhall Foundation.
