= Henry Mayo Newhall Memorial Hospital =

Hospital in Santa Clarita, California

Henry Mayo Newhall Hospital
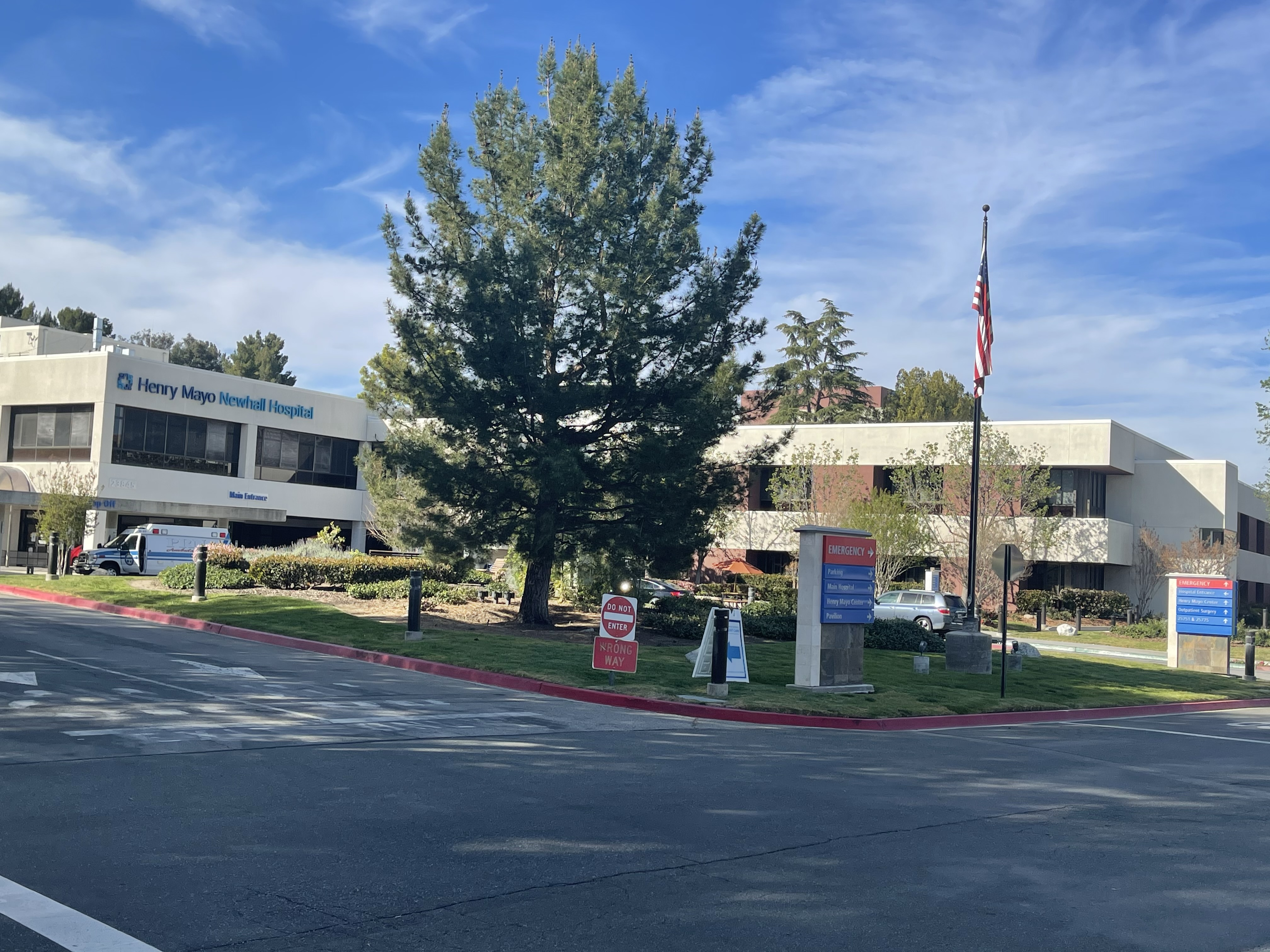

Geography
- Location: 23845 McBean Parkway; Santa Clarita, California 91355; United States
- Coordinates: 34°23′52″N 118°33′12″W

Organisation
- Type: Community

Services
- Emergency department: II
- Beds: 357

Helipads
- Helipad: Yes

History
- Founded: 1975

Links
- Website: henrymayo.com

Henry Mayo Newhall Hospital (commonly referred to as Henry Mayo Hospital) is a 357-bed not-for-profit community hospital and trauma center in Valencia, Santa Clarita, California. It was founded in 1975. Named after businessman Henry Mayo Newhall, the hospital recently opened a new patient tower that includes 90 private patient rooms and a new Center for Women and Newborns, also with all private rooms.

Henry Mayo is an Advanced Primary Stroke Center and a STEMI Receiving Center. The hospital features inpatient facilities, a neonatal intensive care unit, catheterization lab, infusion center, breast center and an outpatient surgery center.

Additional services include cardiovascular, trauma, emergency, intensive care, neonatal intensive care, maternity, surgery, nursing, wound care, spine and joint, behavioral health, and acute rehab, as well as cancer, imaging, lab, digestive, respiratory services and physical and occupational therapies.

== Fitness center ==
Henry Mayo Fitness and Health offers personal training, group fitness classes, and basic gym amenities. Henry Mayo Fitness and Health also houses Henry Mayo's outpatient physical therapy clinic and two community education classrooms. Almost all the community education classrooms are free and open to the community. Henry Mayo Fitness and Health is located at 24525 Town Center Drive, near the southwest corner of Magic Mountain Parkway and McBean Parkway, about 1.9 miles (3.1 km) north of the main Henry Mayo Newhall Hospital campus.

== Diabetes prevention program ==
The PreventT2 program is designed to help prediabetics make lifestyle changes that will prevent or significantly delay the onset of Type 2 diabetes. The PreventT2 Program is part of the National Diabetes Prevention Program, led by the Centers for Disease Control and Prevention (CDC).

== Disaster resource center ==
Henry Mayo is part of the Los Angeles County Disaster Resource Center (DRC) network, which comprises 13 trauma centers, hospitals, and management base stations located throughout Los Angeles.

== Volunteer services ==
Volunteers provide services in the Gift Shop, Patient Support/Nursing Units, Special Events, Information Desk and Waiting Room Ambassadors, Emergency Department, and Pet Visitation.

== Henry Mayo Newhall Hospital Foundation ==
The Henry Mayo Newhall Hospital Foundation raises funds for the capital needs of Henry Mayo Newhall Hospital. Established in 1984.

== Additional services ==
Services:

- Advanced Primary Stroke Center
- Acute Rehabilitation Unit
- Behavioral Health Unit
- Cancer Program
- Cardiovascular Services
- Diabetes Management Program
- Digestive Services
- Infusion Center
- Joint Replacement and Spine Surgery Programs
- Maternity Services
  - Labor of Love Maternity Classes
  - Lactation Services
- Neonatal Intensive Care Unit
- Outpatient Surgery Center
- Outpatient Therapy Services
- Outpatient Laboratory Services
- Respiratory Services
- Sheila R. Veloz Breast Center
- Spine Program
- Trauma Center
- Wound Care Services
