= Rancho Los Ojitos =

Mexican land grant in California

Coordinates: 35.930°N 121.120°W

Rancho Los Ojitos was a 8,900-acre (36 km^{2}) Mexican land grant in present-day Monterey County, California, given in 1842 by Governor Juan Alvarado to Mariano de Jesus Soberanes. The grant is now mostly Lake San Antonio which was created when the San Antonio dam was built across the San Antonio River.

== History ==
With secularization, the lands of the Mission San Antonio de Padua were divided into at least ten Mexican land grants (including Rancho Milpitas (Little Fields), Rancho El Piojo (The Louse), Rancho San Miguelito de Trinidad, and Rancho Los Ojitos (Little Springs) ). The Soberanes family patriarch, José Maria Soberanes (1753–1803) accompanied the Portola expedition to San Francisco Bay in 1769. Soberanes married Maria Josefa Castro (1759–1822) and received Rancho Buena Vista. His sons, Feliciano Soberanes (1788–1868) and Mariano de Jesus Soberanes, and William Edward Petty Hartnell were granted Rancho El Alisal in 1833.

Mariano de Jesus Soberanes (1794–1859) was a soldier and also held the office of alcade in Monterey. Mariano Soberanes married María Isidora Vallejo (1791–1830), sister of General Mariano Guadalupe Vallejo. Their daughter, Maria Ygnacia Soberanes, married Dr. Edward Turner Bale grantee of Rancho Carne Humana. Mariano de Jesus Soberanes was granted Rancho San Bernardo and the two square league, former lands of the Mission San Antonio de Padua, Rancho Los Ojitos in 1842. In 1844, Mariano de Jesus Soberanes married Governor Alvarado's mistress, Maria Raimunda Castillo (1813–1880), the daughter of Jose Castillo and Zeferina Sinaloba of Monterey. In 1845 Soberanes was judge at San Miguel. In 1846, during the Mexican–American War, Soberanes was arrested with his sons by soldiers of Frémont and his property at Rancho Los Ojitos destroyed.

With the cession of California to the United States following the Mexican-American War, the 1848 Treaty of Guadalupe Hidalgo provided that the land grants would be honored. As required by the Land Act of 1851, a claim for Rancho Los Ojitos was filed with the Public Land Commission in 1853, and the grant was patented to Mariano Soberanes in 1871.

By 1880, the James Brown Cattle Company owned and operated Rancho Los Ojitos. In 1940, in preparation for involvement in World War II, the U.S. War Department purchased the land to create a troop training facility known as the Hunter Liggett Military Reservation.
