= Newhall Land and Farming Company =

Land management company in California, US

- Type: Subsidiary
- Industry: Real estate
- Founded: 1883
- Founder: Newhall family
- Headquarters: 25124 Springfield Court, Santa Clarita, California 91355, United States
- Parent: FivePoint
- Website: http://www.valencia.com/

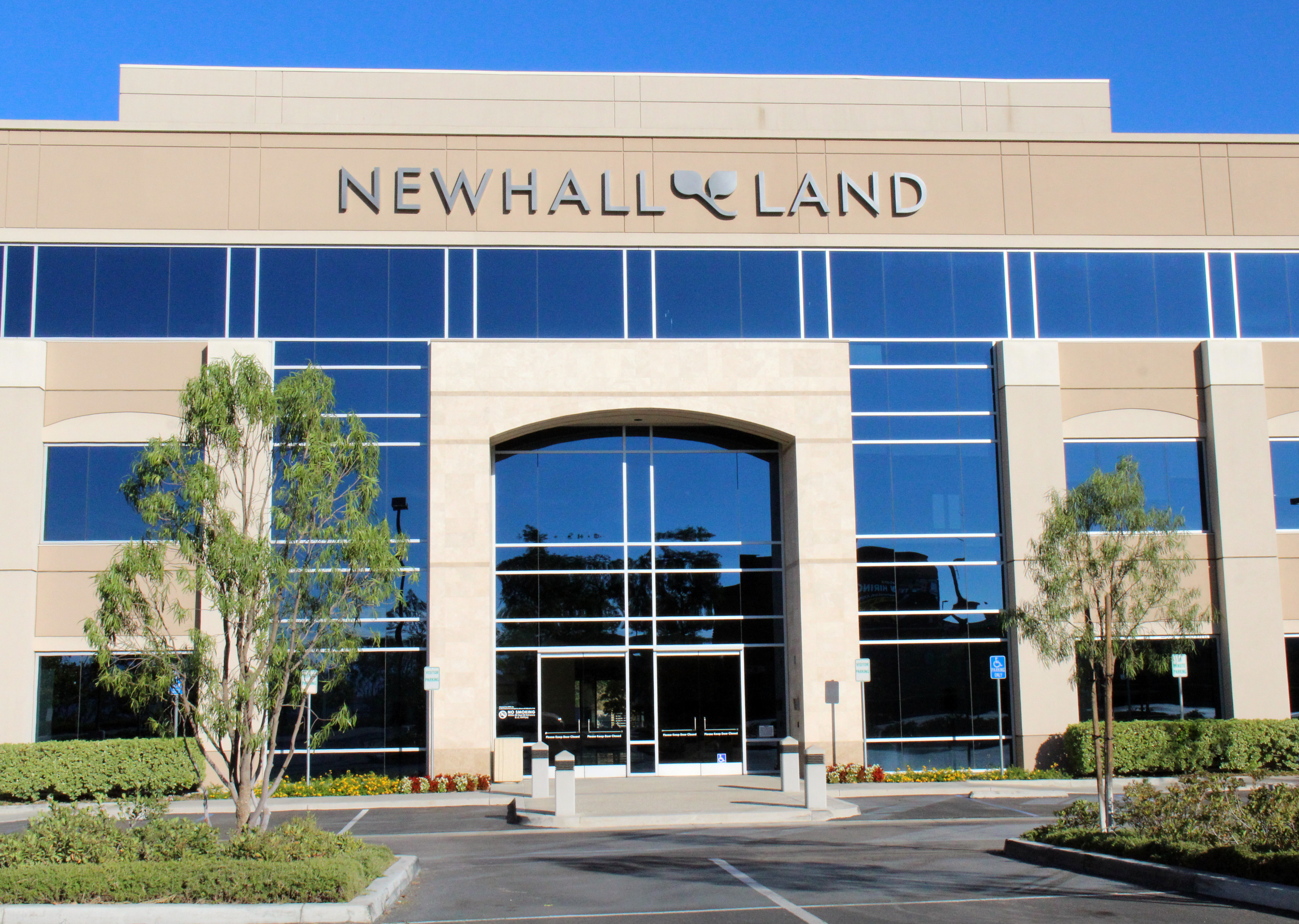
Newhall Land headquarters in Valencia, July 2015

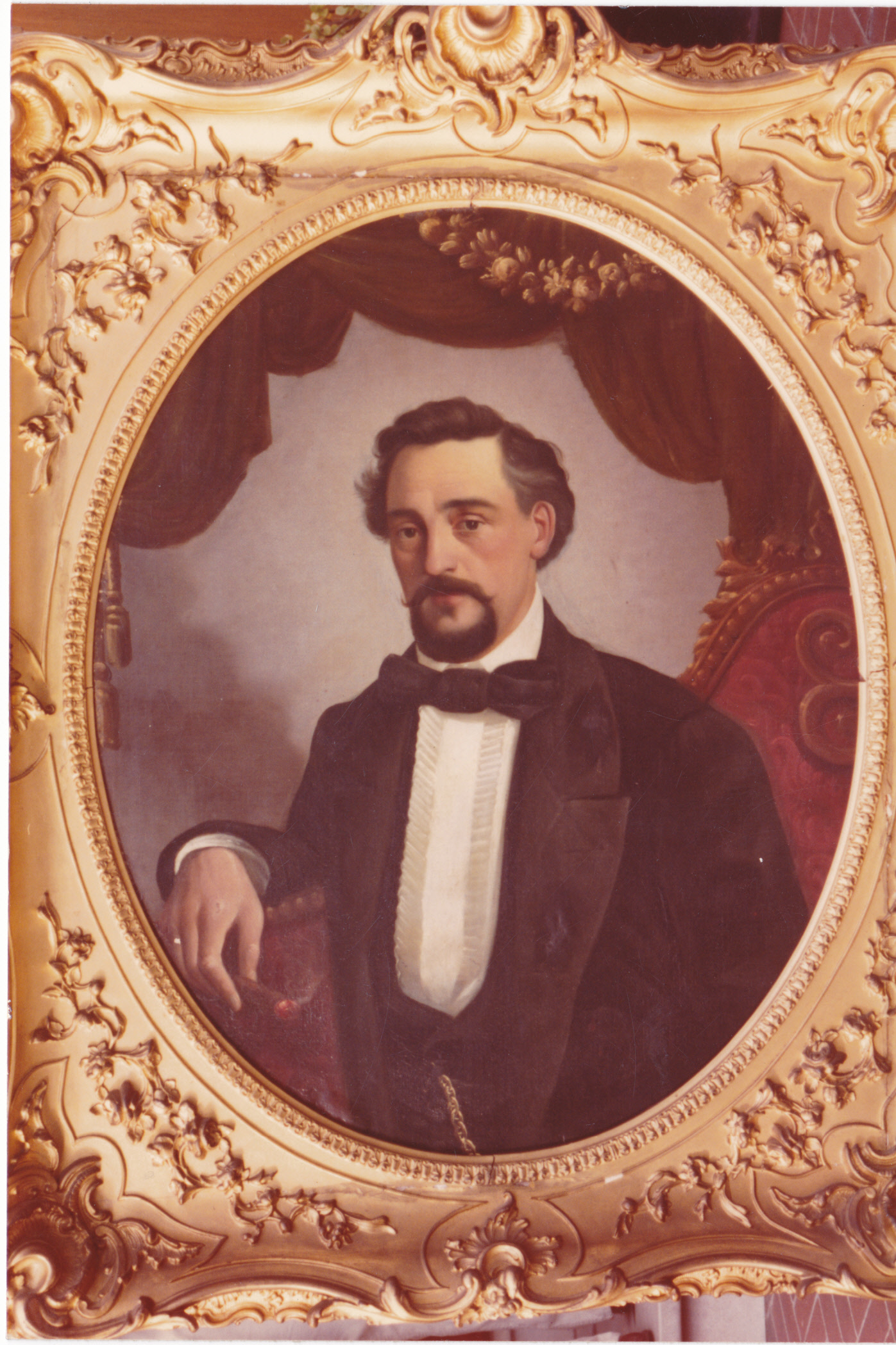
Portrait of Henry Newhall by Ruth Newhall

The Newhall Land and Farming Company is a land management company based in Valencia which is part of Santa Clarita, California, United States. The company is responsible for the master community planning of Valencia and previously developed other areas such as Canyon Country and Newhall which together with Saugus and Valencia merged creating the city of Santa Clarita in 1987. The company is also responsible for the management of farm land elsewhere in the state.

== Company history ==
The company was incorporated on July 1, 1883, by the five sons of Henry Newhall (William, Edwin, Henry, Walter, and George), a businessman who had purchased a number of former Mexican land grants. Newhall died young, the previous year, after building the railway with San Francisco industrialist Tom Donahue linking San Francisco and San Jose and several successful enterprises. Newhall Road still runs parallel to the railway in Santa Clara and San Francisco counties. The company initially had 143,000 acres (58,000 ha) of land, ranging from Monterey to Los Angeles counties. The income generated by ranching was not enough to support the families of all five sons in the lifestyle they had grown up with, and they began to sell off portions of their vast holdings in order to generate income. In 1968 the family company retained 120,000 acres (49,000 ha) of California real estate after the sale of the 1,000,000 acre Baca Grant in Colorado in early 1960.

Successive land sales allowed the Newhall family to maintain their lifestyle, but William (who was known by his middle name Mayo), a graduate of Yale University, understood that they needed a better way to generate income. After a few more land sales, Mayo took the income and reinvested it into the land by developing agriculture. The land around their headquarters, the former Rancho San Francisco, was cleared for citrus trees and lima beans were planted in the Sacramento Valley. The income from these crops allowed the company to grow in the 1920s. Additionally, one more land sale (comprising the land where Hearst built San Simeon), a 38,000 acre (150 km^{2}) ranch in 1922 to William Randolph Hearst for $1 million (to be paid in installments over ten years) helped fill the company's coffers.

The collapse of the St. Francis Dam in 1928 was devastating to the company. Much of its livestock, orchards, and buildings were destroyed. Although the city of Los Angeles agreed to pay reparations for its role in the dam's construction, those payments would not be available for some time. Compounding the problem was the onset of the Great Depression. George Newhall, who was the last surviving of Mayo's brothers and treasurer of the company, died that year, and Mayo discovered that the company was on the brink of insolvency.

At this point, Mayo was in his late seventies and growing increasingly frail. He turned the operation over to his son-in-law, Atholl McBean, a San Francisco businessman who had held onto his entire savings during the Wall Street crash. The company was able to hold on long enough for the reparations payments to come through, and with the last of the Hearst payments, was enough for the company to climb out of debt. By his third year in charge, Newhall Land and Farming reported a profit of $25,000 and by 1935, they resumed dividend payments, the first since 1930.

Henry Newhall had purchased Rancho San Francisco from speculators who had purchased it from Ygnacio del Valle in the hopes of finding crude oil. Alex Mentry had discovered oil in 1876 just to the south of the rancho (which became the Pico Canyon Oilfield), but the group of investors who sold to Newhall (25 cents per acre) had had no such luck. McBean was convinced no oil was to be found on the land Newhall Ranch, but he leased it to Barnsdall Oil Company anyway.To the family's good fortune, Barnsdall struck oil in 1937 and there was so much oil that over the next few years, 44 oil wells were producing millions of dollars ending their cash flow problems.

By the 1950s, urbanization began to encroach on Newhall Ranch. The County of Los Angeles, hoping to encourage more residential development, changed its rules for property taxes, taxing land at what its "best use" would be, regardless of its actual use. Newhall Ranch was assessed to be a residential zone, which substantially increased the tax burden of Newhall Land and Farming (the Williamson Act was passed in 1965 to counteract the problem, but it came too late for Newhall Ranch). McBean understood that agriculture alone was not going to pay the taxes, and that if the land was to be designated for residential homes, the company might as well head in that direction.

Real estate developers made offers to buy the land, but family members did not want to sell pieces of the family homestead. Instead, McBean and the board hired city planners and the company opted to create a brand new community, which would be called Valencia, prompted by the advice of Director Scott Newhall who was founder of the newspaper, The Newhall Signal, after the oranges they had grown for so many years. Construction began in the early 1960s, the Master Plan was adopted in 1965, and in 1967 the first new homeowners moved in. McBean retired soon after, hiring Stanford Business school graduates to manage the company while family members comprised all Board of Directors seats.

As part of the original master plan, an anchor college for the community was included. A school envisioned by Walt Disney to be focused on the arts in combination was seeking a home, and against other sites including the Hollywood Hills across from the Hollywood Bowl and Malibu (now the home of Pepperdine University), Valencia was chosen. The Newhall Land and Farming Co. donated the land. Construction began on the California Institute of the Arts in 1968, and the college opened doors in November 1971.

In 1971, the Newhall Land entered into a joint venture with SeaWorld Co. and opened the Magic Mountain amusement park, which was sold to Six Flags in 1979 for $51 million. In the 1980s, the company expanded its oil interests to seven states and Canada, under the leadership of Jim Finch, vice president and head of the oil and gas division and found another revenue source in leasing its land for film and television show production. In 1994, the company submitted plans to the county for a massive master-planned community in unincorporated Valencia which was not part of the original master plan.

In 2004, the company was acquired by Lennar and LNR Corporation for approximately $1 billion, leaving Newhall Land and Farming owning 50% and Lennar and its industrial and commercial properties spinoff LNR owning the other 50% through a new holding company called LandSource Communities Development LLC. In early 2007, by a further transaction, Lennar and LNR each sold 34% interests in LandSource Communities Development LLC to a new set of investors, including the California Public Employees Retirement System. In June 2008, LandSource Communities Development LLC, along with Newhall Land and Farming Company and other subsidiaries, filed for Chapter 11 bankruptcy protection with the US Bankruptcy Court for the District of Delaware. In July 2009, LandSource Communities Development LLC and its subsidiaries emerged from bankruptcy under a new control structure with a new set of owners.

=== Baca Grant ===
The firm owned one of the largest ranches in the U.S., of 1,000,000 acres, the Luis Maria Baca Grant No. 4, near Crestone, Colorado in Saguache County, Colorado, in the San Luis Valley from 1951 until 1962. Retaining the mineral rights, Newhall sold it to Arizona-Colorado Land and Cattle Company in 1962.
