= National Register of Historic Places listings in St. Croix County, Wisconsin =

Location of St. Croix County in Wisconsin

This is a list of the National Register of Historic Places listings in St. Croix County, Wisconsin. It is intended to provide a comprehensive listing of entries in the National Register of Historic Places that are located in St. Croix County, Wisconsin. The locations of National Register properties for which the latitude and longitude coordinates are included below may be seen in a map.

There are 36 properties and districts listed on the National Register in the county. Another property was once listed but has been removed.

This National Park Service list is complete through NPS recent listings posted August 8, 2025.

== Current listings ==
	Name on the Register	Image	Date listed	Location	City or town	Description
1	Marcus Sears Bell Farm	Marcus Sears Bell Farm	May 31, 1988 (#88000614)	1100 Heritage Dr. 45°06′38″N 92°32′06″W	New Richmond	Italianate farmhouse and granary built in 1884 and barn built in 1916. Bell was a farmer, real estate developer, and civic leader. Today the farm is the site of the New Richmond Heritage Center.
2	William J. Bernd House	William J. Bernd House	May 31, 1988 (#88000616)	143 Arch Ave., N 45°07′25″N 92°32′09″W	New Richmond	Princess Anne-style (late, simple Queen Anne) house built in 1907, a typical style in the decade after the 1899 tornado. Bernd was a farmer, livestock breeder, and real estate developer.
3	William J. Bernd House	William J. Bernd House	May 31, 1988 (#88000615)	210 Second St., E 45°07′17″N 92°32′07″W	New Richmond	Well-preserved 1.5 story bungalow built between 1912 and 1927.
4	Chicago, St. Paul, Minneapolis and Omaha Railroad Car Shop Historic District	Chicago, St. Paul, Minneapolis and Omaha Railroad Car Shop Historic District	October 4, 1984 (#84000072)	Roughly bounded by Gallahad Rd., Sommer, 4th and St. Croix Sts. 44°59′43″N 92°45′38″W	North Hudson	Buildings of the Chicago, St. Paul, Minneapolis and Omaha Railway, including 1890 Passenger Car Shop, 1890 Freight Car Shop, 1904 paint and upholstery shop, and 1916 hand car repair shop.
5	Frederick L. Darling House	Frederick L. Darling House	October 4, 1984 (#84000060)	617 3rd St. 44°58′36″N 92°45′21″W	Hudson	1857 home of dry goods merchant Darling. Described as "the supreme example" of Greek Revival homes in Hudson.
6	William Dwelley House	William Dwelley House	October 4, 1984 (#84000061)	1002 4th St. 44°58′50″N 92°45′13″W	Hudson	Fine Italianate house built in 1865. Dwelley was an "explorer, scaler of logs, and surveyor."
7	Dr. Frank W. Epley Office	Dr. Frank W. Epley Office	May 31, 1988 (#88000617)	137 Third St., E 45°07′15″N 92°32′11″W	New Richmond	Epley was a progressive early physician, mayor, founder of power and phone utilities, and churchman. His office, built in 1883, was damaged by the 1899 tornado, but from it he salvaged medical supplies and helped lead the recovery.
8	First English Lutheran Church		May 31, 1988 (#88000618)	354 Third St., N 45°07′44″N 92°32′31″W	New Richmond	Gothic Revival-styled church built in 1906 by Swedish Lutherans. Early sermons were in Swedish and English. Bought in 1945 and restyled by Episcopal congregation.
9	Ezra Glover, Jr., House	Ezra Glover, Jr., House	May 31, 1988 (#88000619)	415 Second St., E 45°07′19″N 92°31′54″W	New Richmond	Clapboard Colonial Revival house built around 1900, probably by Ezra Glover who cashiered at Manufacturer's bank and owned a general store. Served as New Richmond's first hospital from 1928 for over 20 years, operated by the McNamara sisters.
10	Hudson Public Library	Hudson Public Library	October 4, 1984 (#84000062)	304 Locust St. 44°58′33″N 92°45′19″W	Hudson	Carnegie library designed by Van Ryn & DeGelleke in Neoclassical style and opened in 1904.
11	Herman L. Humphrey House	Herman L. Humphrey House	October 4, 1984 (#84000063)	803 Orange St. 44°58′46″N 92°44′51″W	Hudson	Two-story brick Italianate house built in 1860 by Humphrey, who was lawyer, judge, mayor of Hudson, state representative, and U.S. congressman.
12	August Johnson House	August Johnson House	October 4, 1984 (#84000064)	427 St. Croix St. 44°58′58″N 92°45′10″W	Hudson	2.5 story Queen Anne house with exterior of cobblestone cast in concrete blocks, built in 1902 by Johnson, himself a mason.
13	Dr. Samuel C. Johnson House	Dr. Samuel C. Johnson House	October 4, 1984 (#84000065)	405 Locust St. 44°58′34″N 92°45′13″W	Hudson	2.5 story clapboard Queen Anne house built in 1884 for Johnson, a surgeon who had fought at Shiloh, directed the Hudson sanatorium, and served as Hudson mayor and Wisconsin's surgeon general.
14	William H. Kell House	William H. Kell House	May 31, 1988 (#88000620)	215 Green Ave., S 45°07′17″N 92°32′03″W	New Richmond	Italianate-styled house clad in clapboard and wood shingles, probably built in 1875.
15	Kinnickinnic Church	Kinnickinnic Church	October 6, 2000 (#00001190)	WI J, jct. with WI JJ; 44°54′49″N 92°32′37″W	Kinnickinnic	Greek Revival style church built in 1868. Initially Methodists and Congregationalists worshiped there on alternate Sundays. Used as a church until 1951. Now a museum.
16	Louis C. and Augusta Kriesel Farmstead		February 12, 2009 (#09000021)	132 State Trunk Hwy 35/64; 45°04′18″N 92°46′17″W	St. Joseph	Diversified farm built 1900 to 1910, including farmhouse, barn, silo, machine shed, granary, chicken house/hoghouse/slaughterhouse, corn crib, smokehouse and creamery.
17	Lewis Farmhouse		March 19, 1982 (#82000709)	1270 County Hwy A 45°02′45″N 92°37′31″W	Boardman	Gabled ell farmhouse built 1867. Also called Willow River Farm.
18	Lewis-Williams House	Lewis-Williams House	January 2, 1985 (#85000050)	101 3rd St. 44°58′16″N 92°45′18″W	Hudson	Gothic Revival house with stucco exterior, built in 1860. Hudson native Boyd T. Williams was a physician and cancer researcher who ran a cancer sanatorium in Minneapolis and later in this house in Hudson. His wife said he thought "a doctor doesn't know his patients unless he lives with them."
19	Samuel T. Merritt House	Samuel T. Merritt House	October 4, 1984 (#84000066)	904 7th St. 44°58′46″N 92°44′56″W	Hudson	Two-story Clapboard Italianate house built in 1867. A Yankee who arrived in 1862, Merritt supposedly was the first to ship wheat down the river to LaCrosse, in the late 1860s.
20	Joseph Mielke House	Joseph Mielke House	May 31, 1988 (#88000621)	326 Second St., W 45°07′17″N 92°32′28″W	New Richmond	Considered the finest example of a Dutch Colonial Revival home in New Richmond. Built around 1900.
21	John S. Moffat House	John S. Moffat House	July 18, 1974 (#74000124)	1004 3rd St. 44°58′51″N 92°45′19″W	Hudson	Octagon house built in 1854, originally in Greek Revival style and later restyled as Italianate. Moffat was a judge, originally from New York. The building is now the museum of the St. Croix County Historical Society.
22	New Richmond Commercial Historic District		December 22, 2022 (#100008475)	Bounded by rear properties facing South Knowles Ave., Willow R., and 3rd St. 45°07′14″N 92°32′15″W	New Richmond	The old downtown, rebuilt in brick after the 1899 tornado destroyed the previous downtown. Survivors include the 1899 saloon at 208 S Knowles, the 1900 Grocery and Crockery Store, the 1900 Hagan Opera House, the 1905 Beebe Hotel, the 1906 Nelson's Confectionary, the 1913 Gem Theatre, and the 1917 Neoclassical-style Bank of New Richmond.
23	New Richmond East Side Historic District		October 3, 2022 (#100008225)	Bounded by South Arch Ave., the rear of properties facing East 2nd St., South Starr Ave., and East 3rd St. 45°07′16″N 92°32′04″W	New Richmond	Small neighborhood developed from the 1870s to 1920s, including the 1875 Italianate style Kell house, the 1880 gabled-ell Wyman house, the 1900 Queen Anne/Stick Bosworth house, the 1913 Craftsman Strand house, and the 1921 Statz bungalow.
24	New Richmond News Building	New Richmond News Building	May 31, 1988 (#88000625)	145 Second St., W 45°07′19″N 92°32′18″W	New Richmond	Two-story brick office building built in 1913 for the local newspaper that Abe Van Meter began as the St. Croix Republican in 1869, and evolved through mergers and 100 years of Van Meters to today's New Richmond News.
25	New Richmond Roller Mills Co.		May 31, 1988 (#88000622)	201 Knowles Ave., N 45°07′27″N 92°32′20″W	New Richmond	Concrete grain elevator and mill complex built in 1916 after fire destroyed previous mills. A gristmill had been on the site since 1867, then flour mills, now Doboy/Domain. Mostly demolished.
26	New Richmond West Side Historic District	New Richmond West Side Historic District	May 31, 1988 (#88000626)	Roughly bounded by Willow River, Minnesota Ave., W. Second St., S. Washington Ave. 45°07′26″N 92°32′33″W	New Richmond	28 contributing properties, ranging from the Italianate Bartlett house built in 1873 to the 1887 Shingle-style Mosher house designed by Gilbert and Taylor, to the 1929 Colonial Revival Doar house designed by Roy Childs Jones.
27	Opera Hall Block	Opera Hall Block	March 7, 1979 (#79000114)	516 2nd St. 44°58′30″N 92°45′23″W	Hudson	Theater built in 1880.
28	William H. Phipps House	William H. Phipps House	June 18, 1987 (#87000991)	1005 Third St. 44°58′50″N 92°45′21″W	Hudson	Hudson's finest Queen Anne home, built in 1884, with a three-story octagonal tower. Phipps was an executive of the North Wisconsin Railway and a philanthropist.
29	Second Street Commercial District	Second Street Commercial District	October 4, 1984 (#84000067)	Roughly 1st, 2nd, Walnut, and Locust Sts. 44°58′30″N 92°45′25″W	Hudson	22 contributing buildings which comprise the commercial core of Hudson's downtown, mostly built after the fire of 1866 with fireproof exteriors.
30	Sixth Street Historic District	Sixth Street Historic District	October 4, 1984 (#84000069)	Roughly 6th St. between Myrtle and Vine Sts. 44°58′47″N 92°45′03″W	Hudson	Prestigious residential neighborhood, including a Greek Revival home, a Gothic Revival home, an Italianate home, the 1885 Queen Anne David C. Fulton House, and bungalows.
31	Soo Line Depot	Soo Line Depot	May 31, 1988 (#88000623)	120 High St. 45°07′35″N 92°32′23″W	New Richmond	One-story stone-clad depot built in 1915 by the Wisconsin Central Railway, which later merged into the Soo Line. Served passengers until 1968.
32	Soo Line High Bridge	Soo Line High Bridge	August 22, 1977 (#77000056)	Address Restricted; 45°07′23″N 92°44′39″W	Somerset	Dramatic 2,600-foot-long (790 m), 184-foot-high (56 m) multi-span steel arch bridge built 1910–11, noted for its exceptional dimensions, beauty, innovative engineering techniques, and importance.
33	St Croix County Courthouse	St Croix County Courthouse	March 9, 1982 (#82000710)	904 3rd St. 44°58′47″N 92°45′17″W	Hudson	Massive red sandstone and brick courthouse designed by William Towner in Richardsonian Romanesque style and built in 1910.
34	Stillwater Bridge	Stillwater Bridge	May 25, 1989 (#89000445)	MN 36/WI 64 over St. Croix River; 45°03′23″N 92°48′12″W	Houlton	Rare example of a vertical-lift highway bridge based on a Waddell & Harrington design, built in 1931. Extends into Washington County, Minnesota.
35	John Nicholas and Hermina Thelen House		February 12, 2009 (#09000022)	1383 and 1405 Thelen Farm Trail; 45°03′59″N 92°46′25″W	St. Joseph	Farmstead which spans from wheat-farming era to dairy, including Italianate farmhouse built in 1885, 1873 stone smokehouse, 1873 granary, and 1917 barn and silo.
36	Erick J. Thompson House	Erick J. Thompson House	May 31, 1988 (#88000624)	350 Second St., W 45°07′17″N 92°32′29″W	New Richmond	2.5 story Queen Anne house built in 1893, with matching carriage house. Also known as J. McNally House.

== Former listings ==
	Name on the Register	Image	Date listed	Date removed	Location	City or town	Description
1	T.E. Williams Block		October 4, 1984 (#84000070)	July 1, 2009	321 2nd St. 44°58′25″N 92°45′26″W	Hudson	Italianate commercial block with facade of rusticated limestone.

== See also ==
- List of National Historic Landmarks in Wisconsin
- National Register of Historic Places listings in Wisconsin
- Listings in neighboring counties: Barron, Dunn, Pierce, Polk, Washington (MN)
