= West Side =

West Side or Westside may refer to:

== Places ==
=== Canada ===
- West Side, a neighbourhood of Windsor, Ontario
- West Side, a neighbourhood of Vancouver, British Columbia

=== United Kingdom ===
- West Side, Lewis, Outer Hebrides, Scotland
- Westside, Birmingham England
- Westside, Gibraltar

=== United States ===
- Westside, California (disambiguation), any of several places
- Westside, Jacksonville, Florida
- Westside, Georgia
- Westside, Atlanta, Georgia
- West Side, Chicago, Illinois
- Westside (Gary), Indiana
- Westside, Iowa
- Westside, Baltimore, Maryland
- West Side, Wakefield, Massachusetts
- West Springfield, Massachusetts
- West Side, Saint Paul, Minnesota
- West Side, Manchester, New Hampshire
- West Side, Jersey City, New Jersey
- West Side, Newark, New Jersey
- West Side (Manhattan), New York City, New York
- West Side, Binghamton, New York
- Westside, Syracuse, New York
- West Side, Oregon
- West Side (Charleston), West Virginia

== Education ==
- Westside High School (disambiguation), any of several schools
- Westside Community Schools, Omaha, Nebraska
- West Lafayette Junior-Senior High School, Indiana
- West Seattle High School, Washington

== Music ==
- Westlife, originally Westside, an Irish pop vocal group
- Westside (album), by JJ Lin, 2007
- "Westside" (TQ song), 1998
- "West Side", a song by the Game from Born 2 Rap, 2019
- "The West Side", a song by Phil Collins from Hello, I Must Be Going!, 1982
- "Westside", a song by Ariana Grande from Positions, 2020
- "Westside", a song by Athlete from Vehicles & Animals, 2003
- "Westside", a song by Fetty Wap, 2016
- "Westside", a song by Jay Rock from Follow Me Home, 2011
- "Westside", a song by Lil Yachty from Lil Boat 3, 2020
- Westside Records, a record label owned by Demon Music Group

== Radio ==
- Westside 89.6 FM, a West London radio station

== Television ==
- Westside (New Zealand TV series), a 2015–2020 comedy-drama
- Westside (2018 TV series), an American music reality series
- Westside, a 2013 American pilot episode written and produced by Byron Balasco
- "Westside" (Southland), a 2009 episode

== Other ==
- West Side Place, a skyscraper complex in Melbourne, Australia
- Westside Shopping and Leisure Centre, near Bern, Switzerland
- Trent (Westside), a retail chain in India
- West Side Highway (disambiguation)
- West Side Historic District (disambiguation)

== See also ==
- West Side Line (disambiguation), any of several rail lines
- West Side Story (disambiguation)
- Westside Township (disambiguation)
