= William J. Bernd House =

William J. Bernd House may refer to:

- William J. Bernd House (Arch Avenue, New Richmond, Wisconsin), listed on the National Register of Historic Places in St. Croix County, Wisconsin
- William J. Bernd House (Second Street, New Richmond, Wisconsin), listed on the National Register of Historic Places in St. Croix County, Wisconsin
