= Dwelly =

Dwelly is a surname. Notable people with the surname include:

- Edward Dwelly (1864–1939), English lexicographer and genealogist
- Frederick Dwelly (1881–1957), English clergyman

== See also ==
- Dwele
- Dwelley
