= William Phipps =

William, Bill, or Billy Phipps may refer to:

- Sir William Phips or Phipps (1651–1695), English governor of the Province of Massachusetts Bay
- William Phipps (Governor of Bombay), British governor of Bombay 1722–1729
- William Henry Phipps (1846–1924), English-born senator for the U.S. state of Wisconsin
- William Edward Phipps (1922–2018), American film and television actor
- Billy Phipps (1931–2011), American jazz baritone saxophonist and composer
- Bill Phipps (1942-2022), Canadian church leader and social justice activist

== See also ==
- William H. Phipps House, a historic building in Hudson, Wisconsin
