= North Hudson =

North Hudson is the name of the following places in the United States of America:

- North Hudson, New Jersey
- North Hudson, New York
- North Hudson, Wisconsin
