= West Side Historic District =

West Side Historic District may refer to:

- West Side Historic District (Longmont, Colorado), listed on the National Register of Historic Places (NRHP) in Boulder County
- West Side Historic District (Aurora, Illinois), listed on the NRHP in Kane County
- West Side Historic District (Shelbyville, Indiana), listed on the NRHP in Shelby County
- West Side Historic District (Anaconda, Montana), listed on the NRHP in Deer Lodge County
- West Side Historic District (Kalispell, Montana), listed on the NRHP in Flathead County
- West Side Historic District (Carson City, Nevada), listed on the NRHP in Nevada
- West Side Historic District (Hendersonville, North Carolina), listed on the NRHP in Henderson County
- West Side Historic District (Saratoga Springs, New York), listed on the NRHP in Saratoga County
- West Side Historic District (Corsicana, Texas), listed on the NRHP in Navarro County
- New Richmond West Side Historic District, listed on the NRHP in St. Croix County, Wisconsin
