= Justice Loring =

Justice Loring may refer to:

- Charles Loring (judge) (1873–1961), chief justice of the Minnesota Supreme Court
- William Loring (judge) (1851–1930), associate justice of the Massachusetts Supreme Judicial Court
