= Westside Township =

Westside Township may refer to one of the following places in the United States:

- Westside Township, Nobles County, Minnesota
- Westside Township, Phelps County, Nebraska

== See also ==
- West Side Township, Crawford County, Iowa
- Westside (disambiguation)
- West Township (disambiguation)
