= George A. Williams (actor) =

American actor

- Born: August 11, 1854; Kinnickinnic, Wisconsin, U.S.
- Died: February 21, 1936 (aged 81); Los Angeles, California, U.S.
- Occupation: Actor
- Years active: 1913–1927

George A. Williams (August 11, 1854 – February 21, 1936), sometimes known as G.A. Williams or simply as George Williams, was an American actor of the silent film era. Born in 1854 in Kinnickinnic, Wisconsin, he broke into the film industry in 1914. He worked mostly in film shorts, appearing in well over 100 of them in his 14-year career. He would also perform in approximately 20 feature-length films during this span. His first film appearance was in the film short, In the Days of Witchcraft (1913), and he would make his feature debut in 1916's The Dumb Girl of Portici, directed by Lois Weber. 1914 would see him appear in several episodes of the serial, The Hazards of Helen. In 1922, he would be cast as one of the leads in the serial, In the Days of Buffalo Bill, directed by Edward Laemmle. His final film appearance would be in the 1926 silent film, The Winner, directed by Harry J. Brown

== Partial filmography ==
(Per AFI database)

- The Dumb Girl of Portici (1916)
- Langdon's Legacy (1916)
- The Wrong Door (1916)
- The Hazards of Helen — serial (1916)
- The Dawn of Understanding (1918)
- The Market of Souls (1919)
- Todd of the Times (1919)
- Love's Battle (1920)
- The Black Sheep (1921)
- The Fire Eater (1921)
- Headin' West (1922)
- The Long Chance (1922)
- Lucky Dan (1922)
- In the Days of Buffalo Bill — serial (1922)
- Perils of the Yukon — serial (1922)
- The Apache Dancer (1923)
- Dangerous Hour (1923)
- The First Degree (1923)
- The Phantom Horseman (1924)
- Thundering Romance (1924)
- Super Speed (1925)
