= The Market of Souls =

1919 film by Joe De Grasse

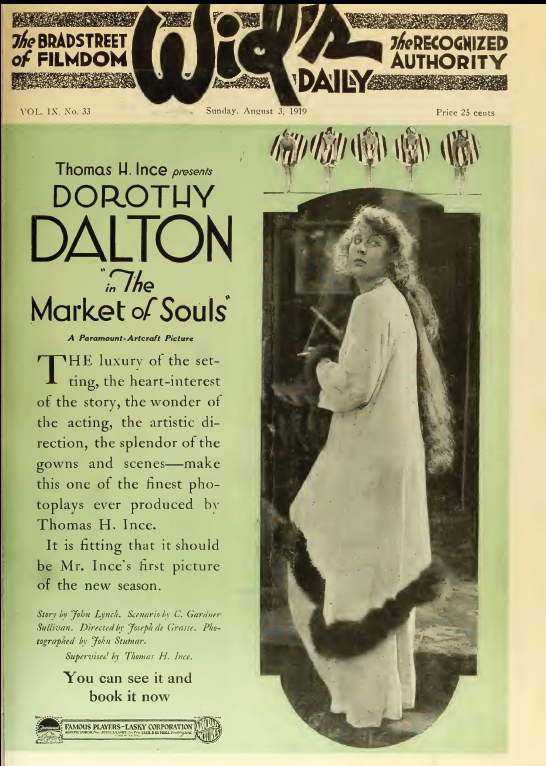
- Ad for film
- Directed by: Joe De Grasse
- Screenplay by: John Lynch; C. Gardner Sullivan
- Produced by: Thomas H. Ince
- Starring: Dorothy Dalton; Holmes Herbert; Philo McCullough; Dorcas Mathews; Donald McDonald; George Williams
- Cinematography: John Stumar
- Edited by: W. Duncan Mansfield
- Production companies: Thomas H. Ince Corporation; Famous Players–Lasky Corporation
- Distributed by: Paramount Pictures
- Release date: September 7, 1919
- Running time: 60 minutes
- Country: United States
- Language: Silent (English intertitles)

The Market of Souls is a 1919 American silent drama film directed by Joe De Grasse and written by John Lynch and C. Gardner Sullivan. The film stars Dorothy Dalton, Holmes Herbert, Philo McCullough, Dorcas Mathews, Donald McDonald, and George Williams. The film was released on September 7, 1919, by Paramount Pictures.

== Plot ==
As described in a film magazine, Helen Armes, a nurse, comes to New York City from Albany to visit her married brother. She arrives on New Year's Eve and is immediately added to a cabaret party being made up to include her brother's wife and Lyle Bane, a wealthy bachelor. At the cabaret she meets his brother Temple Bane, a woman-hater who begins to believe in her. When she wearies of the performance, Lyle takes her home, lures her into his apartment, and attempts familiarities. She escapes but is judged guilty by her sister-in-law, so she leaves at once and goes to the nurse headquarters. Temple arrives and, after being told a lie about Helen's character and the incident, fights with his brother and receives a blow that blinds him. Helen is assigned to his case and she nurses him back to his sight. Being ignorant of her identity, Temple asks Helen for her hand in marriage. When he regains his sight, he then denounces her. She is about to leave when Lyle Bane, who has been reported killed in France while in the American Expeditionary Forces, appears in a supernatural form and tells the truth about the incident in the apartment. Temple and Helen reconcile, and Lyle disappears, with it concluded that he did not return in the flesh but only as a spirit.

== Cast ==
- Dorothy Dalton as Helen Armes
- Holmes Herbert as Temple Bane
- Philo McCullough as Lyle Bane
- Dorcas Mathews as Evelyn Howell
- Donald McDonald as Herbert Howell
- George Williams as Dr. Rodney Nevins

== Preservation ==
A print of the film is held in the Gosfilmofond collection in Moscow, Russia.
