= Lucky Dan =

1922 film

- Directed by: William K. Howard
- Written by: R.C. Carton
- Produced by: Phil Goldstone
- Starring: Richard Talmadge; George A. Williams; Dorothy Wood
- Production company: Phil Goldstone Productions
- Distributed by: Phil Goldstone Productions
- Release date: November 27, 1922
- Running time: 50 minutes
- Country: United States
- Languages: Silent; English intertitles

Lucky Dan is a 1922 American silent action film directed by William K. Howard and starring Richard Talmadge, George A. Williams and Dorothy Wood.

== Cast ==
- Richard Talmadge as Lucky Dan
- George A. Williams as Father of The Girl
- Dorothy Wood as The Girl
- S.E. Jennings as Slim Connors

== Bibliography ==
- Connelly, Robert B. The Silents: Silent Feature Films, 1910-36, Volume 40, Issue 2. December Press, 1998.
- Munden, Kenneth White. The American Film Institute Catalog of Motion Pictures Produced in the United States, Part 1. University of California Press, 1997.
