= The Long Chance =

1922 film

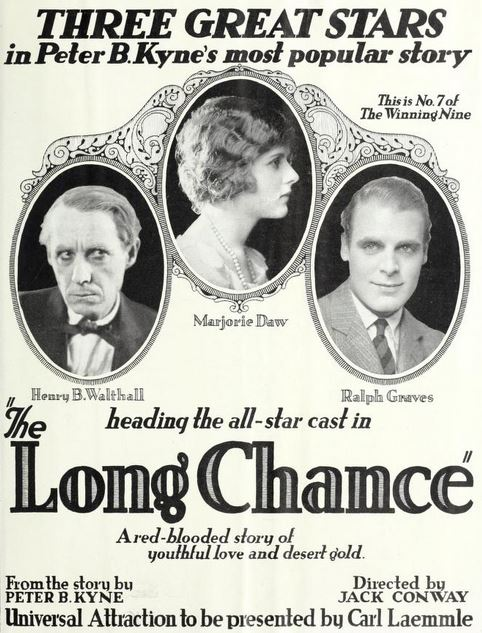
- Directed by: Jack Conway
- Written by: Peter B. Kyne (novel); Raymond L. Schrock
- Produced by: Carl Laemmle
- Starring: Henry B. Walthall; Marjorie Daw; Ralph Graves
- Cinematography: Ben F. Reynolds
- Production company: Universal Pictures
- Distributed by: Universal Pictures
- Release date: October 2, 1922
- Running time: 5 reels
- Country: United States
- Languages: Silent; English intertitles

The Long Chance is a 1922 American silent Western film directed by Jack Conway and starring Henry B. Walthall, Marjorie Daw and Ralph Graves.

== Cast ==
- Henry B. Walthall as Harley P. Hennage
- Marjorie Daw as Kate Corbaly / Dana Corbaly
- Ralph Graves as Bob McGraw
- Jack Curtis as 'Borax' O'Rourke
- Tom London as John Corbaly
- Boyd Irwin as 'Boston'
- William Bertram as Sam Singer
- Grace Marvin as Soft Wind
- George A. Williams as Dr. Taylor

== Bibliography ==
- James Robert Parish & Michael R. Pitts. Film directors: a guide to their American films. Scarecrow Press, 1974.
