= Chicago, St. Paul, Minneapolis and Omaha Railroad Car Shop Historic District =

Historic district in Wisconsin, United States

- U.S. National Register of Historic Places
- U.S. Historic district
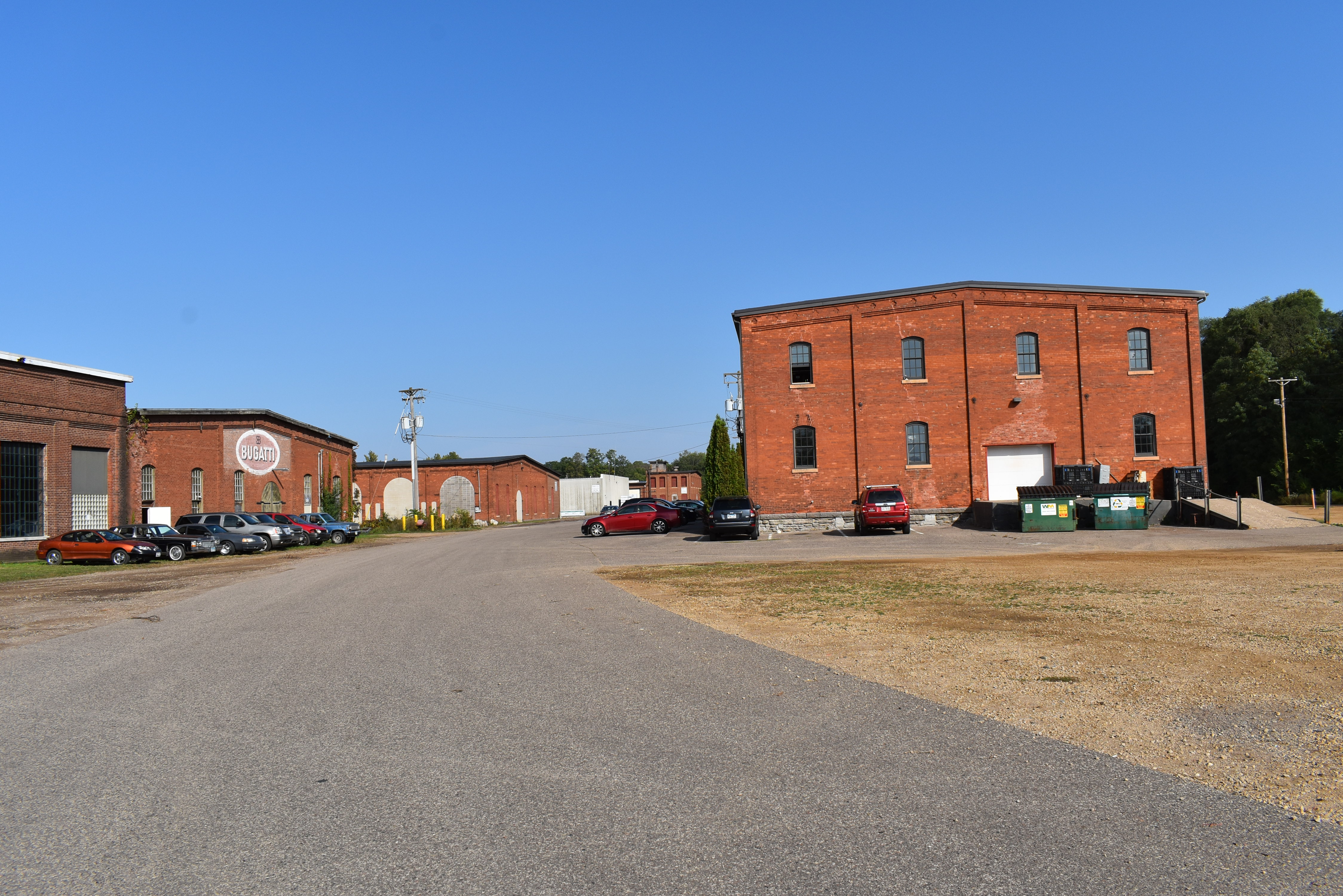
- The CStPM&O Car Shop Historic District in 2021

- Location within Wisconsin Location within the United States
- Location: Roughly bounded by Gallahad Rd., Sommer, 4th and St. Croix Sts. North Hudson, Wisconsin
- Coordinates: 44°59′43″N 92°45′38″W
- Area: 27 acres (11 ha)
- Built: 1890–1916
- Architect: Chicago, St. Paul, Minneapolis and Omaha Railway
- NRHP reference No.: 84000072
- Added to NRHP: October 4, 1984

The Chicago, St. Paul, Minneapolis and Omaha Railroad Car Shop Historic District, located in the oldest part of North Hudson, Wisconsin, is a set of buildings built by the Chicago, St. Paul, Minneapolis and Omaha Railway (CStPM&O or Omaha Road). In 1984 the complex was added to the National Register of Historic Places.

Logging grew in the St. Croix valley during the late 1800s. In early years, the only way to get the product out was by floating logs down the river, which tied that transportation to the spring floods. When the West Wisconsin Railroad arrived in Hudson in 1871, it opened up efficient overland transportation and a longer logging season, which helped expand the local lumber industry into a boom.

These were boom years for railroads too, and the West Wisconsin grew for a while. In 1872 it moved its car repair and construction shops from Eau Claire to North Hudson, building a set of new shops on the north shore of Lake Mallileau, just south of this district. In 1874 it added a line from North Hudson to Lake Superior at Ashland and Bayfield. In following years West Wisconsin absorbed a Hudson-River Falls company and the St. Paul, Stillwater, and Taylor's Falls railroad. But in 1878 it went bankrupt and was itself absorbed into the Chicago, St. Paul, Minneapolis and Omaha Railway.

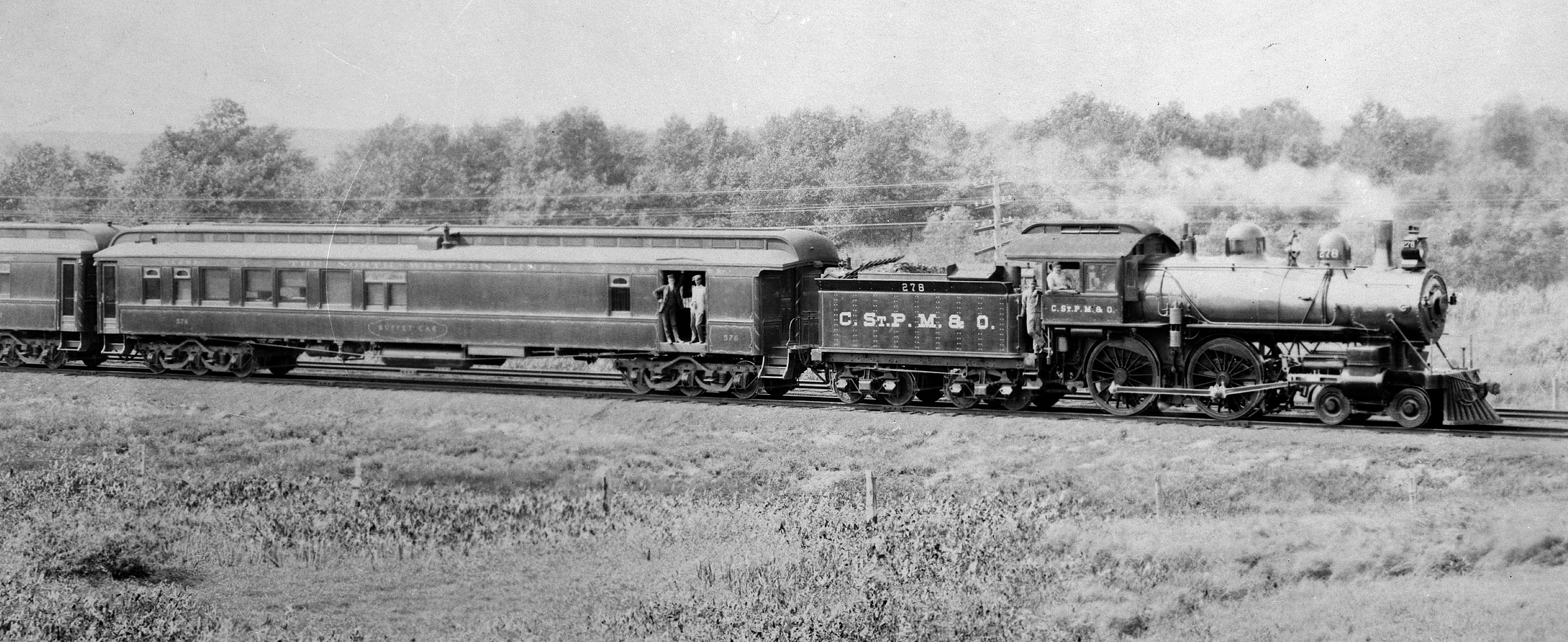
Omaha 4-4-0 locomotive #278

The shops the West Wisconsin Railway had built in North Hudson burned in a series of fires in the late 1880s. The Omaha considered rebuilding them in other towns, but settled on rebuilding just north of the buildings that had burned. "Between 1890 and 1891, six large red brick industrial buildings, a wood dry kiln, and a small brick oil house were erected.... The shop buildings were very specialized and primarily single story structures; a wood machine shop and engine room, blacksmith and iron machine shop, passenger and freight car 'erecting' shops, a paint shop, and a two story storage/office building. Large arched doors were placed in every bay on the south side and generally on the north side of major buildings. These doors expedited the conveyance of railroad cars from one structure to another." The large buildings had 16-inch brick walls, 25-foot ceilings, pilastered walls, and cruciform brickwork in their cornices, with light and ventilation provided by big windows and monitor windows above.

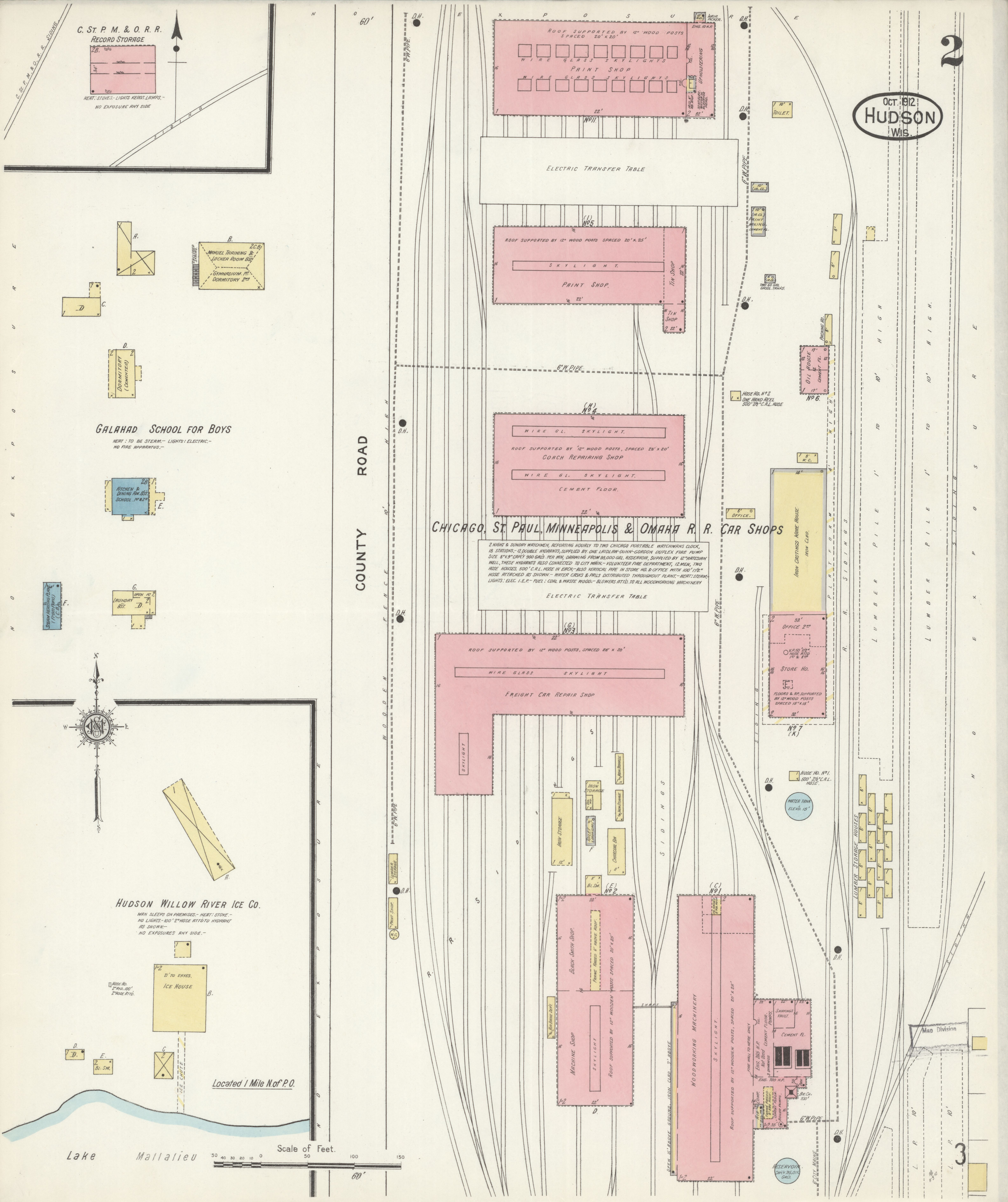
The October 1912 Sanborn map of the shops

A paint and upholstery shop and a wood machine shop were added around 1904. In 1916 a major expansion occurred, adding a machine shop, a wheel shop, and a handcar repair shop. The power for all buildings was converted from steam to electricity. A water closet was also added for workers.

160 men were employed in the new shops when they opened, with a goal of 500 to 700 workers. The Omaha line built its own rail cars, which was unusual. Along with new construction, the shops performed ongoing overhauls and repairs of their rolling stock. Hours were long and pay was low, with starting pay around 14 cents per hour. The paints carried a risk of lead poisoning, working with heavy machinery brought other risks, and there were no sick or vacation days, or unemployment compensation. In 1907 the workers struck for a 10% pay increase. 150 men walked out, claiming that Hudson paid the lowest wages of the Omaha's shops. Omaha agreed, and the men were back at work after a day and a half. Another strike in 1925 was more divisive, but the union grew stronger and eventually won shorter hours, vacation, and insurance.

But railroads declined with the rise of the automobile and trucking. The Omaha's business faltered in the 1930s during the Great Depression and passenger service stopped in the 1950s. In 1957, despite resistance from the Hudson community, the Omaha line closed the shops in Hudson, consolidating maintenance to their other shop in Clinton, Iowa.

The Omaha line was a major employer in North Hudson for almost eighty years. In the early years, the railroad also served as Hudson's connection to the outside world. The original passenger depot in North Hudson has been destroyed, but these shop buildings are still fairly intact, and tell a story about the history of railroading that isn't present in many communities. Given all this, the shops were listed on the National Register of Historic Places in 1984 and the Wisconsin State Register of Historic Places in 1989.
