= The Fire Eater =

1921 film

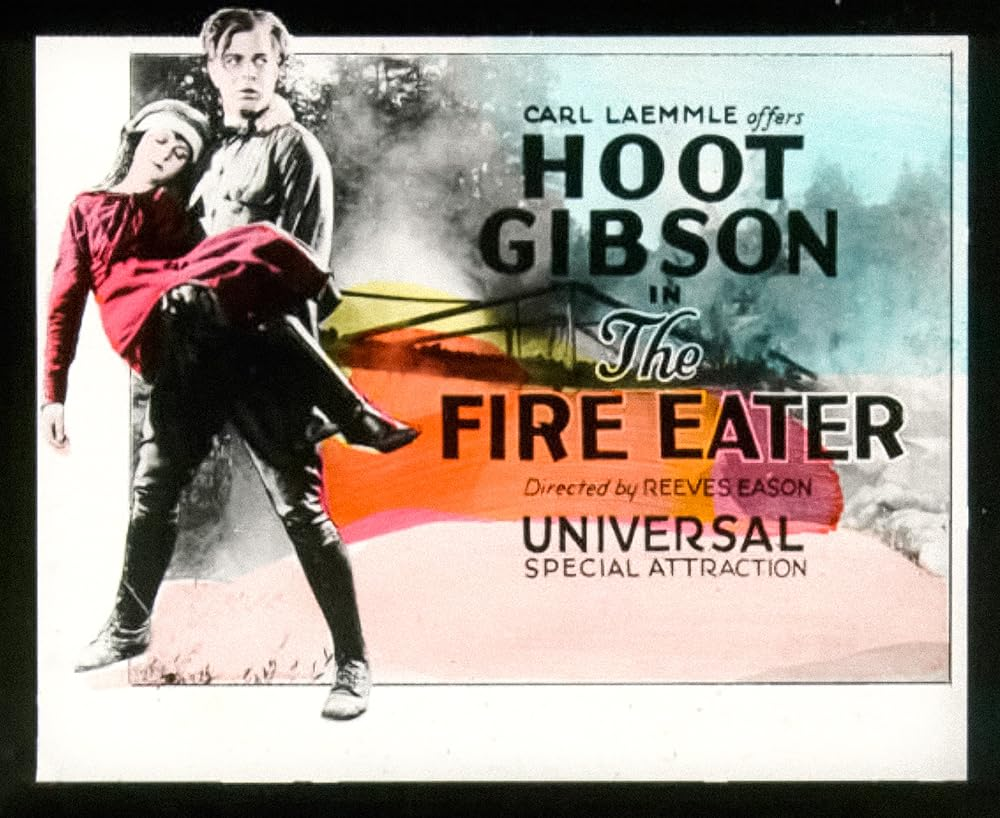
- Directed by: B. Reeves Eason
- Written by: Harvey Gates
- Based on: "The Badge of Fighting Hearts" by Ralph Cummins
- Starring: Hoot Gibson
- Cinematography: Alfred H. Lathem
- Distributed by: Universal Pictures
- Release date: December 24, 1921
- Running time: 50 minutes
- Country: United States
- Languages: Silent; English intertitles

The Fire Eater is a 1921 American silent Western film directed by B. Reeves Eason and featuring Hoot Gibson.

== Plot ==
As described in a film magazine, Smilin' Bob Corey and his partner Jim O'Neil are rangers employed by the Forestry Preserve Bureau who are directed to make a "peaceful penetration" into Paradise Valley to save timber from the depredations of Jacob Lemar, a notorious lumber thief, and the uneducated settlers who are robbing the mountains and valleys of all of the best trees. This makes them the objects of hatred in the camp. Bob falls in love with Martha McCarthy, the daughter of woodsman Day McCarthy, who receive Bob and Jim into their home even though they distrust them. After several fights between Bob and Jacob and a spectacular forest fire that sweeps the mountainside, Jacob kidnaps Martha hides her in a bear trap. Bob rescues her and they escape the flames by hiding in a waterhole. Jacob is caught and punished for his part in the kidnapping, and the woodsmen accept Bob and Jim as good fellows on an earnest mission.

== Cast ==
- Hoot Gibson as Bob Corey
- Louise Lorraine as Martha McCarthy
- Walter Perry as Jim O'Neil
- Thomas G. Lingham as Jacob Lemar (credited as Tom Lingham)
- Fred Lancaster as Wolf Roselli
- Carmen Phillips as Marie Roselli
- George Berrell as Day McCarthy
- Bradley Ward as Marty Frame (credited as W. Bradley Ward)
- George A. Williams as Mort Frame

== Preservation ==
With no holdings located in archives, The Fire Eater is considered a lost film.

== See also ==
- List of American films of 1921
- Hoot Gibson filmography
