= Dwelley =

Dwelley is a surname. Notable people with the surname include:

- Charles Dwelley (1908–1993), American community activist and newspaper owner
- Ross Dwelley (born 1995), American football player

== See also ==
- William Dwelley House, a historic house in Hudson, Wisconsin, US
