= Super Speed (1925 film) =

1925 film directed by Al Rogell

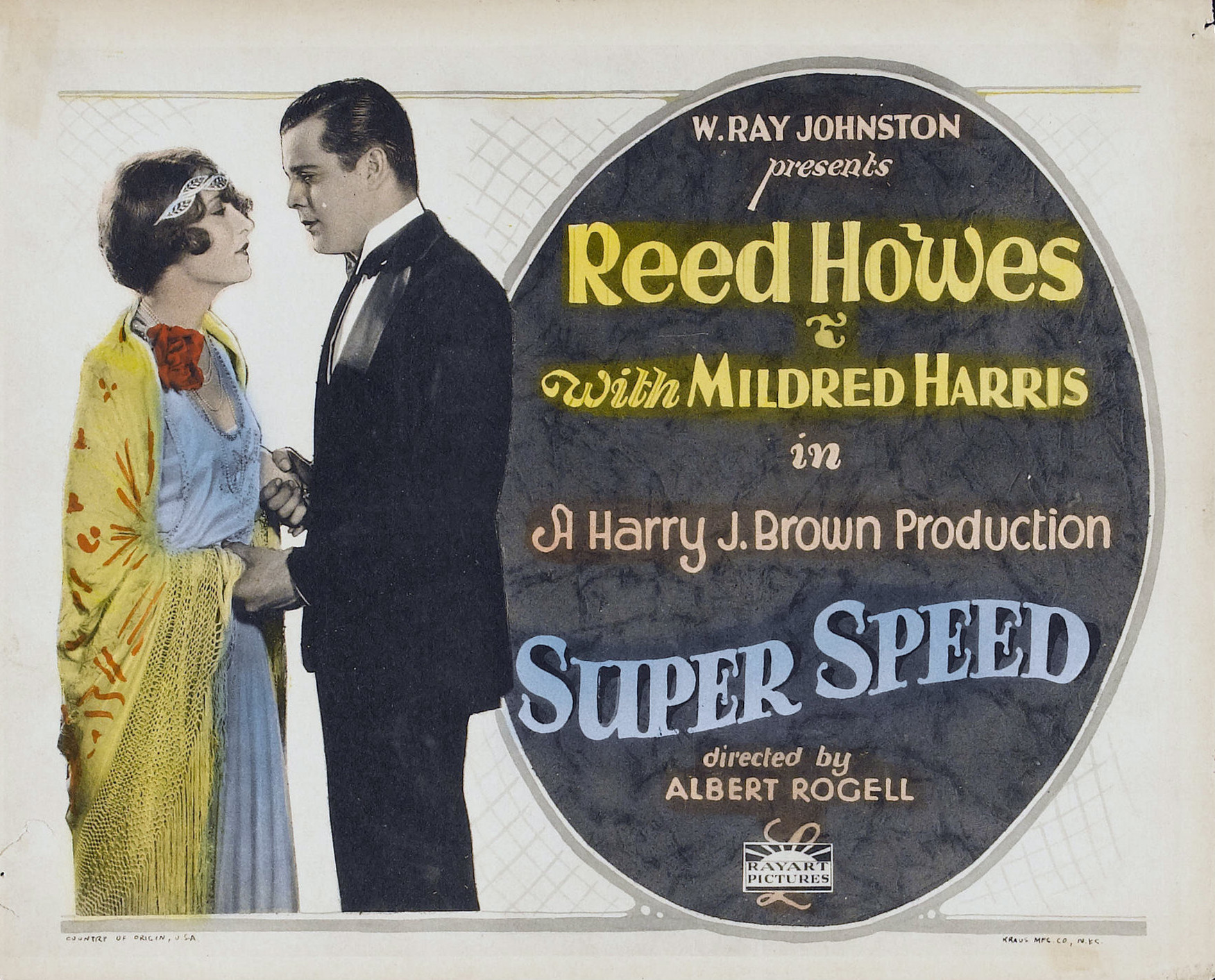
- Lobby card
- Directed by: Al Rogell
- Written by: J. W. Grey (story); Henry Roberts Symonds (aka J.W. Grey) (story)
- Produced by: Harry Joe Brown
- Starring: Reed Howes; Mildred Harris
- Production company: Harry J. Brown Productions
- Distributed by: Rayart Pictures
- Release date: April 2, 1925
- Running time: 5 reels
- Country: United States
- Language: Silent (English intertitles)

Super Speed is a 1925 American silent comedy film directed by Al Rogell and starring Reed Howes and Mildred Harris.

== Plot ==
As described in a review in a film magazine, working as a driver for his uncle who owns a big milk company, Pat O'Farrell saves Claire Knight from some thugs, and it is a case of love at first sight. Pat finds that crooked lawyer Stanton Wade plans to steal an invention, a supercharger from his old friend Dad Perkins and manages to get it after a running fight and chase over the rooftops with Wade's henchmen. 0claire, still believing him to be a milkman, invites him to a party. He comes all dressed up and tells her the truth. She confides that her father is deeply in debt to Wade. Pat sees a chance to win, and equips one of the cars, a Knight Hawk manufactured by Claire's father, with the supercharger and drive it in the race. Wade's thugs capture him, but he gets away in time and wins the race. Rushing to Wade's office, he arrives in time to prevent the company being signed over to Wade. Incidentally, he also wins the young woman.

== Cast ==
- Reed Howes as Pat O'Farrell
- Mildred Harris as Claire Knight
- Charles Clary as Warner Knight
- Sheldon Lewis as Stanton Wade
- George A. Williams as Dad Perkins (credited as George Williams)
- Martin Turner as Zeke, Pat's Valet

== Preservation ==
A print of Super Speed is located at the Library of Congress.
