= Kinnickinnic Church =

Historic church in Wisconsin, United States

- U.S. National Register of Historic Places
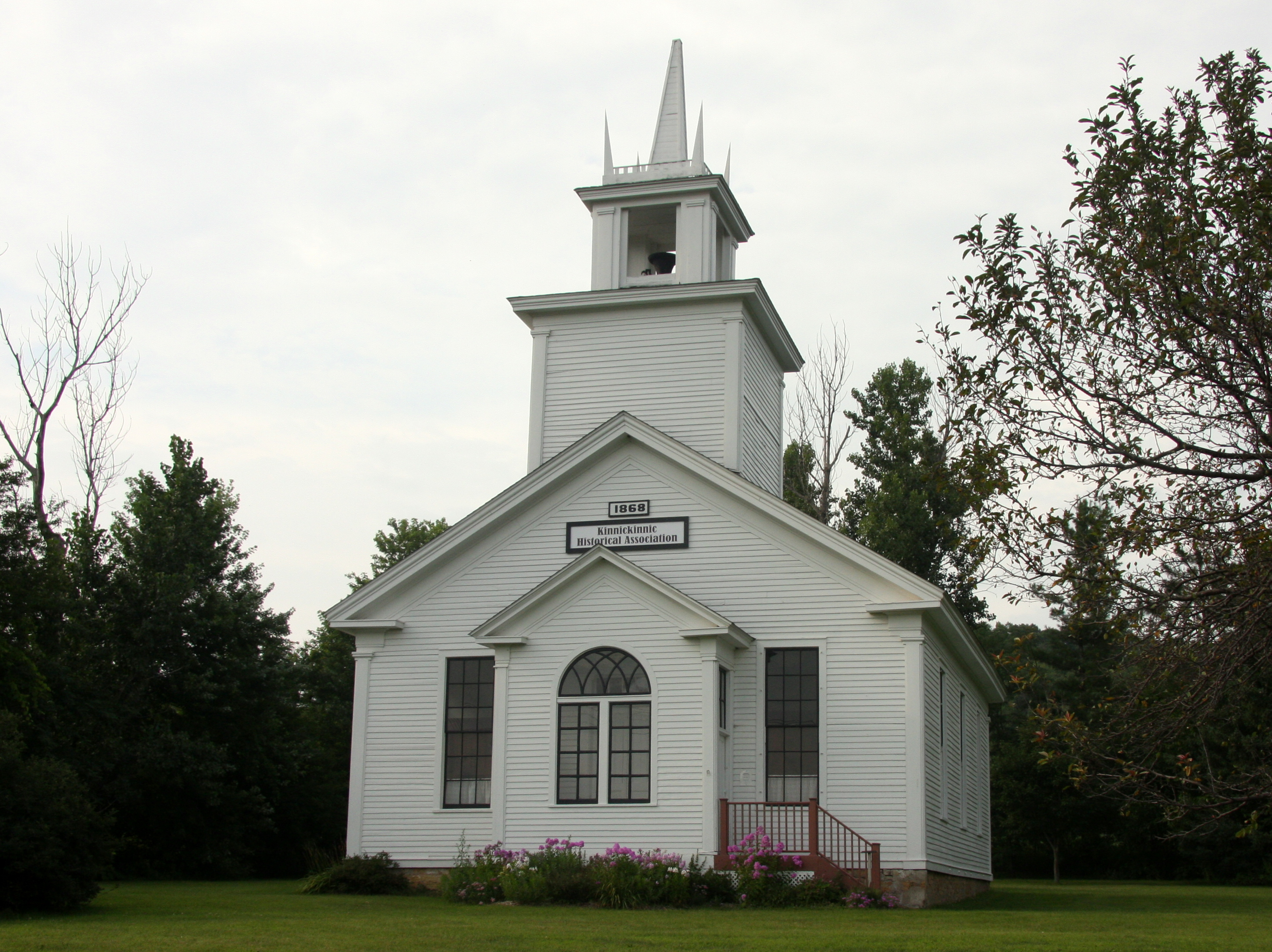
- The building in 2014

- Location within Wisconsin Location within the United States
- Location: WI J, jct. with WI JJ, Kinnickinnic, Wisconsin
- Coordinates: 44°54′49″N 92°32′37″W
- Area: 1.3 acres (0.53 ha)
- Built: 1868
- Architect: Kimball, Mr.
- Architectural style: Greek Revival
- NRHP reference No.: 00001190
- Added to NRHP: October 6, 2000

The Kinnickinnic Church is a historic church in Kinnickinnic, Wisconsin, United States. The Greek Revival church was constructed for $2,000 in 1868 and was originally shared by a Methodist and a Congregationalist congregation. In 1895, the Congregationalists purchased the church for $300; it maintained a congregation there until 1951. In 1962, the Kinnickinnic Historical Association bought the vacant church to prevent it from being converted to a home. The church, which contains a historic pump organ, is currently used for social events in the community. On October 6, 2000, the church was added to the National Register of Historic Places.
