= Westside, Georgia =

Unincorporated community in the state of Georgia

Coordinates: 34°57′29″N 85°13′24″W

Westside is an unincorporated community in Catoosa County, in the U.S. state of Georgia.

== Etymology ==
Westside was named due to its location in the western part of Catoosa County.
