= Joseph Mielke House =

Historic house in Wisconsin, United States

- U.S. National Register of Historic Places
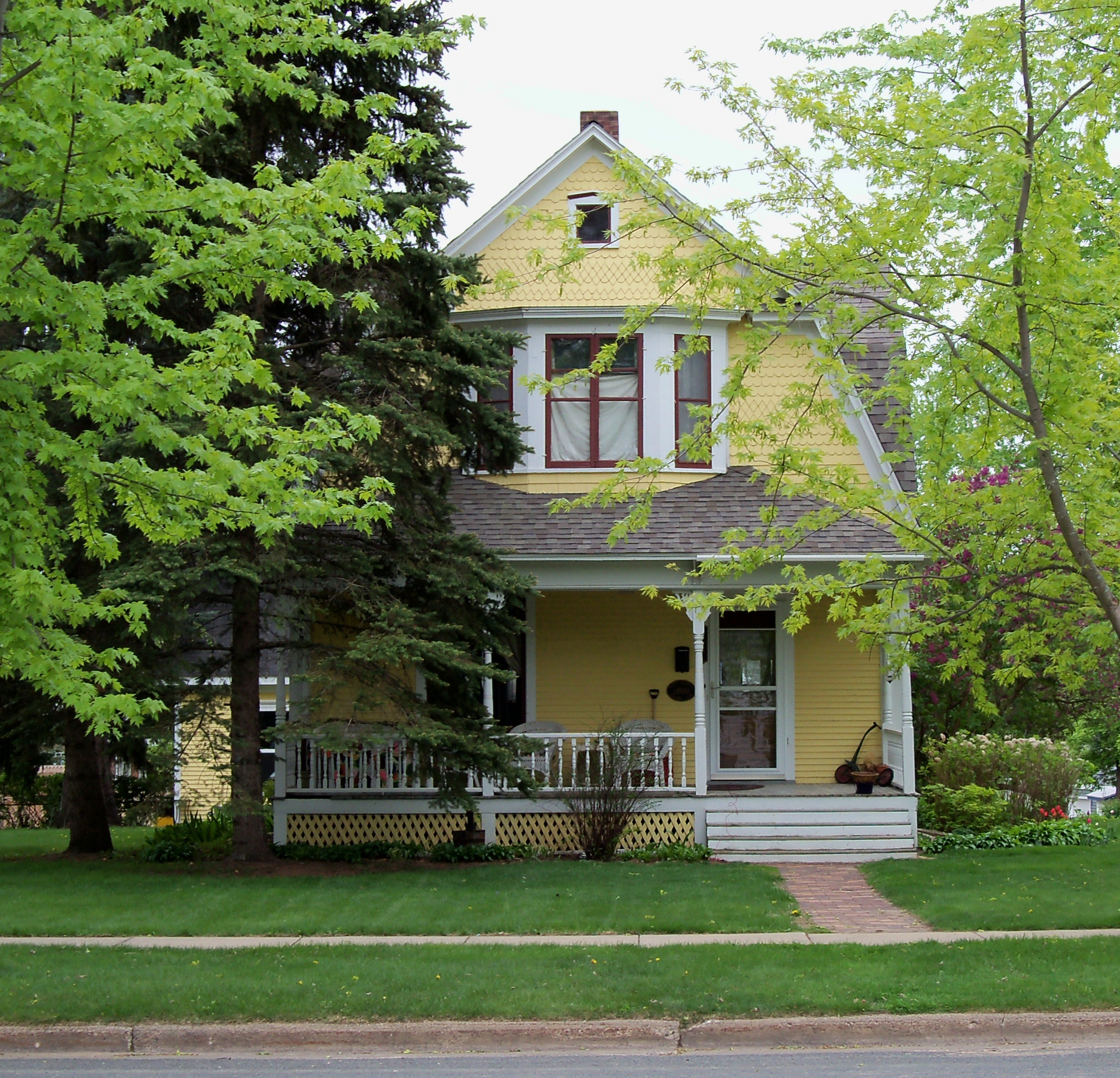
- Location: 326 Second St., New Richmond, Wisconsin
- Coordinates: 45.12136°N 92.54142°W
- Area: less than one acre
- Built: c. 1906
- Architectural style: Dutch Colonial Revival
- NRHP reference No.: 88000621
- Added to NRHP: May 31, 1988

The Joseph Mielke House is a historic house in New Richmond, Wisconsin, United States. It was added to the National Register of Historic Places in 1988.

It is a one-and-a-half-story Dutch Colonial Revival-style house clad with clapboard.

Its hipped roof one car garage, on the alley, is a second contributing building.
