= William J. Bernd House (Arch Avenue, New Richmond, Wisconsin) =

Historic house in Wisconsin, United States

- U.S. National Register of Historic Places
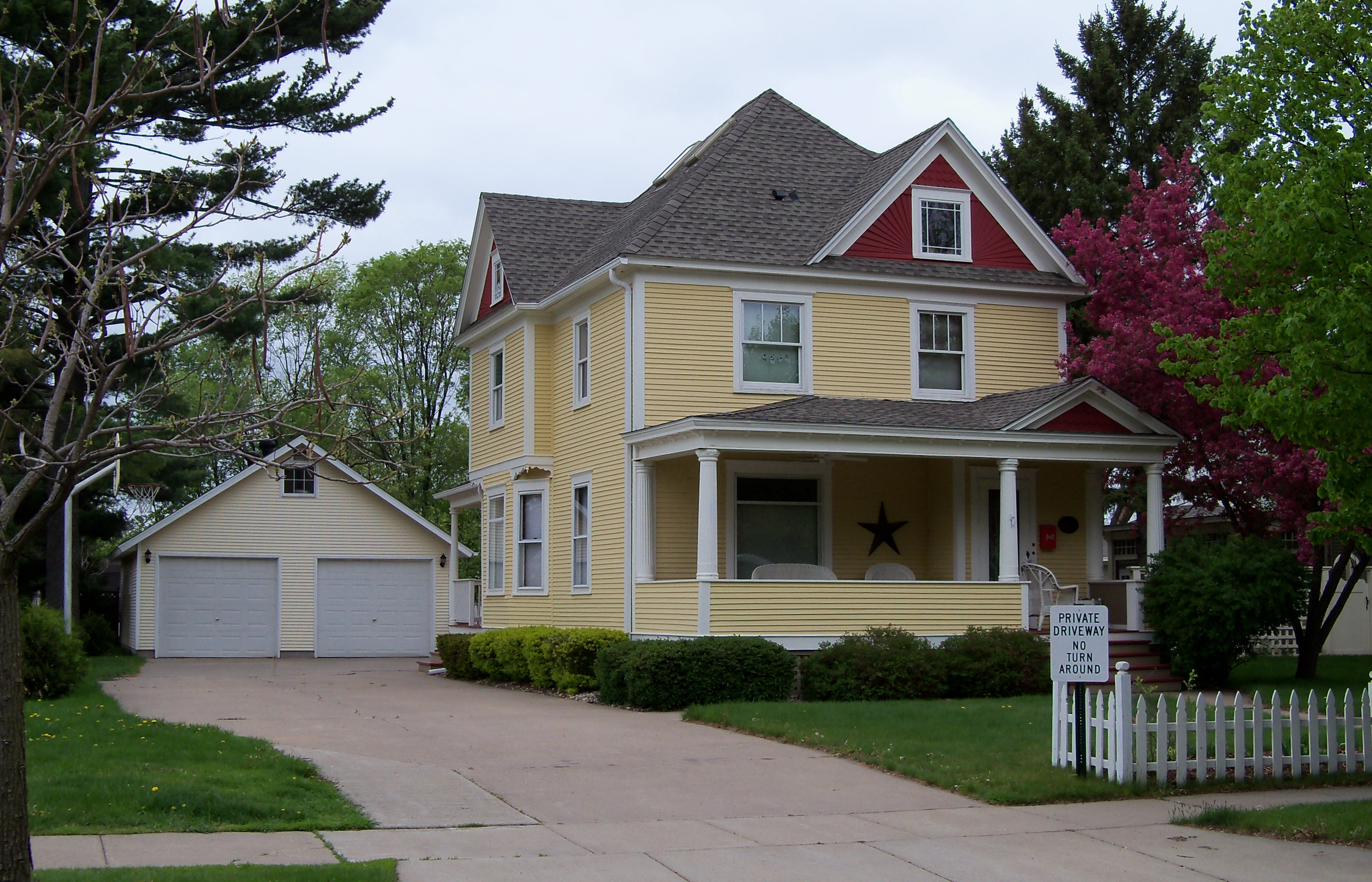
- William J. Bernd House

- Location within Wisconsin Location within the United States
- Location: 143 Arch Ave., N. New Richmond, Wisconsin
- Coordinates: 45°07′25″N 92°32′09″W
- Area: less than one acre
- Built: 1907
- Architectural style: Queen Anne
- MPS: New Richmond MRA
- NRHP reference No.: 88000616
- Added to NRHP: May 31, 1988

The William J. Bernd House is located in New Richmond, Wisconsin, United States. It is one of two houses sharing the name in New Richmond. The house was added to the National Register of Historic Places in 1988.

The exterior of this two-story clapboard house was then essentially original, in a patternbook Queen Anne style.

It has dormers in its roof and a full one-story front porch with Doric capitals upon its columns, and lattice work at its foundation.

== See also ==
- William J. Bernd House (Second Street, New Richmond, Wisconsin)
