= West Side Line (disambiguation) =

The West Side Line is a railroad line in Manhattan, New York City.

West Side Line may also refer to:

- West Side Line (California), a Southern Pacific railroad line built in the 1890s, now the San Joaquin Valley Railroad
- West Side line (Oregon), built in the 1860s, later also owned by the Southern Pacific
- The IRT West Side Line, a New York City Subway line
- West Side Line, a streetcar line in Cleveland, Ohio, US
