= New Richmond News Building =

- U.S. National Register of Historic Places
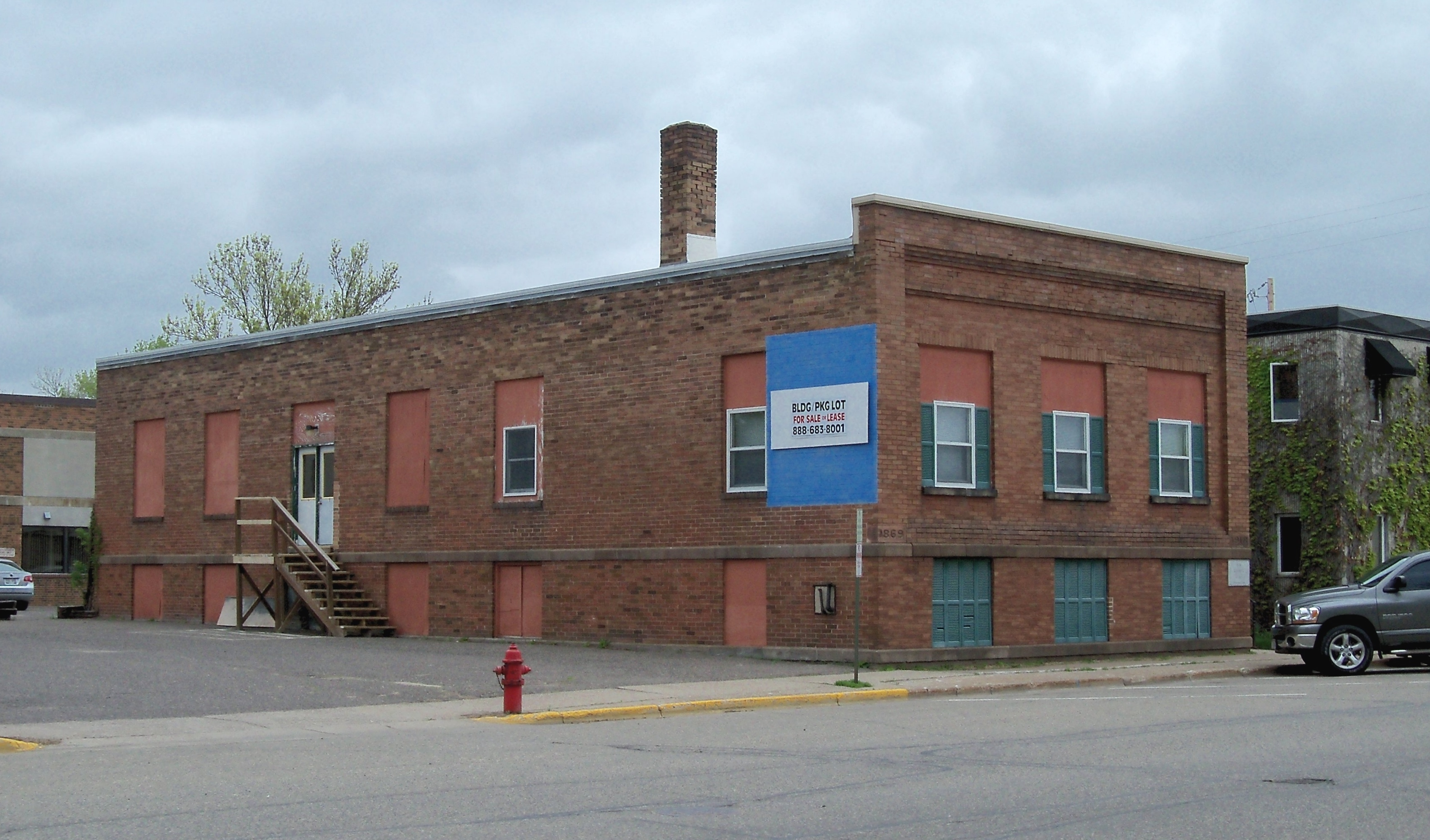
- New Richmond News Building

- Location within Wisconsin Location within the United States
- Location: 145 Second St., West; New Richmond, Wisconsin
- Coordinates: 45°07′18″N 92°32′19″W
- Area: less than one acre
- Built: 1913
- Built by: Traiser & Barrett
- MPS: New Richmond MRA
- NRHP reference No.: 88000625
- Added to NRHP: May 31, 1988

The New Richmond News Building is a historic building located at 154 Second Street in New Richmond, Wisconsin. It was built in 1913, and was added to the National Register of Historic Places in 1988.

It is a two-story red brick building that is 32 by 82 feet (9.8 m × 25.0 m).
