= Kinnickinnic, Wisconsin =

- Town
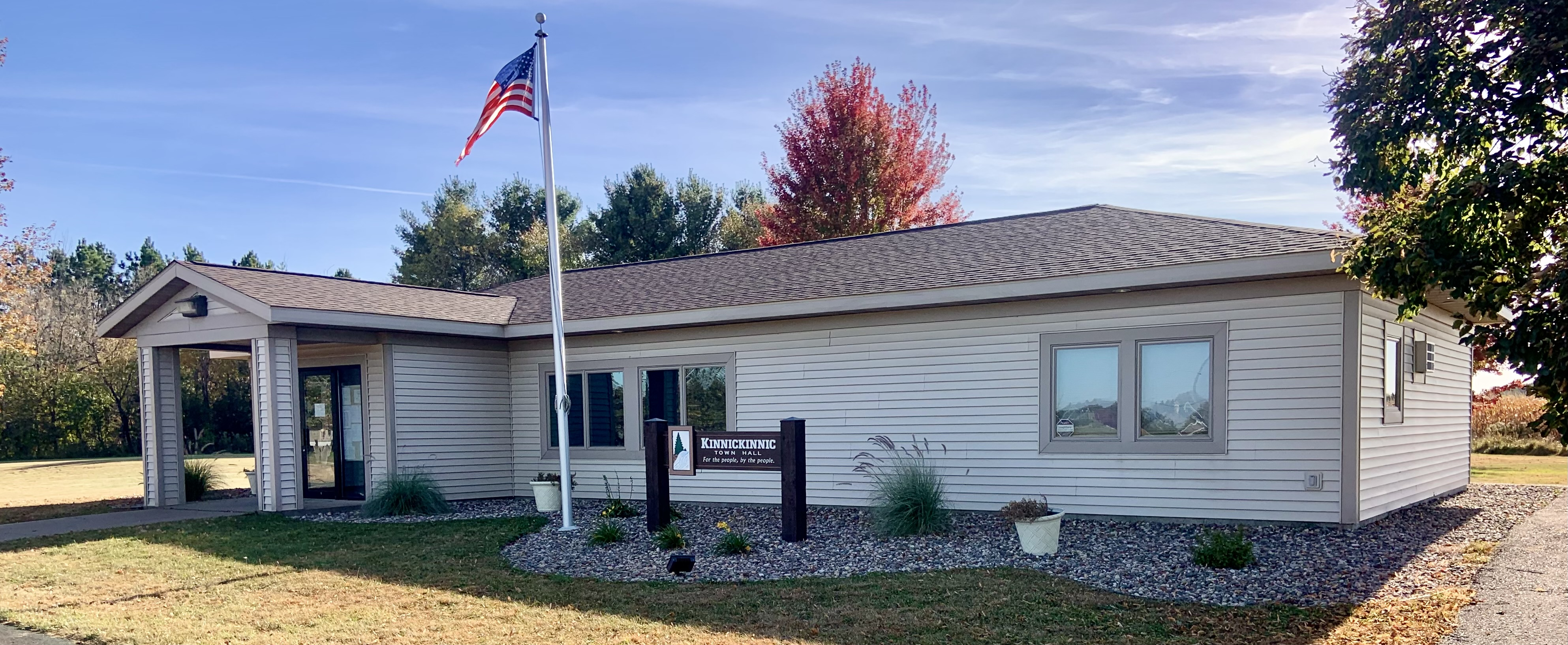
- Town hall

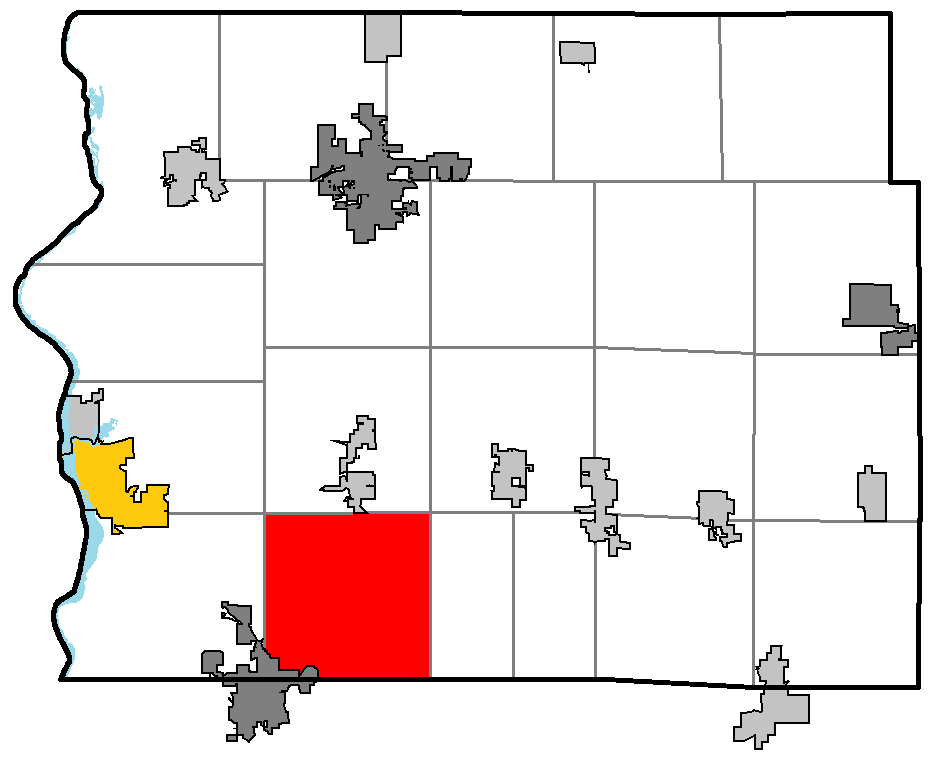
- Location of Kinnickinnic, within St. Croix County

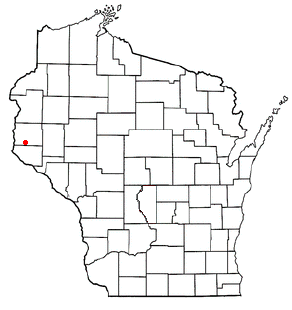
- Location of Kinnickinnic, Wisconsin
- Coordinates: 44°54′33″N 92°33′4″W
- Country: United States
- State: Wisconsin
- County: St. Croix

Area
  - Total: 35.4 sq mi (91.8 km^{2})
  - Land: 35.4 sq mi (91.8 km^{2})
  - Water: 0 sq mi (0.0 km^{2})
- Elevation: 938 ft (286 m)

Population (2020)
  - Total: 1,815
  - Density: 51.2/sq mi (19.8/km^{2})
- Time zone: UTC-6 (Central (CST))
  - Summer (DST): UTC-5 (CDT)
- Area codes: 715 & 534
- FIPS code: 55-39825
- GNIS feature ID: 1583486

Kinnickinnic (/kɪˈnɪkɪnɪk/ kih-NIK-ih-nik) is a town in St. Croix County, Wisconsin, United States. The population was 1,815 at the 2020 census.

== History ==
The word kinnickinnic is Chippewa and Cree dialects of the Algonquian language in origin. It literally means "what is mixed," when referring to the mixing of indigenous plants and tobaccos.

== Geography ==
According to the United States Census Bureau, the town has a total area of 35.4 square miles (91.8 km^{2}), all land.

== Demographics ==
Historical population
Census	Pop.	Note	%±
2010	1,722		—
2020	1,815		5.4%

As of the census of 2000, there were 1,400 people, 483 households, and 396 families residing in the town. The population density was 39.5 inhabitants per square mile (15.3/km^{2}). There were 492 housing units at an average density of 13.9 per square mile (5.4/km^{2}). The racial makeup of the town was 98.43% White, 0.64% African American, 0.07% Asian, 0.14% from other races, and 0.71% from two or more races. Hispanic or Latino of any race were 0.14% of the population.

There were 483 households, out of which 41.0% had children under the age of 18 living with them, 76.4% were married couples living together, 3.5% had a female householder with no husband present, and 18.0% were non-families. 14.7% of all households were made up of individuals, and 4.1% had someone living alone who was 65 years of age or older. The average household size was 2.90 and the average family size was 3.23.

In the town, the population was spread out, with 29.2% under the age of 18, 7.2% from 18 to 24, 28.5% from 25 to 44, 27.7% from 45 to 64, and 7.4% who were 65 years of age or older. The median age was 37 years. For every 100 females, there were 98.3 males. For every 100 females age 18 and over, there were 99.8 males.

The median income for a household in the town was $62,727, and the median income for a family was $71,354. Males had a median income of $47,375 versus $34,583 for females. The per capita income for the town was $23,665. About 2.2% of families and 3.6% of the population were below the poverty line, including 2.9% of those under age 18 and 11.7% of those age 65 or over.

== Notable people ==
- Charles Loring, Chief Justice of the Minnesota Supreme Court, was born in Kinnickinnic
- George A. Williams, actor, was born in Kinnickinnic

== Buildings and structures ==
- Kinnickinnic Church
