= Erick J. Thompson House =

Historic house in Wisconsin, United States

- U.S. National Register of Historic Places
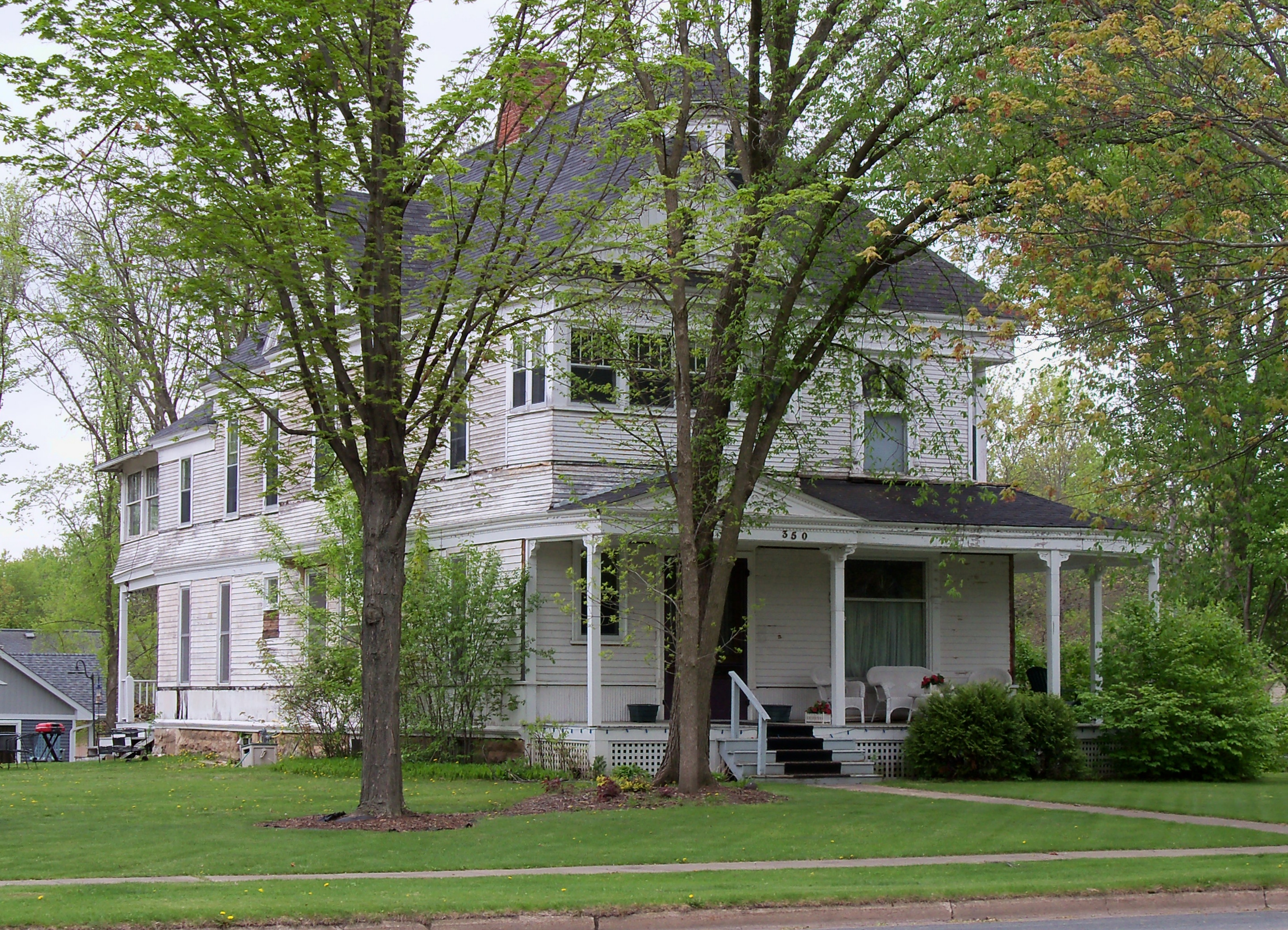
- Erick J. Thompson House

- Location within Wisconsin Location within the United States
- Location: 350 Second St., W. New Richmond, Wisconsin
- Coordinates: 45°07′17″N 92°32′29″W
- Area: less than one acre
- Built: 1894
- Architectural style: Queen Anne
- MPS: New Richmond MRA
- NRHP reference No.: 88000624
- Added to NRHP: May 31, 1988

The Erick J. Thompson House is located in New Richmond, Wisconsin, United States. It was added to the National Register of Historic Places in 1988.

It is a two-and-a-half-story Queen Anne-style house on a rusticated stone block foundation.

It was deemed notable as "an excellent local example of the [Queen Anne] style in New Richmond. The ornamental woodwork, turret dormer, bay windows and wrap around porch all combine to give a visual tour-de-force and make this house the most elaborate example of the Queen Anne in town, on both the interior and exterior."
