= Westside, California =

Westside, California may refer to:

- Westside (Los Angeles County)
- Westside, Fresno County, California
- Westside, Long Beach, California, a neighborhood
- West Side (San Francisco)
