= West Side Highway (disambiguation) =

The West Side Highway is a major road in New York City.

West Side Highway may also refer to:

- West Side Elevated Highway, a former elevated highway in New York City
- West Side Highway, Washington, an unincorporated place in Cowlitz County, Washington, US
- West Side Highway (Oregon) or Oregon Route 99W
- The segment of California State Route 33 in the San Joaquin Valley
- West Side Freeway, a segment of Interstate 5 in California's San Joaquin Valley, known as West Side Highway (California).
- West Side Highway (EP), the second eponymously titled extended play by the American punk rock band Pinhead Gunpowder
