= Charles Loring (judge) =

American judge

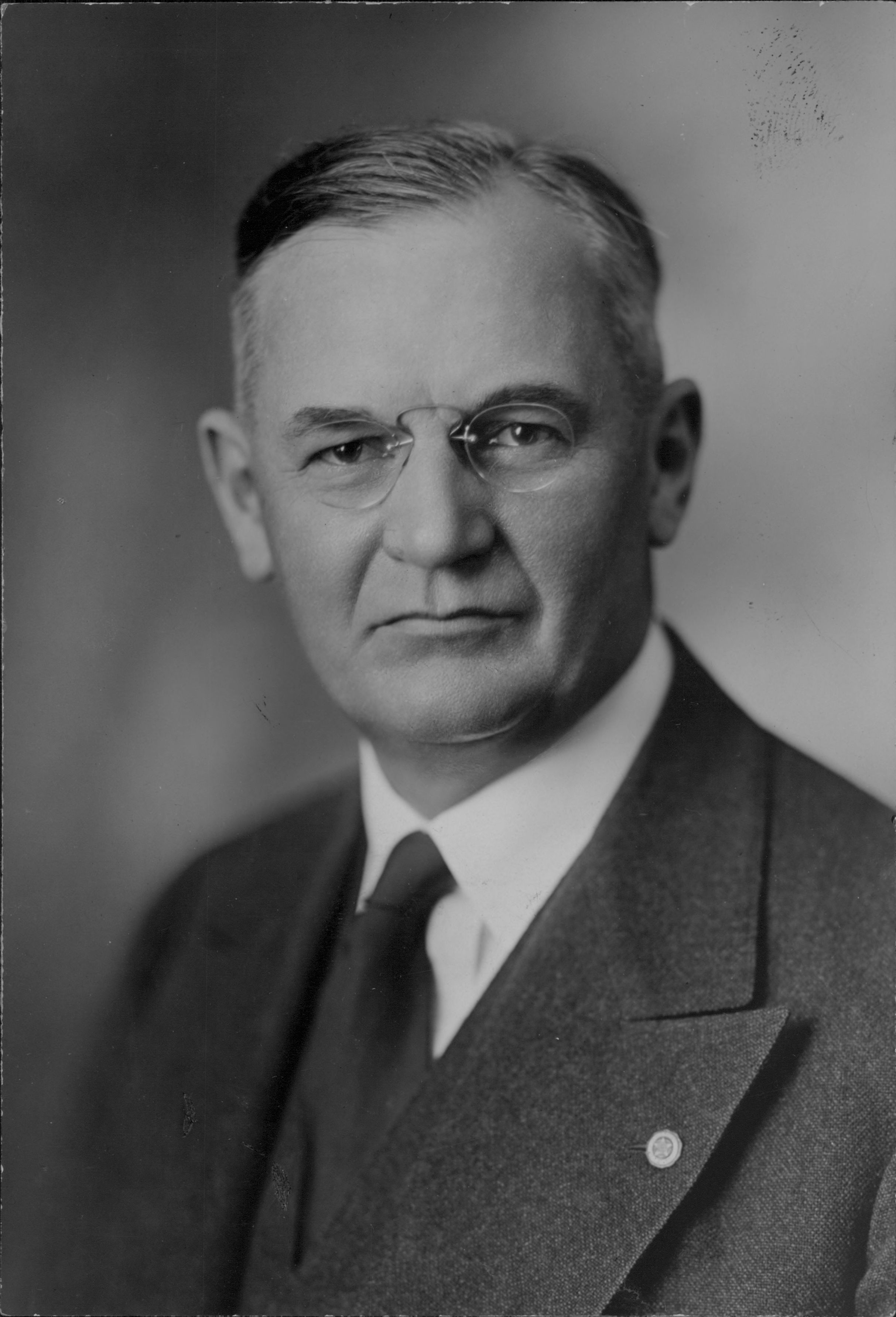
Charles Loring

Charles Loring (November 26, 1873 – March 7, 1961) was an American lawyer and judge from Minnesota. He served as Chief Justice of the Minnesota Supreme Court from January 1944 to July 1953.

== Early life and education ==
The only child of Lyman Loring and Eugenie Hutchinson and sixth great grandson of Massachusetts pioneer Thomas Loring, Charles was born on a farm in the town of Kinnickinnic, St. Croix County, Wisconsin, and moved to Clay County, Minnesota in 1877. He studied at Phillips Exeter Academy, State Normal School at Moorhead, Minnesota, and University of Minnesota Law School.

== Career ==
During World War I he served as Major Judge Advocate in U.S. Army and Lt. Col. Judge Advocate in regular army. He served as Chief Justice of the Minnesota Supreme Court from January 1944 to July 1953.
