= William H. Phipps House =

Historic house in Wisconsin, United States

- U.S. National Register of Historic Places
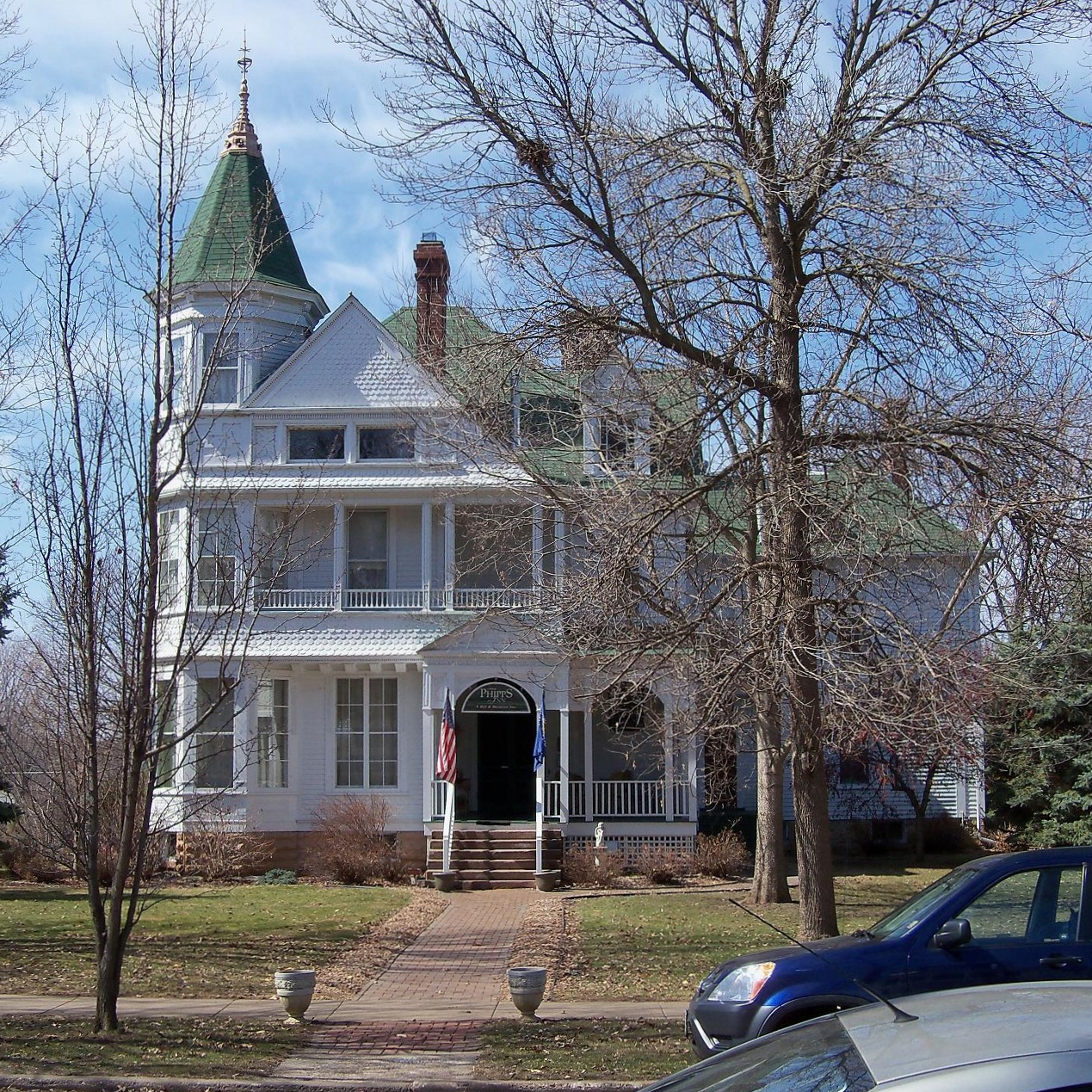

- Location within Wisconsin Location within the United States
- Location: 1005 Third St. Hudson, Wisconsin
- Coordinates: 44°58′50″N 92°45′22″W
- Area: less than one acre
- Built: 1884
- Architectural style: Queen Anne
- NRHP reference No.: 87000991
- Added to NRHP: June 18, 1987

The William H. Phipps House is a historic house located in Hudson, Wisconsin. It was added to the National Register of Historic Places on June 18, 1987.

Its NRHP nomination states:

The William H. Phipps house epitomizes fanciful Queen Anne architecture with its octagonal tower, multiple verandahs and balconies and exterior facade ornamentation using octagonal shingles and various applied wood detail. The interior complements the architectural quality using hardwoods, often carved in the minutest detail. The elegant Queen Anne style home built in 1884, is one of the showplaces in Hudson and continues to be one of the finest examples of the style of architecture to be found in the St. Croix Valley.

As of 2018, it serves as Phipps Inn Bed & Breakfast.
