= New Richmond West Side Historic District =

Historic district in Wisconsin, United States

- U.S. National Register of Historic Places
- U.S. Historic district
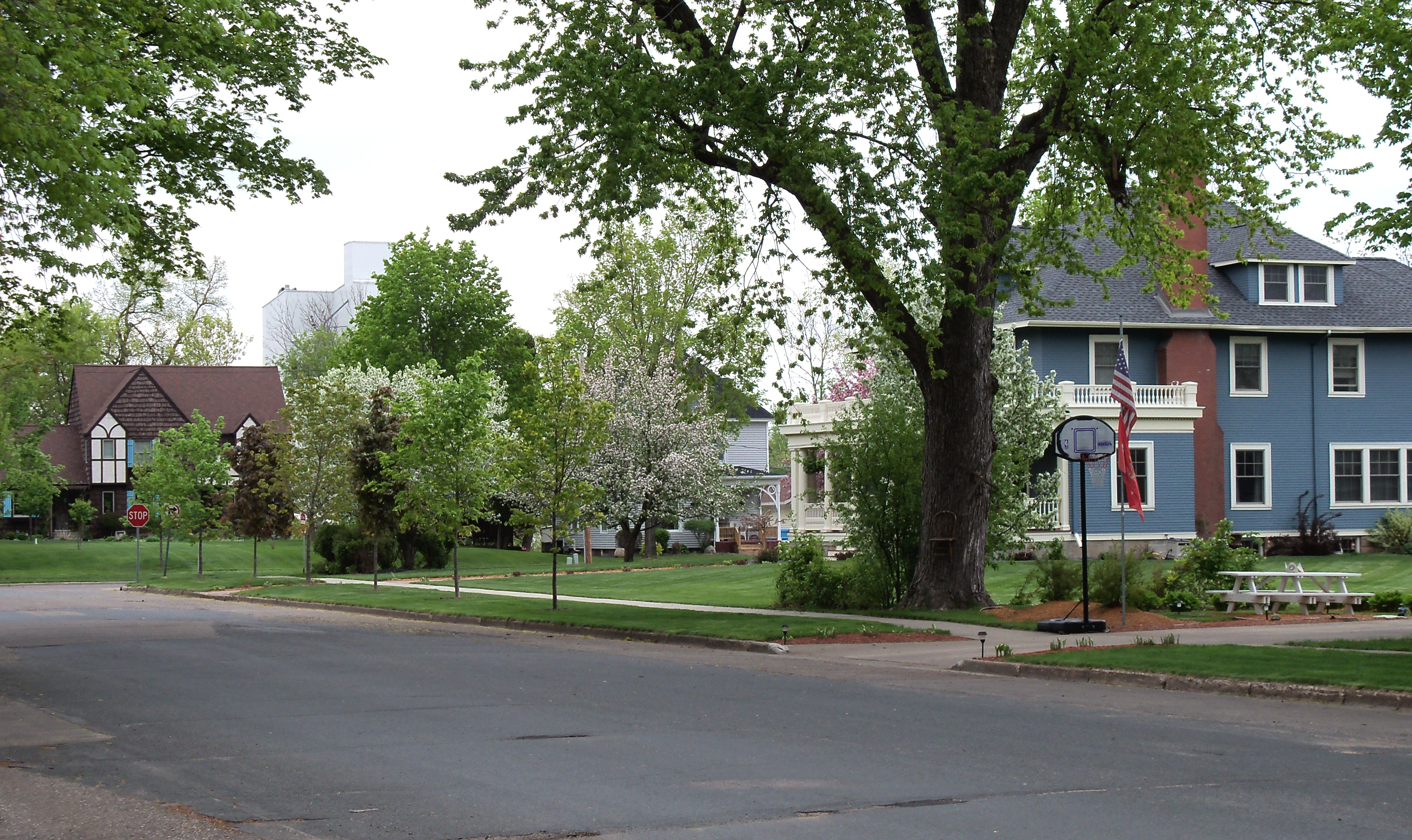
- Based on its description, perhaps 251 Second West St.?, in 2010

- Location within Wisconsin Location within the United States
- Location: Roughly bounded by Willow River, Minnesota Ave., W. Second St., S. Washington Ave., New Richmond, Wisconsin
- Coordinates: 45.122429°N 92.543387°W
- Area: 29 acres (12 ha)
- Architect: Multiple
- Architectural style: Late 19th and 20th Century Revivals, Late Victorian
- MPS: New Richmond MRA
- NRHP reference No.: 88000626
- Added to NRHP: May 31, 1988

The New Richmond West Side Historic District is a 29 acres (12 ha) historic district in New Richmond, Wisconsin. It was added to the National Register of Historic Places in 1988 and then included 28 contributing buildings. The district is roughly bounded by the Willow River, Minnesota Ave., W. Second St., and S. Washington Ave.

The district is south of the Willow River and is in the city's first ward.

The district included 17 homes built from 1870 to 1911, one built in 1929–30, and 10 carriage houses or garages.

The most notable among these may be the Doar House (1929–30), Colonial Revival, designed by Roy Childs Jones, head of the school of architecture at University of Minnesota Or the Mosher House (1887), Shingle style restrained Queen Anne house, designed by Cass Gilbert and James Knox Taylor

These are:

- Mosher House (1887), 111 Dakota Avenue South, Shingle style restrained Queen Anne house, designed by Cass Gilbert and James Knox Taylor
- McNally House (1911), 112 Dakota Avenue South, the only one built to replace another house, which was moved to make way. Craftsman with Classical Revival detailing. Damaged, architecturally, in 1963 when its Classical Revival porch was replaced by a plain two-story front portico.
- Virgin House (1884,87), 222 First Street West
- 247 First Street West (c.1900)
- Williams House (1883), 339 First Street West
- Bell House (2nd) (1897), 350 First Street West
- Earle House (1905), 367 First Street West
- O. Williams House (1886), 413 First Street West
- K. Bell House (1909), 425 First Street West
- Winter House (1905), 442 First Street West
- Johnston House (1887, 1890), 447 First Street West, originally of Shingle style, designed by LeRoy Buffington, then revised to be more or less Colonial Revival around 1900, and later altered
- Boardman House (1904), 450 First Street West
- Johnston House (2nd) (1895), 467 First Street West
- Beal House (1888, 1905), 507 First Street West
- Doar House (1929–30), 510 First Street West, Colonial Revival, designed by Roy Childs Jones, head of the school of architecture at University of Minnesota
- 105 Montana Avenue South (c.1900)
- Bartlett House, 251 Second Street West (1873, 1887, 1903), was Italianate, altered later to almost Foursquare
- Simonton House 313 Second Street West (c.1870)
