= William Dwelley House =

Historic house in Wisconsin, United States

- U.S. National Register of Historic Places
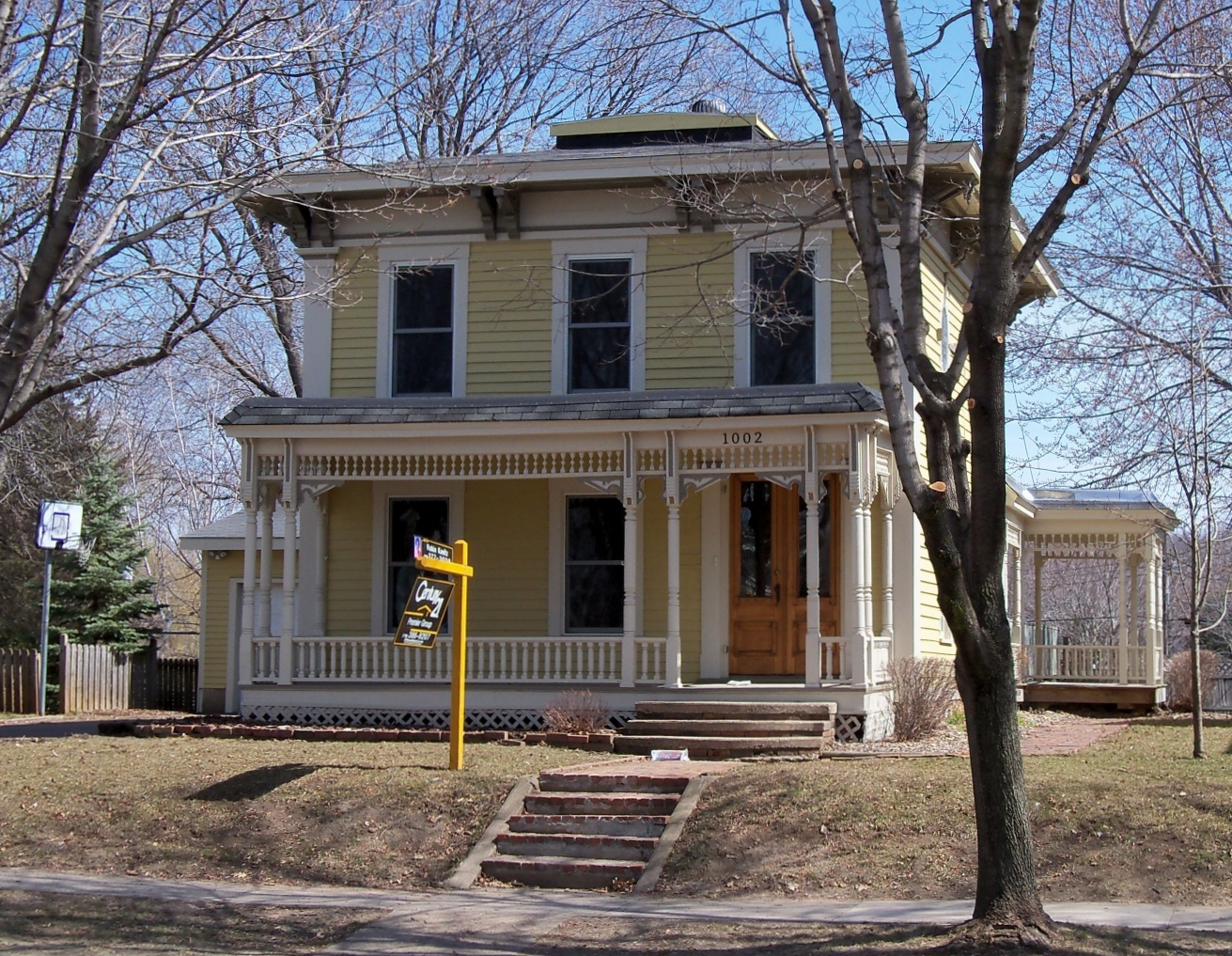

- Location within Wisconsin Location within the United States
- Location: 1002 4th Street; Hudson, Wisconsin
- Coordinates: 44°58′49″N 92°45′13″W
- Area: less than one acre
- Built: c. 1865
- Architectural style: Italianate
- MPS: Hudson and North Hudson MRA
- NRHP reference No.: 84000061
- Added to NRHP: October 4, 1984

The William Dwelley House (also known as the Harry Kaminsky House) is a historic house located in Hudson, Wisconsin. It is locally significant due to its association with William Dwelley and also its incorporation of the Italianate style of architecture.

It is a two-story house on a stone foundation.

It was added to the National Register of Historic Places in 1984.
