= North Hudson, Wisconsin =

- Village
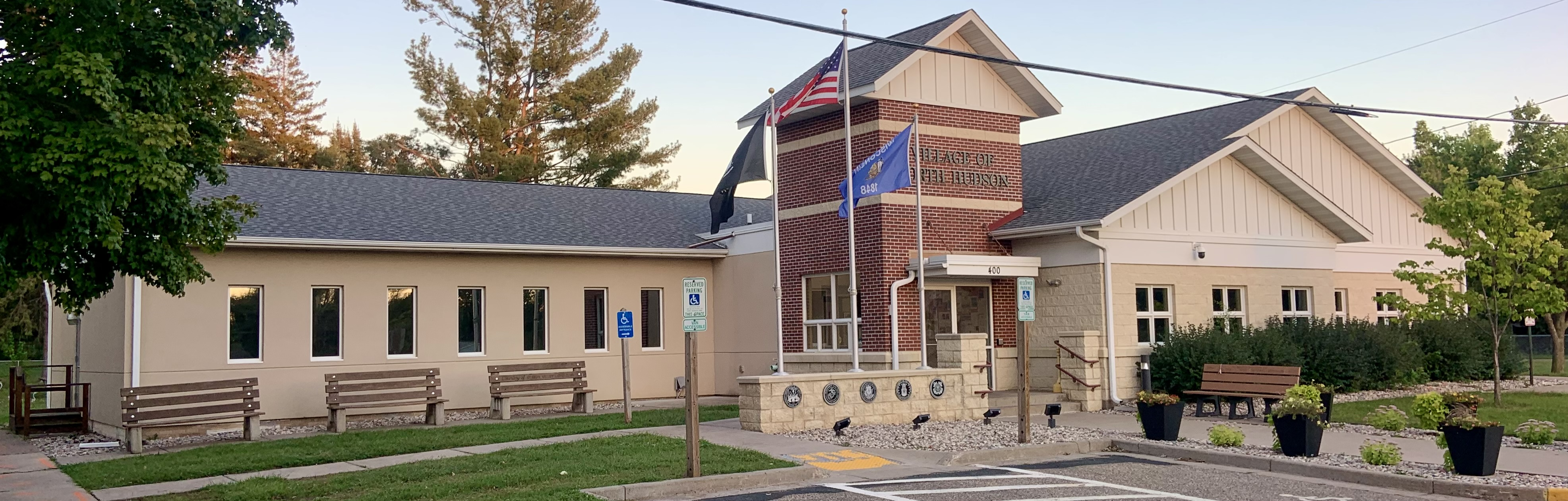
- Village hall

- Location of North Hudson in St. Croix County, Wisconsin.
- Coordinates: 44°59′43″N 92°45′18″W
- Country: United States
- State: Wisconsin
- County: St. Croix

Government
  - Type: President - Trustees
  - Village President: Stan Wekkin

Area
  - Total: 2.43 sq mi (6.30 km^{2})
  - Land: 1.57 sq mi (4.06 km^{2})
  - Water: 0.87 sq mi (2.25 km^{2})
- Elevation: 741 ft (226 m)

Population (2020)
  - Total: 3,803
  - Density: 2,430/sq mi (937/km^{2})
- Time zone: UTC-6 (Central (CST))
  - Summer (DST): UTC-5 (CDT)
- ZIP code: 54016
- Area codes: 715 & 534
- FIPS code: 55-58050
- GNIS feature ID: 1581684
- Website: https://www.northhudsonwi.gov/

North Hudson is a village in St. Croix County, Wisconsin, United States. The village is located in the Minneapolis–St. Paul metropolitan area. The population was 3,803 at the 2020 census.

== Geography ==
According to the United States Census Bureau, the village has a total area of 2.38 square miles (6.16 km^{2}), of which 1.57 square miles (4.07 km^{2}) is land and 0.81 square miles (2.10 km^{2}) is water.

Wisconsin Highway 35 serves as a main route in the community.

North Hudson is located at 44°59′43″N 92°45′18″W (44.995367, -92.754966). Less specifically, it is immediately north of the city of Hudson.

== Demographics ==
Historical population
Census	Pop.	Note	%±
1880	100		—
1920	586		—
1930	625		6.7%
1940	595		−4.8%
1950	787		32.3%
1960	1,019		29.5%
1970	1,547		51.8%
1980	2,218		43.4%
1990	3,101		39.8%
2000	3,463		11.7%
2010	3,768		8.8%
2020	3,803		0.9%
U.S. Decennial Census

As of 2000 the median income for a household in the village was $60,848, and the median income for a family was $70,938. Males had a median income of $46,970 versus $30,313 for females. The per capita income for the village was $26,540. About 1.3% of families and 1.8% of the population were below the poverty line, including 1.9% of those under age 18 and 5.7% of those age 65 or over.

=== 2010 census ===
As of the census of 2010, there were 3,768 people, 1,471 households, and 1,048 families residing in the village. The population density was 2,400.0 inhabitants per square mile (926.6/km^{2}). There were 1,552 housing units at an average density of 988.5 per square mile (381.7/km^{2}). The racial makeup of the village was 96.2% White, 0.9% African American, 0.6% Native American, 0.3% Asian, 0.1% Pacific Islander, 0.9% from other races, and 1.0% from two or more races. Hispanic or Latino of any race were 1.9% of the population.

There were 1,471 households, of which 35.7% had children under the age of 18 living with them, 57.0% were married couples living together, 8.8% had a female householder with no husband present, 5.5% had a male householder with no wife present, and 28.8% were non-families. 20.9% of all households were made up of individuals, and 4.9% had someone living alone who was 65 years of age or older. The average household size was 2.56 and the average family size was 2.98.

The median age in the village was 38.9 years. 26% of residents were under the age of 18; 6% were between the ages of 18 and 24; 28.1% were from 25 to 44; 29.6% were from 45 to 64; and 10.2% were 65 years of age or older. The gender makeup of the village was 49.3% male and 50.7% female.

== Government ==
North Hudson has its own police department, North Hudson Police Department. Fire service is provided through the City of Hudson by Hudson Fire Department. Lakeview Ambulance provides EMS.

In 2022, the village president, Stanley Wekkin, was among six elected officials in Wisconsin found to be former members of the far-right anti-government group Oath Keepers.

== Events ==
North Hudson hosts the North Hudson Pepper Festival during the third full weekend of August each year. It began as a way to raise money for North Hudson Elementary School. The festival continues to raise money for the school and also for several other community organizations. The festival has an Italian theme because when it began in 1954, there was a high population of Italians living in North Hudson. The festival includes events such as a parade, spaghetti or pepper eating contests, and a coronation where a king, a queen, and three princesses are chosen to serve as the North Hudson Pepper Festival Royalty for a year.
