= William J. Bernd House (Second Street, New Richmond, Wisconsin) =

Historic house in Wisconsin, United States

- U.S. National Register of Historic Places
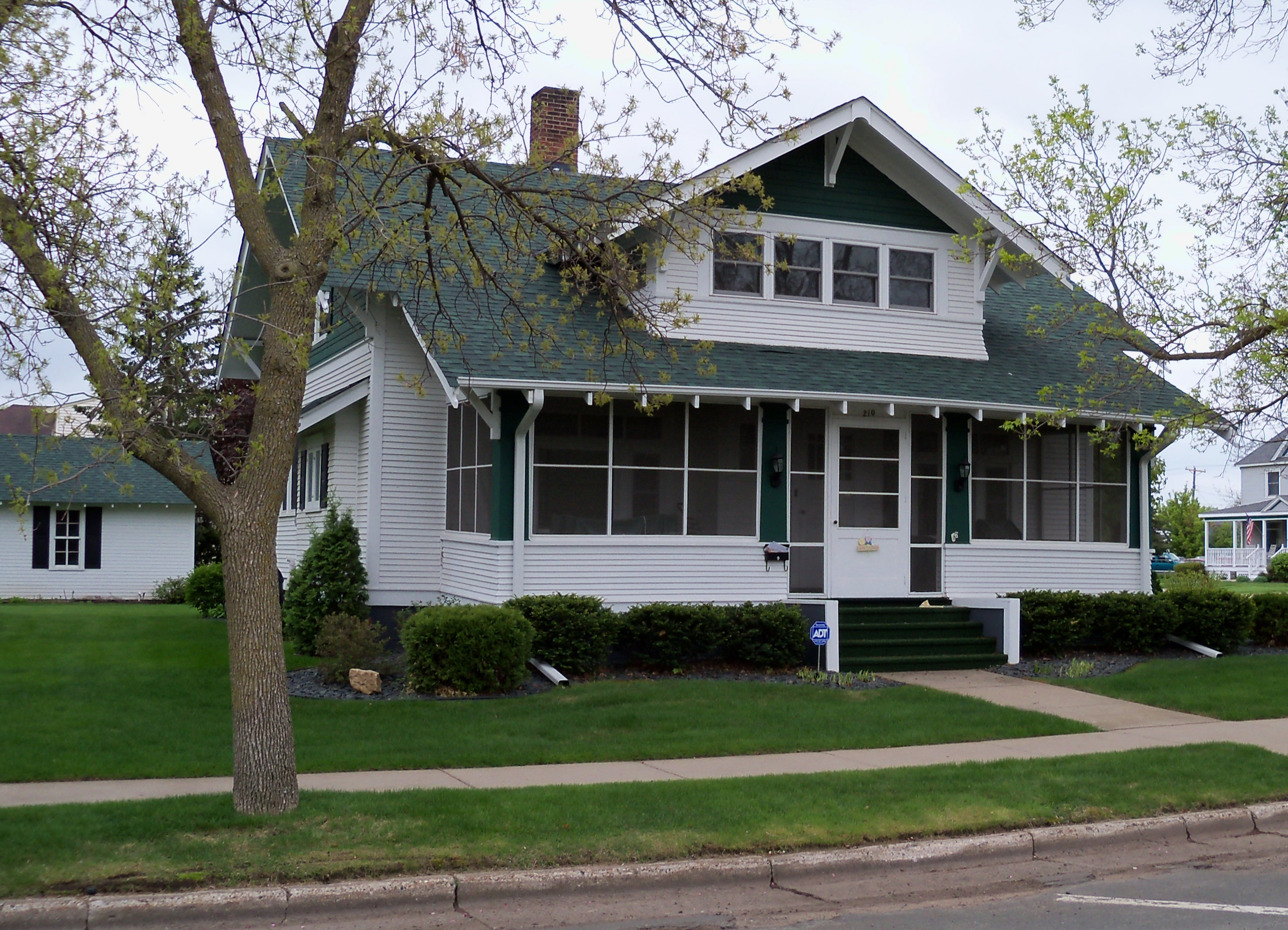
- William J. Bernd House

- Location within Wisconsin Location within the United States
- Location: 210 Second St., E. New Richmond, Wisconsin
- Coordinates: 45°07′17″N 92°32′07″W
- Area: less than one acre
- Built: c.1927
- Architectural style: Bungalow/craftsman
- MPS: New Richmond MRA
- NRHP reference No.: 88000615
- Added to NRHP: May 31, 1988

The William J. Bernd House is located in New Richmond, Wisconsin, United States. It is one of two houses sharing the name in New Richmond. The house was added to the National Register of Historic Places in 1988.

It was built around 1927. It was deemed significant as "Architecturally, this is the only pure example of a Craftsman style bungalow in New Richmond. With the exception of perhaps the screens on the front porch, the integrity is intact. The styling is virtually a textbook example of the Craftsman style bungalow, complete with 3" wide clapboard. Although bungalows are a minor housing type in the city, other examples have had various alterations. The integrity and detail on this bungalow make in significant as a local example of the style."
