= Big Sur =

Coastal region of California, United States

Big Sur, California
- Region
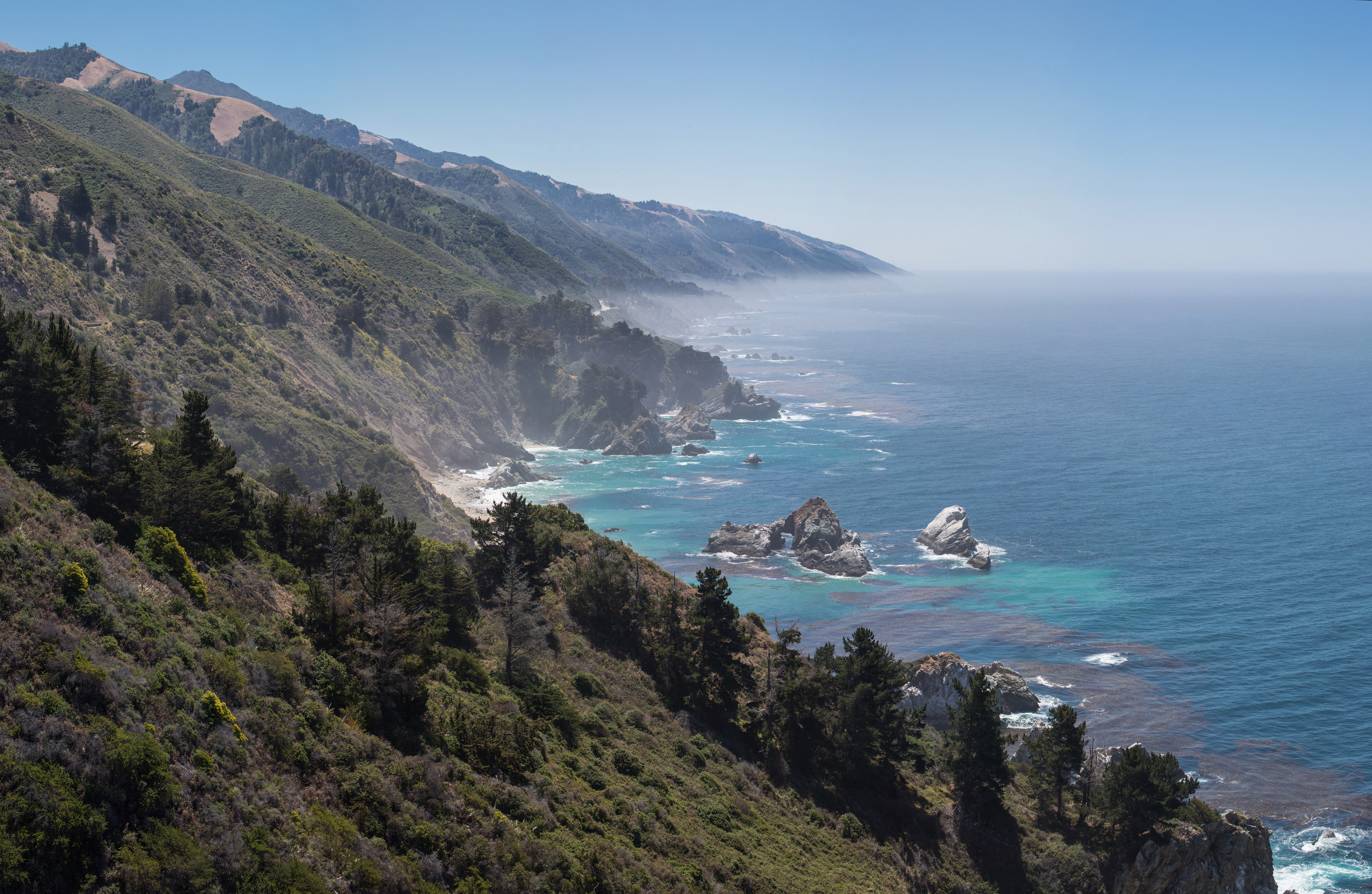
- Coastline

- Location in California
- Coordinates: 36.299216°N 121.873402°W
- Country: United States
- State: California
- Counties: Monterey, San Luis Obispo

Big Sur (/ˈsɜːr/) is a rugged and mountainous section of the Central Coast of the U.S. state of California, between Carmel Highlands and San Simeon, where the Santa Lucia Mountains rise abruptly from the Pacific Ocean. It is frequently praised for its dramatic scenery. Big Sur has been called the "longest and most scenic stretch of undeveloped coastline in the contiguous United States", a sublime "national treasure that demands extraordinary procedures to protect it from development", and "one of the most beautiful coastlines anywhere in the world, an isolated stretch of road, mythic in reputation". The views, redwood forests, hiking, beaches, and other recreational opportunities have made Big Sur a popular destination for visitors from across the world. With 4.5 to 7 million visitors annually, it is among the top tourist destinations in the United States, comparable to Yosemite National Park, but with considerably fewer services, and less parking, roads, and related infrastructure.

Big Sur Village is a collection of small roadside businesses and homes. The larger region known as Big Sur does not have specific boundaries but is generally considered to include the 71-mile (114 km) segment of California State Route 1 between Malpaso Creek near Carmel Highlands in the north and San Carpóforo Creek near San Simeon in the south, as well as the entire Santa Lucia range between these creeks. The interior region is mostly uninhabited, while the coast remains relatively isolated and sparsely populated, with between 1,800 and 2,000 year-round residents and relatively few visitor accommodations scattered among four small settlements. The region remained one of the most inaccessible areas of California and the entire United States until, after 18 years of construction, the Carmel–San Simeon Highway (now signed as part of State Route 1) was completed in 1937. Along with the ocean views, this winding, narrow road, often cut into the face of towering seaside cliffs, dominates the visitor's experience of Big Sur. The highway has been closed more than 55 times by landslides, and in May 2017, a 2,000,000-cubic-foot (57,000 m^{3}) slide blocked the highway at Mud Creek, north of Salmon Creek near the San Luis Obispo County line, to just south of Gorda. The road was reopened on July 18, 2018.

The region is protected by the Big Sur Local Coastal Plan, which preserves it as "open space, a small residential community, and agricultural ranching". Approved in 1986, the plan is one of the most restrictive local-use programs in the state, and is widely regarded as one of the most restrictive documents of its kind anywhere. The program protects viewsheds from the highway and many vantage points, and severely restricts the density of development. About 60% of the coastal region is owned by governmental or private agencies which do not allow any development. The majority of the interior region is part of Los Padres National Forest, Ventana Wilderness, Silver Peak Wilderness or Fort Hunter Liggett.

== Location ==
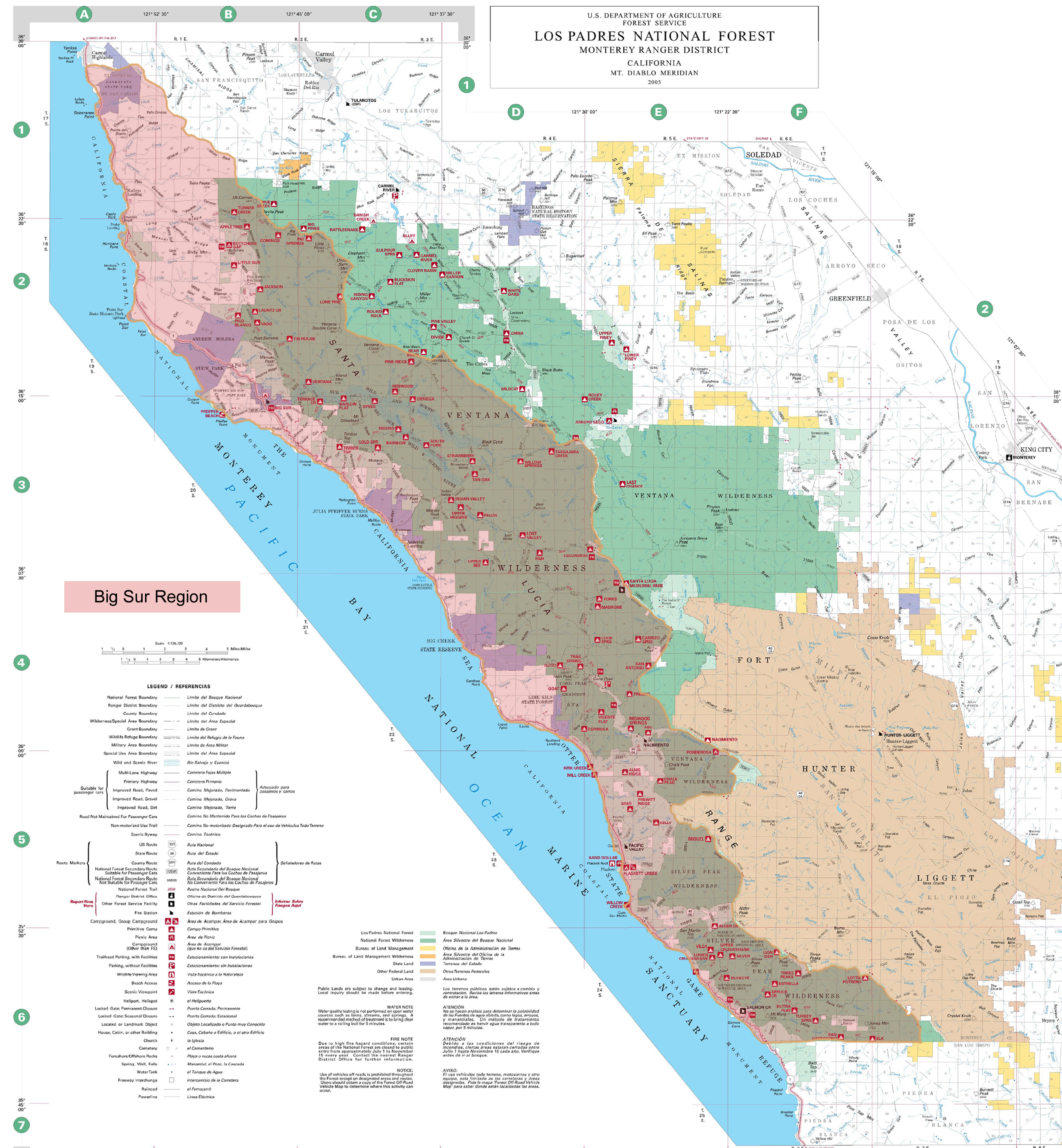
Approximate boundaries of the Big Sur region

Big Sur is not an incorporated town but a region without formal boundaries in California's Central Coast region. The region is often confused with the small community of buildings and services 26 miles (42 km) south of Carmel in the Big Sur River valley, sometimes referred to by locals as Big Sur Village, but officially known as Big Sur.

=== Historical boundaries ===
The various informal boundaries applied to the region have gradually expanded north and south over time. Esther Pfeiffer Ewoldson, who was born in 1904 and was a granddaughter of Big Sur pioneers Michael and Barbara Pfeiffer, wrote that the region extended from the Little Sur River 23 miles (37 km) south to Slates Hot Springs. Members of the Harlan Family, who homesteaded the Lucia region 9 miles (14 km) south of Slates Hot Springs, said that Big Sur was "miles and miles to the north of us". Prior to the construction of Highway 1, residents on the south coast had little contact with residents to the north of them.

=== Northern and southern boundaries ===
Most descriptions of the area refer to Malpaso Creek 4.5 miles (7.2 km) south of the Carmel River as the northern border. The southern border is generally accepted to be San Carpóforo Creek in San Luis Obispo County.

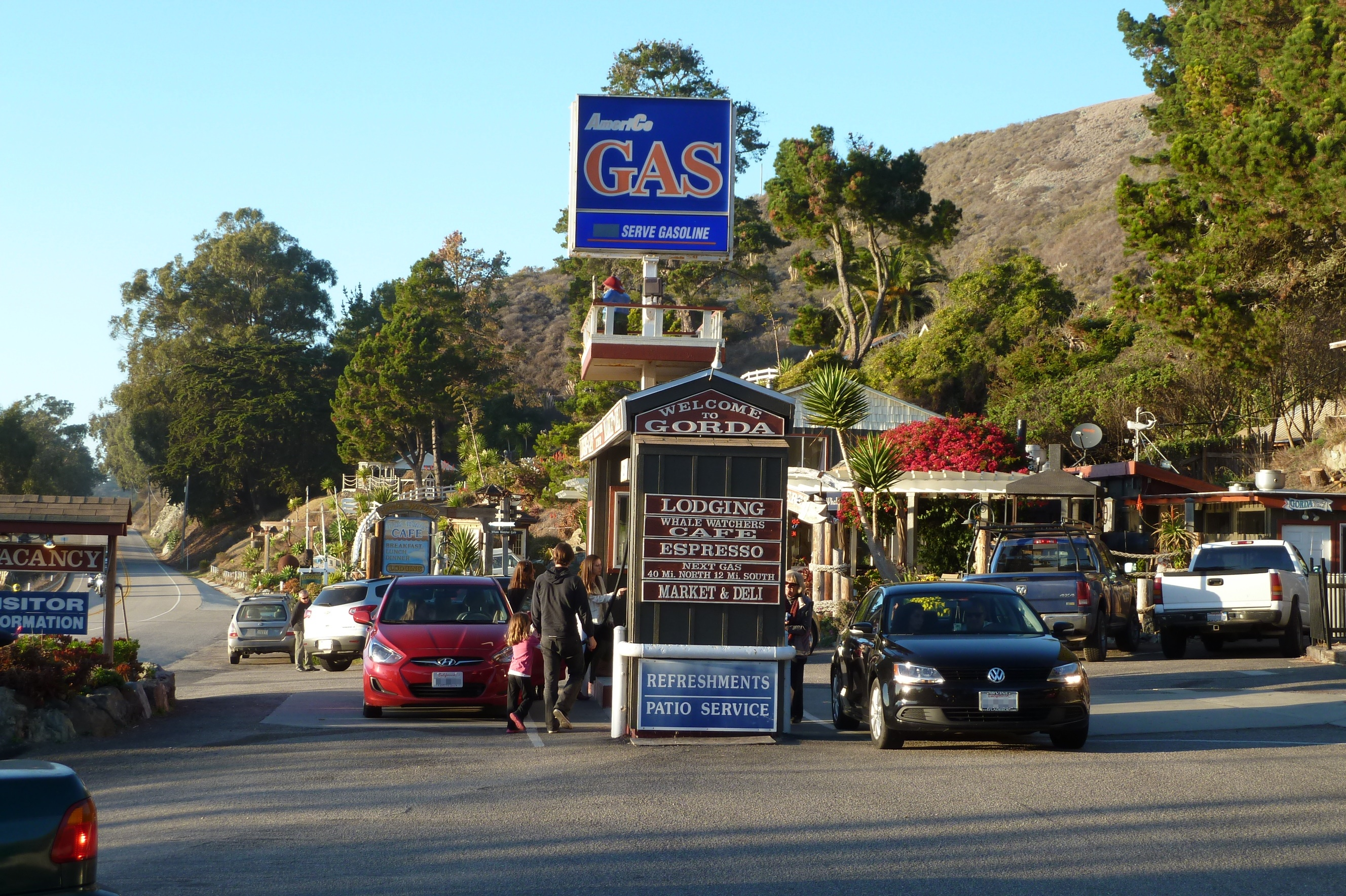
View of Gorda, one of the small clusters of services in Big Sur

=== Inland extent ===
The vast majority of visitors only see Big Sur's dramatic coastline and consider the Big Sur region to include only the coastal flanks of the Santa Lucia Mountains, which at various points extend from 3 to 12 miles (5 to 19 km) inland.

Some residents place the eastern border at the boundaries of the vast inland areas comprising the Los Padres National Forest, Ventana Wilderness, and Silver Peak Wilderness, or the unpopulated regions all the way to the eastern foothills of the Santa Lucia Mountains. Author and local historian Jeff Norman considered Big Sur to extend inland to include the watersheds that drain into the Pacific Ocean.

== Etymology ==
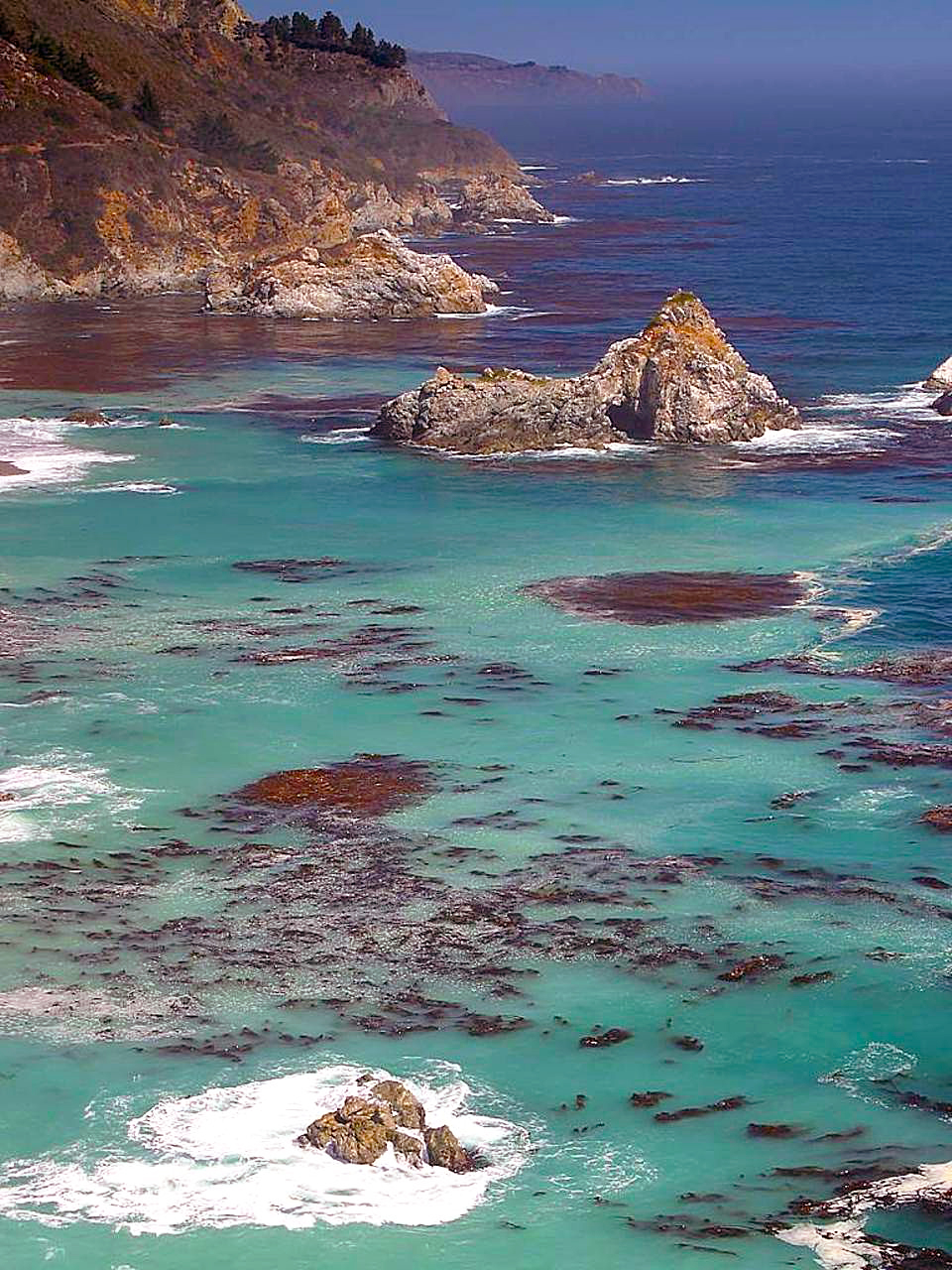
Big Sur: rocky coast, fog and giant kelp

The name "Big Sur" has its origins in the area's early Spanish history. While the Portolá expedition was exploring Alta California, they arrived at San Carpóforo Canyon near present-day San Simeon on September 13, 1769. Unable to penetrate the difficult terrain along the coast, they detoured inland through the San Antonio and Salinas Valleys before arriving at Monterey Bay, where they founded Monterey and named it the provincial capital.

The Spanish referred to the vast and relatively unexplored coastal region to the south of Monterey as el país grande del sur, meaning 'the big country of the south'. This was often shortened to el sur grande 'the big south'. The two major rivers draining this portion of the coast were named El Rio Grande del Sur and El Rio Chiquito del Sur.

The first recorded use of the name el Sud (meaning 'the South') was on a map of the Rancho El Sur land grant given by Governor José Figueroa to Juan Bautista Alvarado on July 30, 1834. The first American use of the name 'Sur' was by the United States Coast Survey in 1851, which renamed a point of land that looked like an island and was shaped like a trumpet, known to the Spanish as Morro de la Trompa and Punta Que Parece Isla, to Point Sur.

Big Sur's first post office was named "Posts" after William Brainard Post, in whose home it was located. He had obtained a patent to land at the top of the grade south of the Big Sur River, where he built a home in 1867. The English-speaking homesteaders petitioned the United States Post Office in Washington D.C. to change the name of their post office from Arbolado to Big Sur, and the rubber stamp using that name was returned on March 6, 1915, cementing the use of Big Sur as the place name.

== Popularity ==
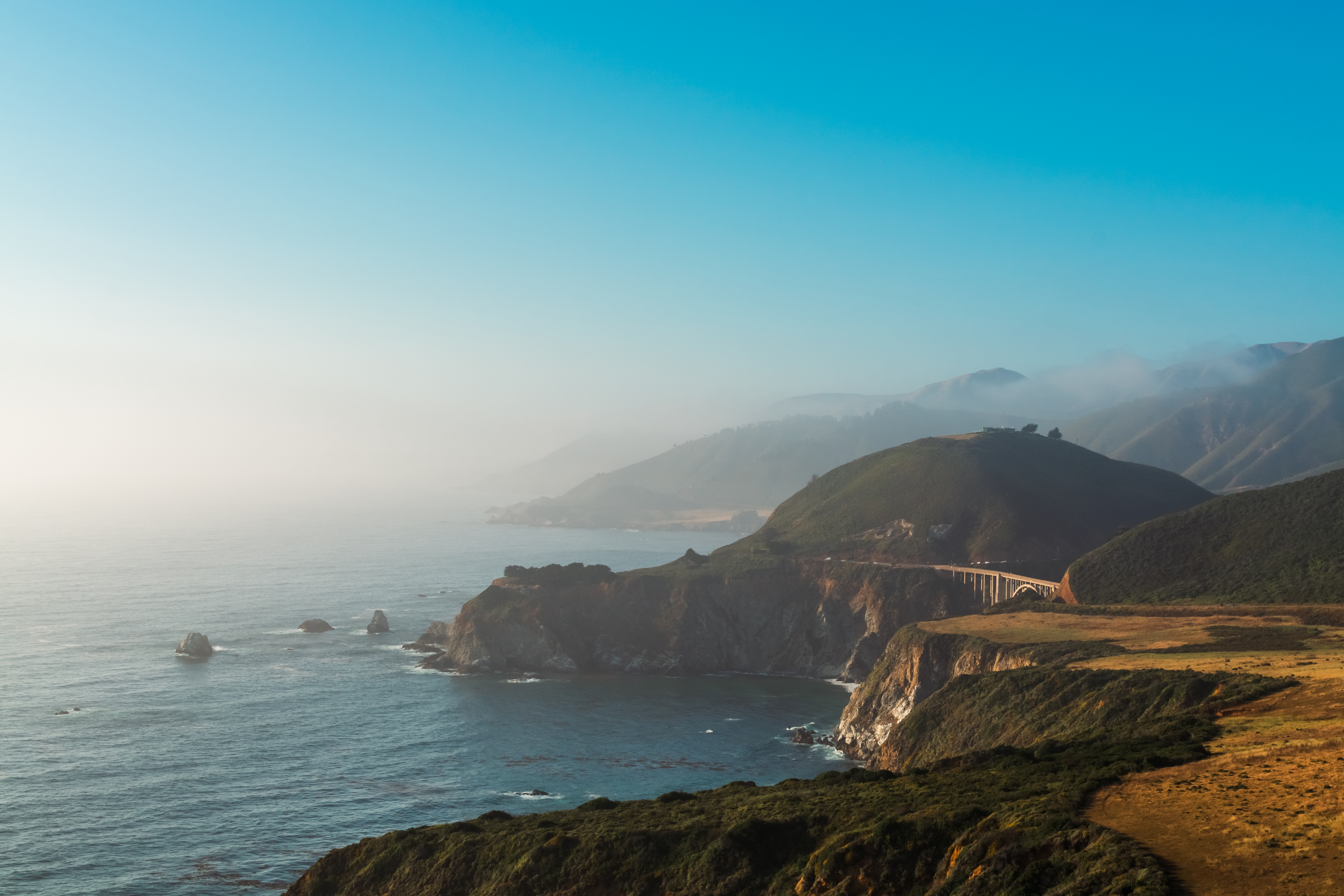
The Big Sur coast, looking north toward Bixby Creek Bridge

=== Scenic designations ===
The section of Highway 1 running through Big Sur is widely considered one of the most scenic driving routes in the United States, if not the world. The views are one reason that Big Sur was ranked second among all United States destinations in TripAdvisor's 2008 Travelers' Choice Destination Awards. The unblemished natural scenery owes much of its preservation to the highly restrictive development plans enforced in Big Sur; no billboards or advertisements are permitted along the highway and signs for businesses must be modestly scaled and of a rural nature conforming to the Big Sur region. The state of California designated the 72-mile (116 km) section of the highway from Cambria to Carmel Highlands as the first California Scenic Highway in 1965. In 1966, First Lady Lady Bird Johnson led the official scenic road designation ceremony at Bixby Creek Bridge. In 1996, the road became one of the first designated by the federal government as an "All-American Road" under the National Scenic Byways Program. CNN Traveler named McWay Falls as the most beautiful place in California.

=== Driving popularity ===
The drive along Highway 1 has been described as "one of the best drives on Earth", and is considered one of the top 10 motorcycle rides in the United States. Highway 1 was named the most popular drive in California in 2014 by the American Automobile Association. The region receives as many as and sometimes more visitors than Yosemite National Park. Unlike the national park managed by a single entity, the Big Sur region is ruled over by multiple government and private land owners, offers only occasional bus service, limited parking, few restrooms, and a single, narrow two-lane highway that for most of its length clings to the steep coastal cliffs. North-bound traffic during the peak summer season and holiday weekends is often backed up for about 20 miles (32 km) from Big Sur Village to Carmel Highlands. Due to the large number of visitors during the summer, congestion and slow traffic between Carmel and Posts is becoming the norm. However, during the winter, the road is frequently closed due to washouts and slides.

=== Protection ===
Despite its popularity, the region is heavily protected to preserve the rural and natural character of the land. The entire Big Sur coast is located within the protected coastal zone established by the 1976 California Coastal Act. This includes land use within a defined "coastal zone" extending inland from 3,000 ft (910 m) up to 5 mi (8.0 km). The California Coastal Commission has the authority to control the construction of any type, including buildings, housing, roads, as well as fire and erosion abatement structures, and can issue fines for unapproved construction. The Coastal Zone is specifically defined by law as an area that extends from the State's seaward boundary of jurisdiction, and inland for a distance from the Mean High Tide Line of between a couple of hundred feet in urban areas, to up to five miles in rural areas. The Big Sur Local Coastal Plan, approved by the Monterey County Supervisors in 1981, states that the region is meant to be an experience that visitors transit through, not a destination. For that reason, development of all kinds is severely restricted.

== Attractions ==
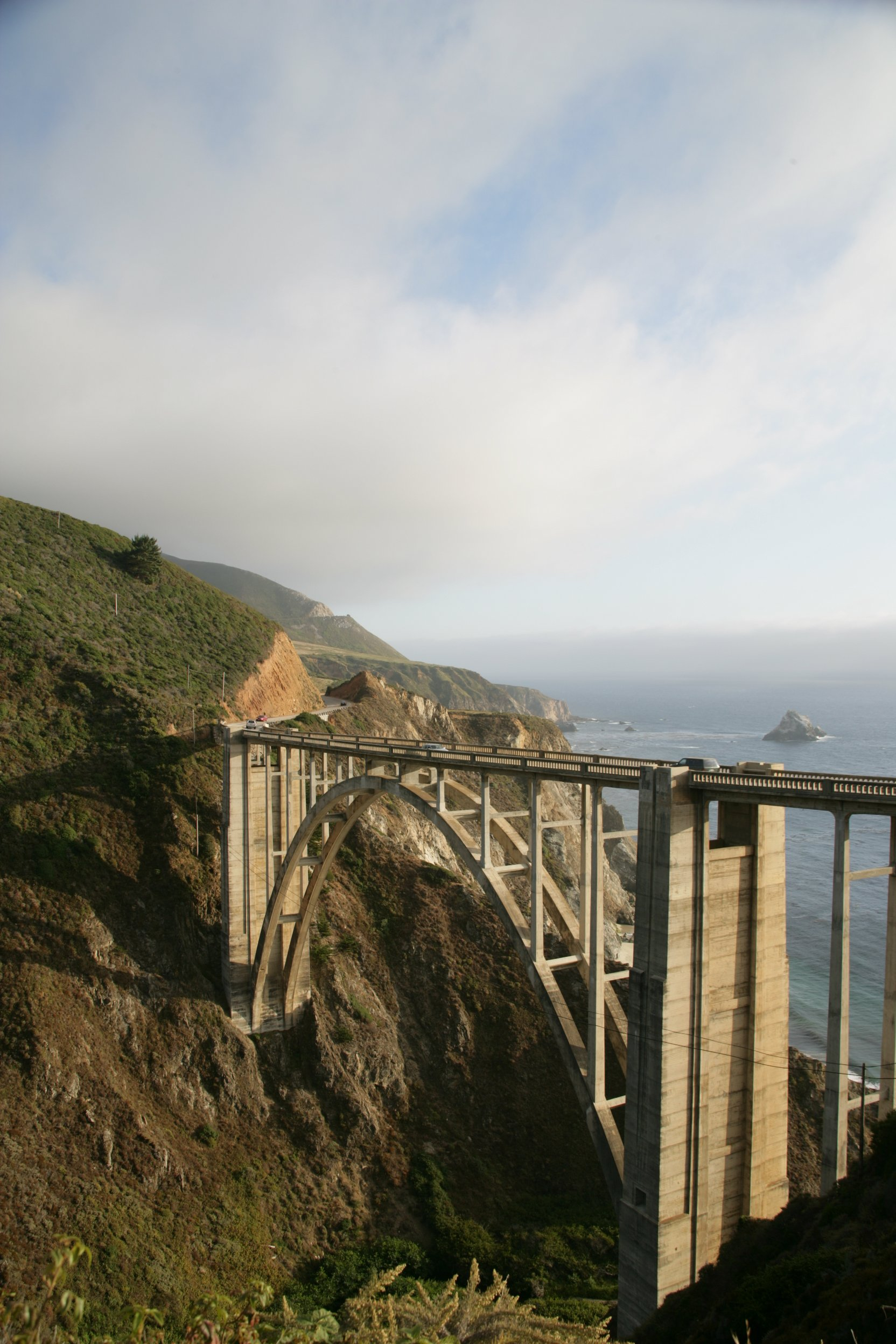
Bixby Creek Bridge, shown here looking southwest, is a popular attraction in Big Sur.

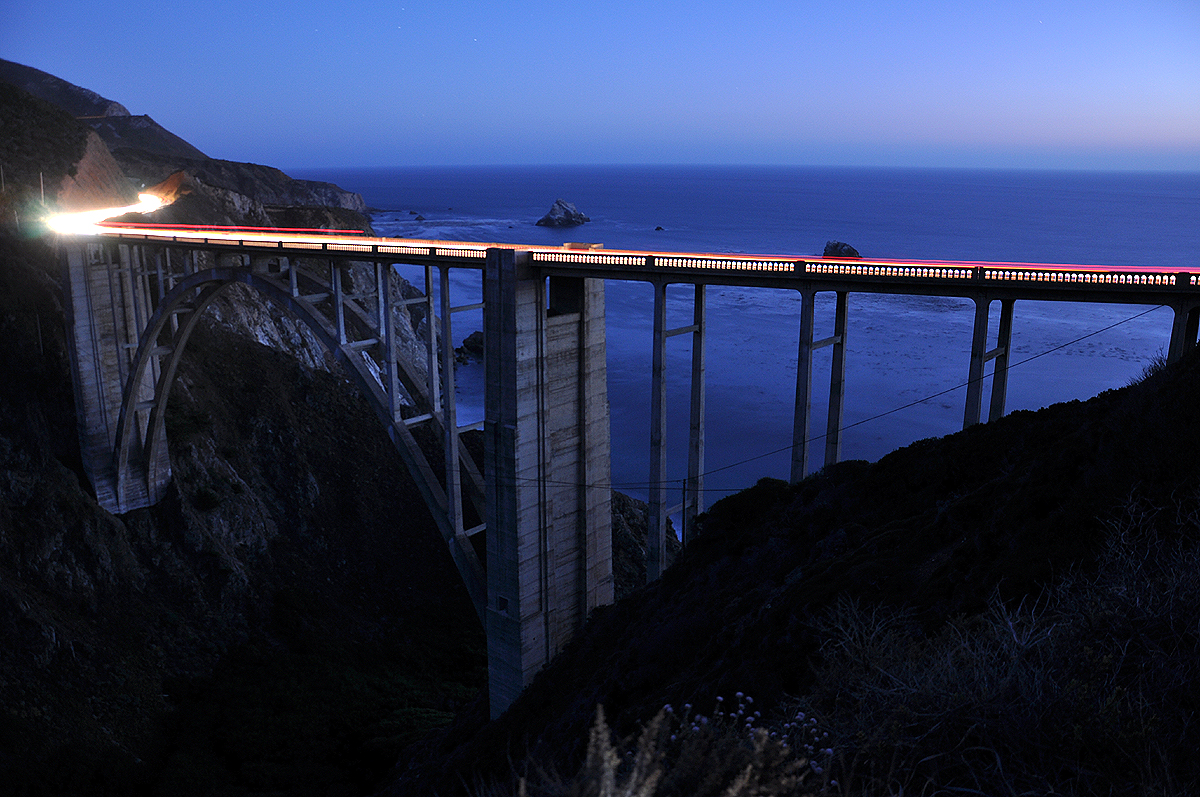
Bixby Creek Bridge at night

Besides sightseeing from the highway, Big Sur offers hiking and outdoor activities. There are a large number of state and federal lands and parks, including McWay Falls at Julia Pfeiffer Burns State Park, one of only two waterfalls in California that plunge directly into the ocean. The waterfall is located near the foundation of a grand stone cliffside house built in 1940 by Lathrop and Hélène Hooper Brown which was the region's first electrified home. However, parking is very limited and usually unavailable on summer weekends and holidays.

Another notable landmark is Point Sur Lightstation, the only complete nineteenth century lighthouse complex open to the public in California.

The Ventana Wildlife Center near Andrew Molera State Park features a free Discovery Center that enables visitors to learn about the California Condor recovery program and other wildlife.

The Henry Miller Memorial Library is a nonprofit bookstore and arts center that opened in 1981 as a tribute to the writer. Miller lived in Big Sur from 1944 to February 1963 and wrote about Big Sur in his book Big Sur and the Oranges of Hieronymus Bosch. It is a gathering place for locals and has become the focal point of individuals with a literary mind, a cultural center devoted to Miller's life and work, and a popular attraction for tourists.

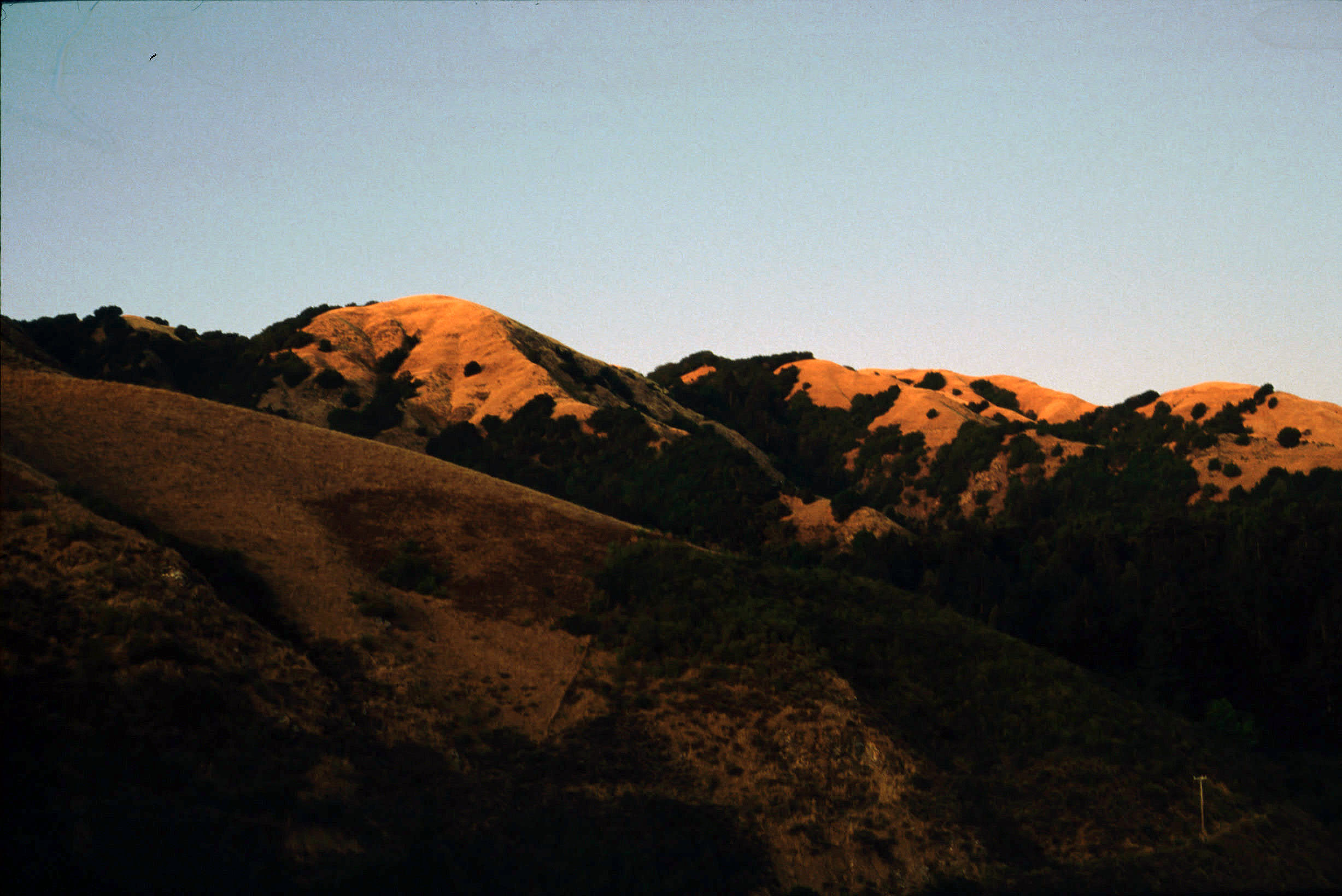
Santa Lucia Range from Nepenthe restaurant

=== Beaches ===
There are a few small, scenic beaches that are accessible to the public and popular for walking, but usually unsuitable for swimming, because of unpredictable currents, frigid temperatures, and dangerous surf. The beach at Garrapata State Park is sometimes rated as the best beach in Big Sur. Depending on the season, visitors can view sea otters, sea lions, seals, and migrating whales from the beach. The beach is barely visible from Highway 1.

Pfeiffer Beach is very popular but is only accessible via the narrow 2 miles (3.2 km) Sycamore Canyon Road. The parking lot at the beach only accommodates 60 vehicles and is usually full on summer and holiday weekends. During the summer, a shuttle operates from the US Forest Service headquarters to the beach. The wide sandy expanse offers views of a scenic arch rock offshore. It is sometimes confused with the beach at Julia Pfeiffer Burns State Park to the south.

In the south, Sand Dollar Beach is the longest stretch of beach in Big Sur. It is popular with hikers and photographers for its views of nearby bluffs. The beach is 25 miles (40 km) south of the Big Sur village on Highway 1. A steep staircase leads down to the beach from the highway. Jade Cove, 2 miles (3.2 km) south of Sand Dollar Beach, is also sometimes popular with visitors.

Swiss Canyon Beach is a long, sandy beach visible when looking north from the mouth of the Big Sur River in Andrew Molera State Park. The eastern side of the beach is bounded by private land. The beach may be accessible from the southern end depending on the tide.

Some beaches are surrounded by private land. At the mouth of the Little Sur river are some of the largest dunes on the Big Sur coast. The mouth of the Little Sur River, the dunes, and the mile-long Little Sur River beach are within the boundaries of the El Sur Ranch and are inaccessible to the public. The owner of the ranch maintains a secure fence and has prominently posted Private Property and No Trespassing signs on the fence along Highway 1 as suggested by legal precedent. While the beach below the mean high tide line is open to the public, the law does not permit individuals to trespass on private property to reach the public beach. Individuals who trespass to reach the beach have been cited.

Other beaches that are inaccessible to the public include Point Sur Beach, a long sandy beach located below and to the north of Point Sur Lighthouse. There is a small beach at Rocky Point that is surrounded by private property, making it inaccessible. The beach at the foot of McWay falls is physically inaccessible from the shore. To the south near the county line, Wreck Beach south of Pfeiffer Beach is not accessible. Gamboa Point Beach near the Monterey / San Luis Obispo county line is closed to the public.

=== Hiking ===
The Pine Ridge Trail (USFS 3E06) is the most popular hiking route into the Ventana Wilderness. Hikers can use it to access many campsites in the backcountry, including Ventana Camp, Terrace Creek, Barlow Flats, Sykes, and Redwood camps. When open, it is accessible from the Big Sur Station. The trail, connecting trails, and the campsites along its route were closed during the Soberanes Fire in July 2016. They were damaged by the fire itself and further damaged by the heavy rains during the following winter. As of August 2017, the trail was blocked by four major washouts and more than 100 fallen trees across the path. Reopening the trail will require an environmental assessment, and perhaps re-routing the trail entirely.

The Mt. Manuel Trail (USFS 2E06) begins within Pfeiffer Big Sur State Park. It follows a northeasterly route up the slopes of Mt. Manuel. Hikers following this route can access Vado and Launtz Creek campsites. It connects to the Little Sur trail that provides access to the Little Sur River watershed. The trail is not maintained.

The North Coast Ridge Road (USFS 20S05) is accessible from the road to the Ventana Inn and indirectly from the south via Limekiln State Park. Parking is available in the north at Cadillac Flat near the Ventana Inn. From Ventana Inn, the trail climbs steeply to the crest of the coastal ridge and south about 30 miles (48 km) to near Cone Peak. There are wide views in all directions for almost the entire hike. It connects to several trails over its length, including Terrace Creek Trail (closed as of January 2018), Boronda Trail, DeAngulo Trail, Big Sur Trail, Marble Peak Trail, Bee Camp Trail, Lost Valley Connector Trail, Rodeo Flat Trail, and the Arroyo Seco Trail. It provides access to Timber Top and Cold Spring Camp. It passes near the summit of Anderson Peak (4,099 feet (1,249 m)) and Marble Peak (4,031 feet (1,229 m)), and through to the Nacimiento-Fergusson Road and through connects to the Cone Peak Road. It is not open to vehicular traffic or bicycles. As of January 2018, the trail is closed.

Garrapata State Park, Andrew Molera State Park, Pfeiffer Big Sur State Park, and Julia Pfeiffer Burns State Park all contain short hiking trails. As of January 2018, almost all trails on the east side of Highway 1 in these parks are closed due to the Soberanes Fire and damage sustained during heavy rains the following winter. Some trails west of Highway 1 are open.

=== Places of contemplation ===
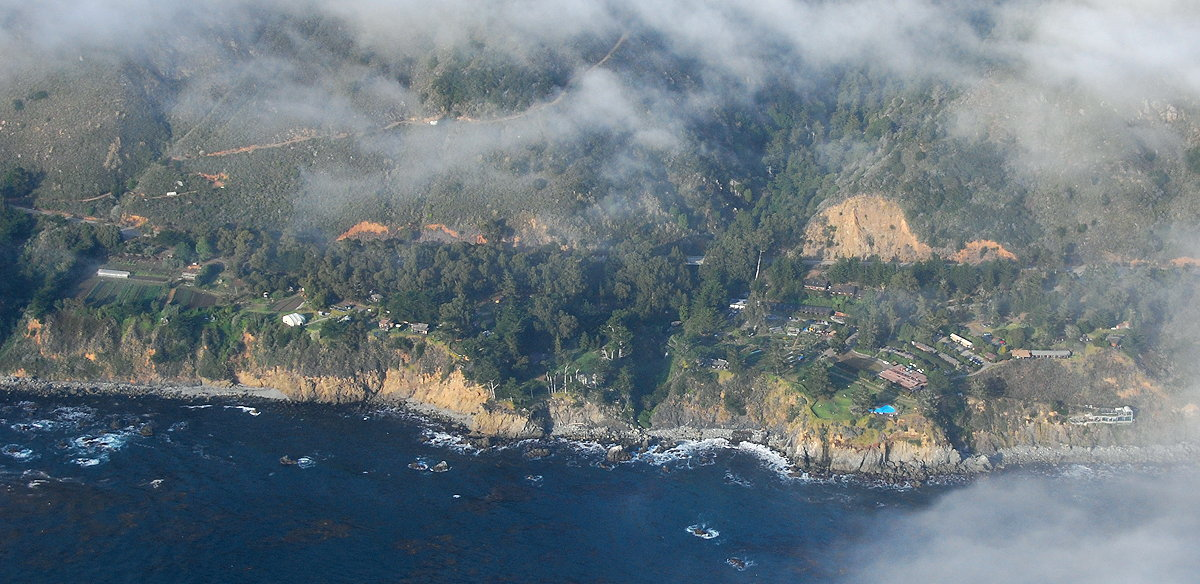
An evening aerial view of the Esalen Institute

Among the places that draw visitors is the once counterculture, later upscale Esalen Institute. Esalen hosted many figures of the nascent "New Age" and, in the 1960s, played an important role in popularizing Eastern philosophies, the "Human Potential Movement", and Gestalt therapy in the United States. Esalen is named after the Native Americans who congregated there at the natural hot springs possibly for thousands of years. Far from the coast within the Los Padres National Forest, the Tassajara Zen Mountain Center, accessible via a steep, narrow, 12-mile (19 km) dirt road, is only open to guests during the summer months.

Big Sur is also the location of a Catholic monastery, the New Camaldoli Hermitage. The Hermitage in Big Sur was founded in 1957. It rents a few simple rooms for visitors who would like to engage in silent meditation and contemplation. Normally all retreats are silent and undirected.

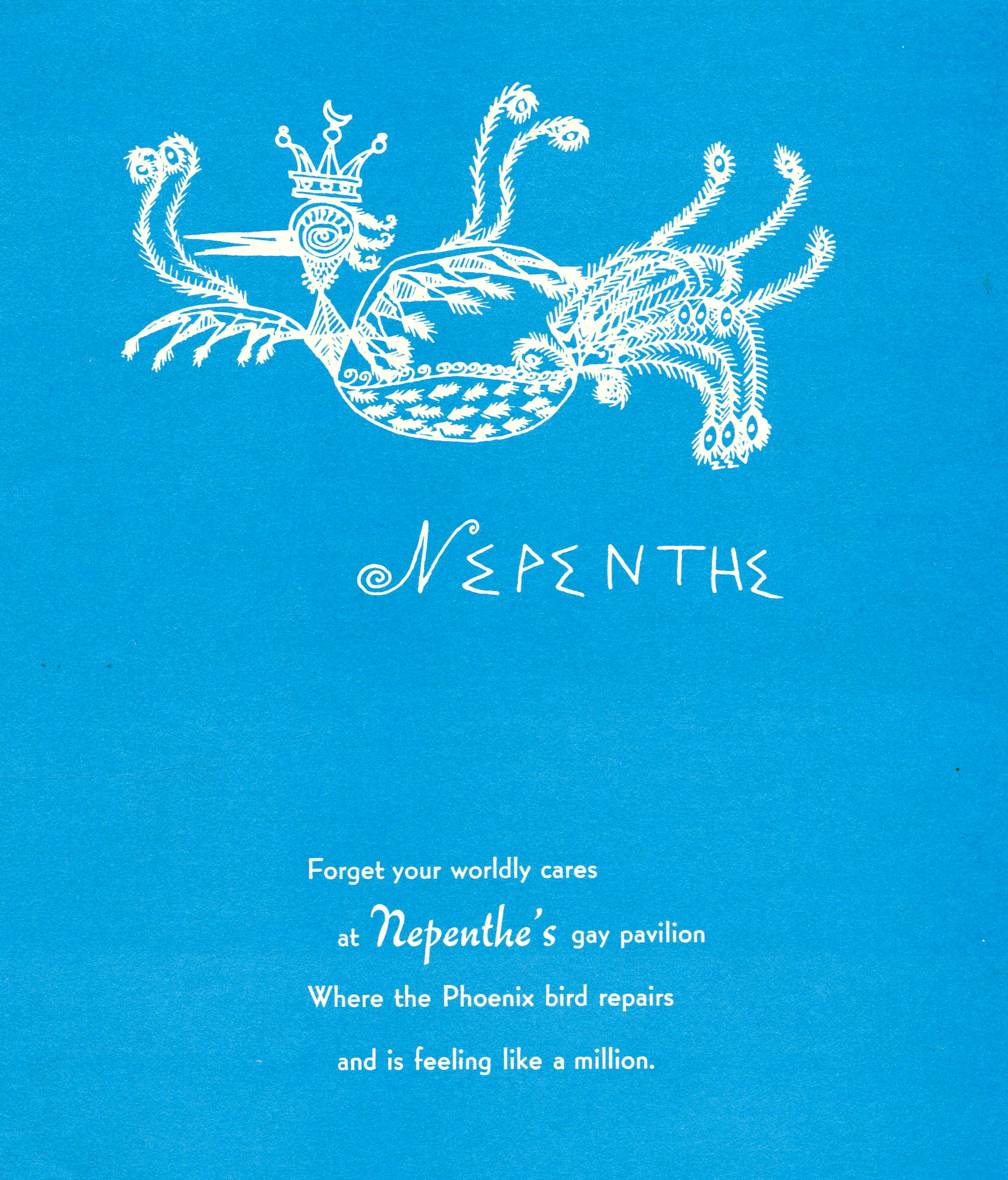
Historic menu cover from Nepenthe restaurant, a Big Sur icon since 1949

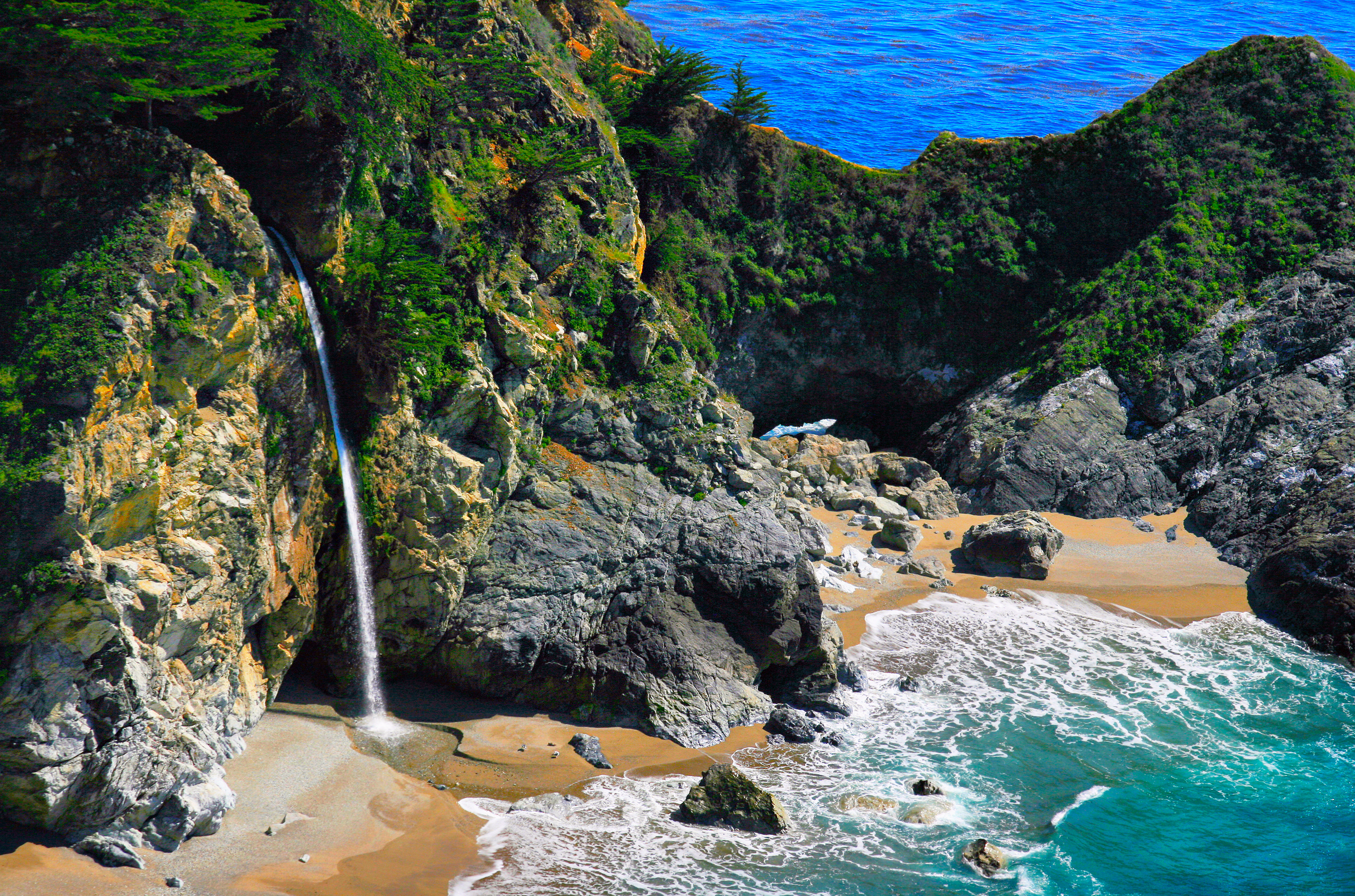
McWay Falls and McWay Cove

=== Special events ===
The Big Sur International Marathon is an annual marathon that begins south of Pfeiffer Big Sur State Park and ends at the Crossroads Shopping Center in Carmel-by-the-Sea. The marathon was established in 1986 and attracts about 4,500 participants annually.

Civic leaders in Big Sur stage a run each year in October to raise funds for the Big Sur Volunteer Fire Brigade and the Big Sur Health Center. Since the race, known as the Big Sur River Run, was founded in 1971, more than $1,025,104 has been donated to the two organizations. The run through the redwoods was canceled in 2016 due to the Soberanes Fire and in 2017 due to winter storms.

The Big Sur Folk Festival was held from 1964 to 1971. It began unintentionally when Nancy Carlen, a friend of singer Joan Baez, organized a weekend seminar at the Esalen Institute in June 1964 titled "The New Folk Music". On Sunday afternoon, they invited all the neighbors for a free, open performance. This became the first festival. The festival was held yearly on the grounds of the Esalen Institute, except for 1970, when it was held at the Monterey County Fairgrounds. Even when well-known acts like Crosby, Stills, Nash & Young or the Beach Boys performed, the event was purposefully kept small with no more than a few thousand in attendance.

== State and federal lands ==
=== State parks ===
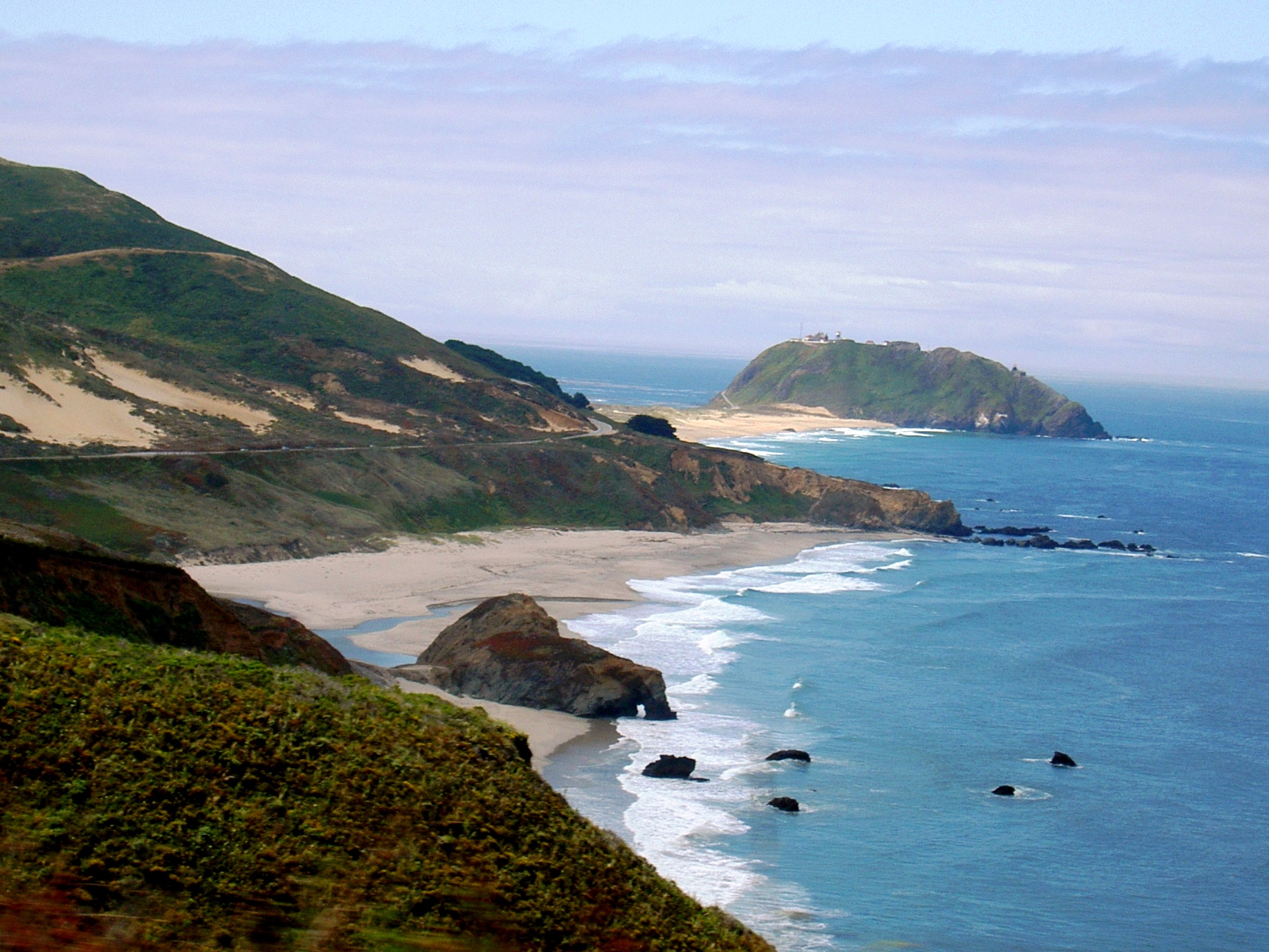
Point Sur and light station from the north

The state parks in Big Sur grew out of the original residents' desire to protect and preserve the land they admired. "The early settlers considered land stewardship their obligation to the community." The first was Pfeiffer Big Sur State Park. John Pfeiffer, son of pioneers Michael Pfeiffer and Barbara Laquet, was offered $210,000 for his land near Sycamore Canyon by a Los Angeles developer, who wanted to build a subdivision on the land. Instead, Pfeiffer sold 1.1 mi^{2} (2.8 km^{2}) to the state of California in 1933.

As of January 2018, portions of most of these parks are closed due to after effects of the Soberanes Fire. From north to south, the following state parks are in use:

- Garrapata State Park
- Point Sur State Historic Park
- Andrew Molera State Park
- Pfeiffer Big Sur State Park
- Julia Pfeiffer Burns State Park
- Limekiln State Park

=== State reserves ===
- John Little State Natural Reserve
- Big Creek State Marine Reserve and Marine Conservation Area

=== Federal land ===
As of January 2018, some trails and campsites within the following areas are closed, due to damage caused by the 2016 Soberanes Fire and the following winter's rains.

- Pfeiffer Beach
- Los Padres National Forest
- Ventana Wilderness
- Silver Peak Wilderness

== Overuse issues ==
During most summer weekends and on all major holidays, Big Sur is overwhelmingly crowded. Although some Big Sur residents catered to adventurous travelers in the early twentieth century, the modern tourist economy began when Highway 1 opened the region to automobiles in 1937, but only took off after World War II-era gasoline rationing and a ban on pleasure driving ended in August 1945. Big Sur has become a destination for travelers both within the United States and internationally.

=== Increasing numbers of visitors ===
The number of visitors to Big Sur has risen from about 1.5 million in 1978, to about 3 million in 1980, to an estimated 4 to 5 million during 2014 and 2015, comparable to or greater than the number of visitors to Yosemite National Park. Unlike Yosemite, which is managed by a single federal entity, about one-quarter of the land in Big Sur is privately owned and the remainder is managed by a conglomeration of federal, state, local, and private agencies. Yosemite offers 5,400 parking spots and a free, daily, park-wide bus service. In Big Sur during the summer, there is a single public bus that runs three times daily and a single shuttle van that operates on Thursday through Sunday from the Big Sur Station to Pfeiffer Beach. The owner of the Nepenthe restaurant estimated in 2017 that the number of visitors had increased by 40% since 2011. Big Sur residents and business owners are concerned about the impact visitors are having on the region. Traffic and parking is consistently bad during summer and holidays weekends and some visitors don't obey the laws.

Residents began discussing the potential necessity of shuttle buses, tollgates along Highway 1, and limits on the number of private autos allowed on the highway in 1978. One of the reasons for Big Sur's popularity is that it is only a one-day drive for about 7 million people. With the advent of social media, hashtags like "#sykeshotsprings" and "#pineridgetrail", two popular destinations within Big Sur, encourage more visitors. Visitors must pay $15 for a parking spot at a trailhead parking lot and take a 14-passenger van to Pfeiffer Beach.

The television series Big Little Lies, which is filmed in the Monterey and Big Sur area, has increased the number of visitors to the area.

=== Restricted public transportation ===
Public transportation is available to and from Monterey on Monterey–Salinas Transit. The summer schedule operates from Memorial Day to Labor Day three times a day, while the winter schedule only offers bus service on weekends. The route is subject to interruption due to wind and severe inclement weather.

=== Limited vehicle services ===
There are only six gas stations along Highway 1 in Big Sur, from Ragged Point in the south to Carmel Highlands in the north. Three of them are in the north near Big Sur Valley. The gas station at the Big Sur River Inn and Restaurant offers a steep discount to local residents. The filling station in Gorda has one of the highest prices in the United States, as it is far from the electrical grid and part of the cost of auto fuel is used to support the operation of a diesel generator. All of them only operate during regular business hours and none of them supply diesel fuel. There are three Tesla recharging stations near Posts.

=== Lack of restrooms ===
It's a 'scenic highway' with piles of shit up and down the highway.

— Butch Kronlund, Coast Property Owners Association Executive Director

There are only 16 public restrooms along the entire coast to accommodate the almost 5 million annual visitors. The number of visitors far exceeds the available restrooms, and most restrooms are not available in locations where tourists frequently visit. Businesses report that the large number of visitors using their bathroom has overwhelmed their septic systems.

If visitors can locate them, they can use bathrooms within California State Parks or federal campgrounds without paying an entrance fee. But many of the bathrooms are not visible from Highway 1. This is due in part to the fact that restroom signs along Highway 1 were removed for aesthetic reasons.

As a result, visitors often resort to defecating in the bushes near locations like the Bixby Creek Bridge. Residents complain that visitors regularly defecate along Highway 1. Toilet paper, human waste, and trash litter the roadsides. Residents have taken it upon themselves to clean up after visitors. The California Department of Transportation, which cleans the roadside areas about once a week, finds human waste during every cleanup. Butch Kronlund, executive director of the Coast Property Owners Association, criticized the lack of restrooms. He says, "It's a 'scenic highway' with piles of shit up and down the highway."

The 1976 California Coastal Act makes installing public bathrooms, trash bins, or even new road signs along Highway 1 extremely difficult. Several federal, state, and local agencies have jurisdiction in Big Sur, all of which must weigh in on decisions affecting residents and visitors.

=== Few visitors' services ===
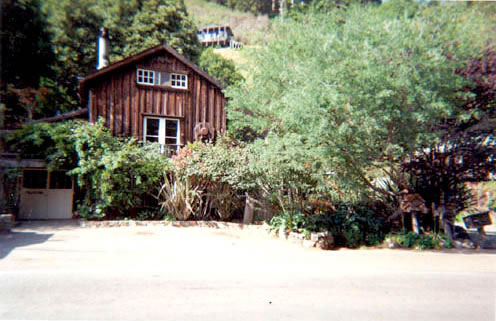
Deetjen's Big Sur Inn is listed on the National Register of Historic Places.

The land use restrictions that preserve Big Sur's natural beauty also mean that visitor accommodations are limited, often expensive, and places to stay fill up quickly during the busy summer season.

There are no urban areas, just three small clusters of restaurants, gas stations, motels, and camp grounds: Posts in the Big Sur River valley, Lucia, near Limekiln State Park, and Gorda, on the southern coast. Scattered among these distant settlements are nine small grocery stores, a few gift shops, and no chain hotels, supermarkets, or fast-food outlets, and no plans to add facilities or shopping. Among the places to stay and eat are the luxury Ventana Inn, Post Ranch, and the Nepenthe restaurant, built around the cabin Orson Welles and Rita Hayworth impulsively bought.

=== Limited accommodation ===
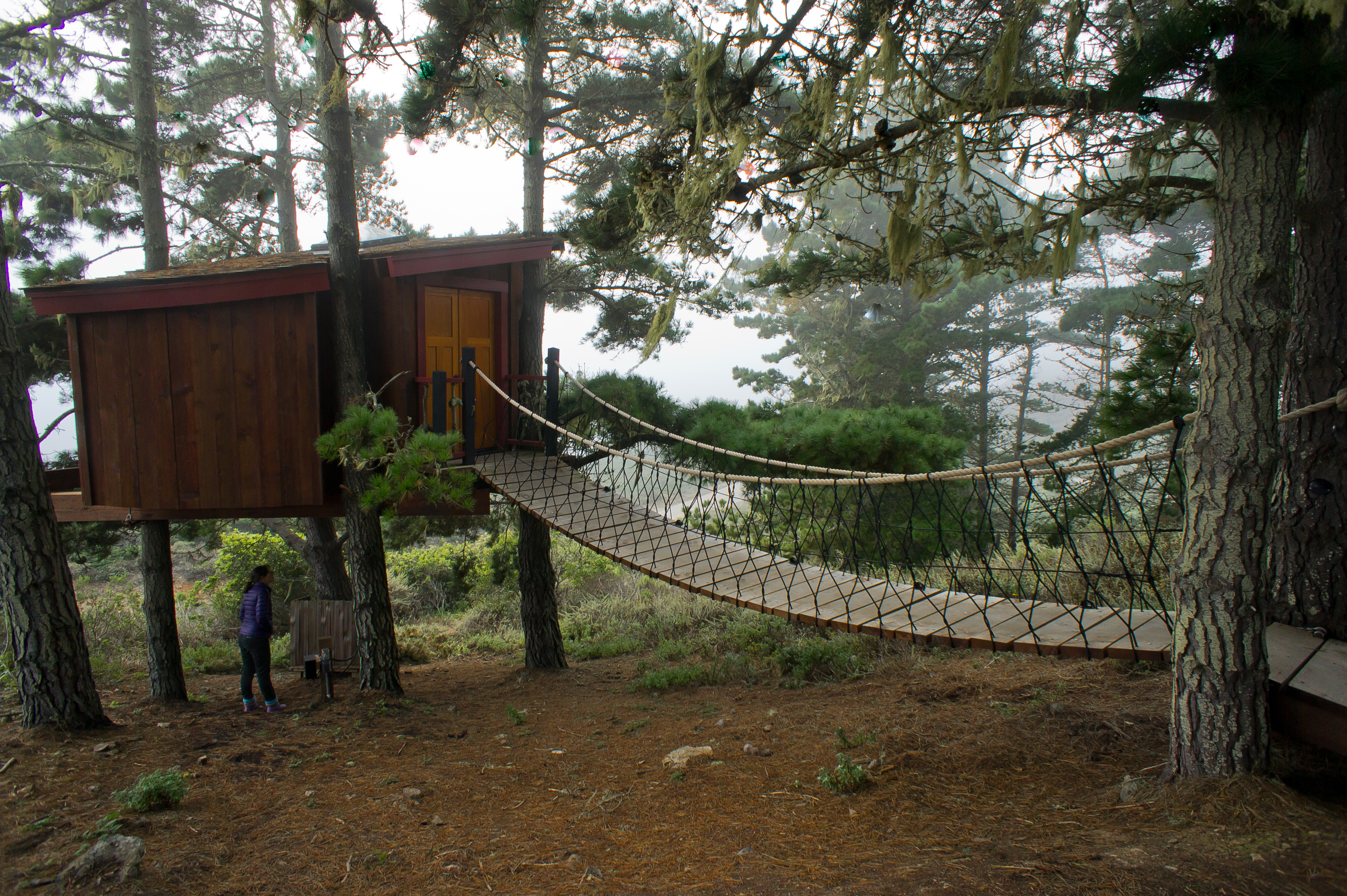
One of the accommodations at the Treebones campsite and resort in Big Sur

There are fewer than 300 hotel rooms on the entire 90-mile (140 km) stretch of Highway 1 between San Simeon and Carmel. Lodging include a few cabins, motels, and campgrounds, and higher-end resorts. There are some short-term rentals, but their legality is still being determined.

=== Illegal camping ===
Some social media sites report the availability of free camping on the side of roads, but camping of any sort or parking overnight along highways and local roads is illegal and violators are regularly cited. Sleeping in cars is illegal and subject to a $1000 fine. Casual campers have at times turned every wide spot along the Nacimiento-Fergusson Road into an illegal campsite, although there are no bathrooms or fire pits. Residents complain about illegal camp fires and people defecating along the road without using proper sanitation. Camping is only permitted within designated private and state or federal park campsites or within USFS lands.

On July 22, 2016, an illegal campfire within Garrapata State Park, where camping is not permitted, got out of control. The resulting Soberanes Fire burned 132,127 acres (53,470 ha), 57 homes and 11 outbuildings, and killed a bulldozer operator. It took almost three months to extinguish and cost about $236 million to suppress. In October, 2017, a visitor from Florida was arrested for starting an illegal campfire that grew out of control.

=== Solutions under consideration ===
The Community Association of Big Sur (formerly the Big Sur Property Owners Association) is proposing some solutions. They want to close the parking lot at Bixby Creek for a year to encourage visitors to take public transportation. They are considering asking community volunteers to keep tourists from walking onto the bridge, which is both dangerous and illegal. Tourists who want to get to Pfeiffer Beach over the mile-long, one-lane road to a small 65-car parking lot would be required to reserve and pay for parking ahead of time or take a shuttle. Parking on the highway shoulder at popular McWay Falls to avoid a $10 parking lot fee would be prohibited. Another idea under consideration is a ban on dispersed camping in the national forest during fire season "until proper backcountry monitoring and enforcement exists". An illegal campfire in 2017 burned 57 homes and killed one firefighter. The Forest Service used to have several backcountry rangers but removed them all.

== Culture ==
The arrival of Bay Area artists in Carmel-by-the-Sea beginning in 1904 was the beginning of a literary and artistic colony on the northern edge of Big Sur. Robinson Jeffers moved to Carmel in September 1914, and over his lifetime wrote many evocative poems about the isolation and natural beauty of Big Sur. Beginning in the 1920s, his poetry introduced the romantic idea of Big Sur's wild, untamed spaces to a national audience, which encouraged many of the later visitors.

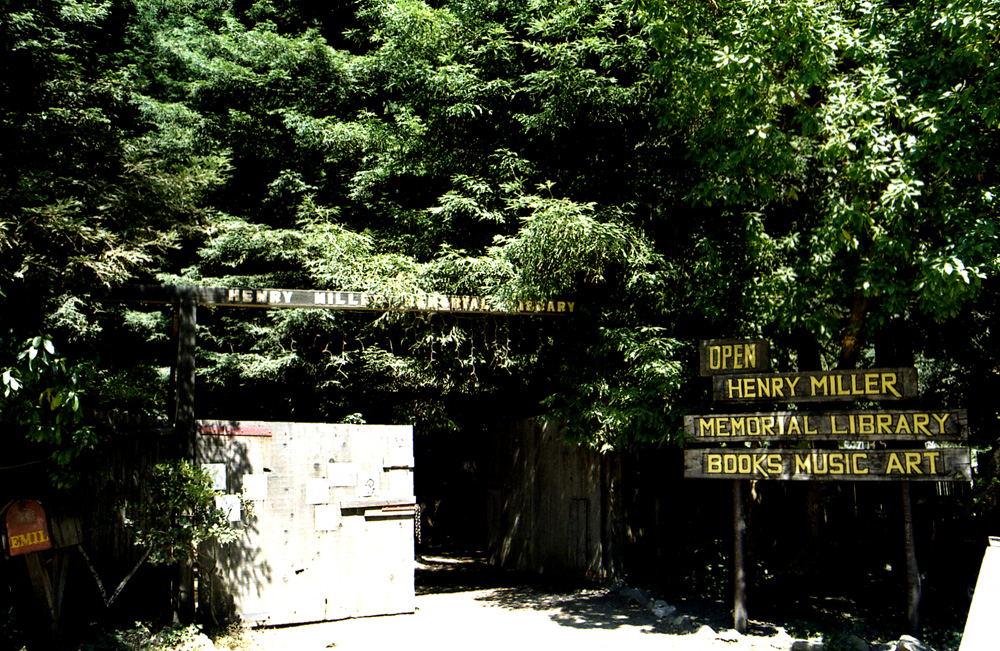
The Henry Miller Memorial Library. Author Henry Miller lived in Big Sur from 1944 to 1962.

Henry Miller moved to Big Sur at the invitation of the Greco-French artist Jean Varda, uncle of filmmaker Agnès Varda. He lived in Big Sur for almost 20 years, from 1944 to 1962. When he first arrived, he was broke and novelist Lynda Sargent was renting a cabin from a local riding club. She allowed Miller to live rent-free for a while. But when the cabin was sold to Orson Welles and Rita Hayworth in 1945, Miller moved several miles south to a wood cabin on Partington Ridge that had been owned by his friend Emil White.

While in Big Sur, Miller, avant-garde musician Harry Partch and Jean Varda were part of a local group of bohemians known as the Anderson Creek Gang, many of whom lived at the former highway work camp near the mouth of Anderson Creek. Miller lived in a shack there during 1946 before moving back to the cabin on Partington Ridge in 1947. In his 1957 essay/memoir/novel Big Sur and the Oranges of Hieronymus Bosch, Miller described the joys and hardships that came from escaping the "air-conditioned nightmare" of modern life.

=== Bohemian reputation ===
Hunter S. Thompson worked as a security guard and caretaker at a resort in Big Sur Hot Springs for eight months in 1961, just before the Esalen Institute was founded at that location. While there, he published his first feature story in the nationally distributed men's magazine Rogue about Big Sur's artisan and bohemian culture. In the article, he described how the Bohemian image attracted people who annoyed residents:

Every weekend Dick Hartford, owner of the local Village Store, is plagued by people looking for "sex orgies", "wild drinking brawls", or "the road to Henry Miller's house" as if once they found Miller everything else would be taken care of ...

Time was when this place was as lonely and isolated as any spot in America. But no longer; inevitably, Big Sur has been "discovered". Life called it a "Rugged, Romantic World Apart", and presented nine pages of pictures to prove it. After that, there was no hope ...

And on some weekends, it seems like all seven million of them are right here, bubbling over with questions: "Where's the art colony man? I've come all the way from Tennessee to join it." "Say, fella, where do I find this nudist colony?"... Or the one that drove Miller half-crazy: "Ah-ha! So you're Henry Miller! Well my name is Claude Fink and I've come to join the cult of sex and anarchy."

Other writers and artists were also attracted by Big Sur, including Edward Weston, Richard Brautigan, Emile Norman and Jack Kerouac. Big Sur acquired a bohemian reputation with these newcomers. Kerouac followed Miller to Big Sur and included the rugged coast in large parts of two of his novels. He spent a few days in early 1960 at fellow poet Lawrence Ferlinghetti's cabin in Bixby Canyon and based his novel Big Sur on his time there.

== Notable people ==
Well-known individuals have called Big Sur home, including:

- José Abrego merchant, politician
- Ansel Adams photographer / musician
- Juan Bautista Alvarado politician
- Morley Baer photographer
- José Castro politician, statesman, and military officer
- John B. R. Cooper merchant, landowner
- Kaffe Fassett textile artist
- Lawrence Ferlinghetti author
- Allen Funt actor
- Al Jardine musician
- Philip Johnson architect
- Carolyn Mary Kleefeld author and artist
- Blaise Godbe Lipman actor and director
- Henry Miller author and artist
- Mickey Muennig architect
- John Nesbitt radio announcer, TV producer
- Emile Norman artist
- Kim Novak actress
- Nathaniel A. Owings architect
- David Packard business executive
- Linus Pauling Nobel Prize winner
- Trent Reznor musician
- Johnny Rivers musician
- Nicholas Roosevelt diplomat
- Elizabeth Smart, author
- Ted Turner business executive
- Jean Varda author
- Cole Weston photographer
- Edward Weston photographer
- Vilmos Zsigmond cinematographer

== Highway 1 impact ==
Before the construction of California State Route 1, the California coast south of Carmel and north of San Simeon was one of the most remote regions in the state, rivaling at the time nearly any other region in the United States for its difficult access. At the turn of the 19th century, the 30 mi (48 km) trip from Monterey to the Pfeiffer Ranch in the Big Sur valley could take three days by wagon. It was a rough road that ended in present-day Big Sur Village and could be impassible in winter. There was no road beyond the Pfeiffer Ranch, only a horseback trail connecting the homesteads to the south. The ride from Pfeiffer Ranch to San Carpóforo canyon was about 60 miles (97 km) in a direct line, but about three times that by horseback. J. Smeaton Chase, who traveled on horseback up the coast in 1911, reported that a stagecoach carried passengers from Posts (then named Arbolado) to the Everett Hotel in Monterey on Mondays, Wednesdays, and Fridays.

The highway was first proposed by Dr. John L. D. Roberts, a physician who was summoned on April 21, 1894, to treat survivors of the wreck of the 493 tons (447 t; 440 long tons) S.S. Los Angeles (originally USRC Wayanda), which had run aground near the Point Sur Light Station about 25 miles (40 km) south of Carmel-by-the-Sea. The ride on his two-wheeled, horse-drawn cart took him 3 1/2 hours, a very fast trip for the day. Construction began in 1921, ceased for two years in 1926 when funding ran out, and after 18 years of construction, the Carmel–San Simeon Highway was completed in 1937. The route was incorporated into the state highway system and re-designated as Highway 1 in 1939.

The highway is a dominant feature of the Big Sur coast, providing the primary means of access and transportation. The Big Sur portion of Highway 1 is generally considered to include the 71-mile (114 km) segment adjoining the unincorporated region of Big Sur between Malpaso Creek near Carmel Highlands in the north and San Carpóforo Creek near San Simeon in the south.

Along with the ocean views, this winding, narrow road, often cut into the face of seaside cliffs, dominates the visitor's experience of Big Sur. The views, redwood forests, hiking, beaches, and other recreational opportunities have made Big Sur a destination for about 4.5 to 7 million people who live within a day's drive and for visitors from elsewhere in the world.

The highway has been closed more than 55 times by landslides, and in May 2017, a 2,000,000-cubic-foot (57,000 m^{3}) slide blocked the highway at Mud Creek, north of Salmon Creek near the San Luis Obispo County line, to just south of Gorda. The road was reopened on July 18, 2018, but is subject to closure during heavy storms.

== Big Sur land use ==
The policies protecting land used in Big Sur are some of the most restrictive local-use standards in California, and are widely regarded as one of the most restrictive development protections anywhere. The program protects viewsheds from the highway and many vantage points and severely restricts the density of development. About 60% of the coastal region is owned by governmental or private agencies which do not allow any development. The majority of the interior region is part of the Los Padres National Forest, Ventana Wilderness, Silver Peak Wilderness, or Fort Hunter Liggett. The area is protected by the Big Sur Local Coastal Plan, which preserves it as "open space, a small residential community, and agricultural ranching". Its intention is "preserving the environment and visual access to it, the policies of the local coastal plan are to minimize, or limit, all destination activities".

The unincorporated region encompassing Big Sur does not have specific boundaries, but is generally considered to include the 71-mile (114 km) segment of California State Route 1 between Malpaso Creek near Carmel Highlands in the north and San Carpóforo Creek near San Simeon in the south, as well as the entire Santa Lucia range between these creeks. The interior region is mostly uninhabited, while the coast remains relatively isolated and sparsely populated, with between 1,800 and 2,000 year-round residents and relatively few visitor accommodations scattered among the four small settlements.

== History ==
=== Native Americans ===
Archaeological evidence shows that the Esselen lived in Big Sur as early as 3500 BC, leading a nomadic, hunter-gatherer existence.

The native people hollowed mortar holes into large exposed rocks or boulders which they used to grind the acorns into flour. These can be found throughout the region. Arrows were made of cane and pointed with hardwood foreshafts. The tribes also used controlled burning techniques to increase tree growth and food production. The population was limited as the Santa Lucia Mountains made the area relatively inaccessible and long-term habitation a challenge. The population of the Esselen who lived in the Big Sur area are estimated from a few hundred to a thousand or more.

=== Spanish exploration and settlement ===
The first Europeans to see Big Sur were Spanish mariners led by Juan Cabrillo in 1542, who sailed up the coast without landing. When Cabrillo sailed by, he described the coastal range as "mountains which seem to reach the heavens, and the sea beats on them; sailing along close to land, it appears as though they would fall on the ships".

Two centuries passed before the Spaniards attempted to colonize the area. On September 13, 1769, an expedition led by Gaspar de Portolá were the first Europeans to enter the Big Sur region when they arrived at San Carpóforo Canyon near Ragged Point. While camping there, they were visited by six indigenous people who offered pinole and fish and received beads in exchange. They explored the coast ahead and concluded it was impassable. They were forced to turn inland up the steep arroyo. The march through the mountains was one of the most difficult portions of the expedition's journey. The Spanish were forced to "make a road with crowbar and pickaxe". Crespi wrote, "The mountains which enclose it are perilously steep, and all are inaccessible, not only for men but also for goats and deer." From a high peak near the San Antonio River, they could see nothing but mountains in every direction. They reached Monterey on October 1. When they attempted to explore further south, the scouts found their way blocked by "the same cliff that had forced us back from the shore and obliged us to travel through the mountains".

After the Spanish established the California missions in 1770, they baptized and forced the native population to labor at the missions. While living at the missions, the aboriginal population was exposed to diseases unknown to them, like smallpox and measles, for which they had no immunity, devastating the Native American population and their culture. Many of the remaining Native Americans assimilated with Spanish and Mexican ranchers in the nineteenth century.

In 1909, forest supervisors reported that three Indian families still lived within what was then known as the Monterey National Forest. The Encinale family of 16 members and the Quintana family with three members lived in the vicinity of The Indians (now known as Santa Lucia Memorial Park west of Ft. Hunger Liggett). The Mora family consisting of three members was living to the south along the Nacimiento-Ferguson Road.

=== Spanish ranchos ===
Along with the rest of Alta California, Big Sur became part of Mexico when it gained independence from Spain in 1821. But, due to its inaccessibility, only a few small portions of the Big Sur region were included in land grants given by Mexican governors José Figueroa and Juan Bautista Alvarado.

Rancho Tularcitos

Rancho Tularcitos, 26,581-acre (10,757 ha) of land, was granted in 1834 by Governor José Figueroa to Rafael Goméz. It was located in upper Carmel Valley along Tularcitos Creek.

Rancho San Francisquito

Rancho San Francisquito was a 8,813-acre (35.66 km^{2}) land grant given in 1835 by Governor José Castro to Catalina Manzanelli de Munrás. She was the wife of Esteban Munrás (1798–1850), a Monterey trader, amateur painter, and grantee of Rancho San Vicente. The grant was located in the upper Carmel Valley, inland and east of Rancho San Jose y Sur Chiquito.

Rancho Milpitas

Rancho Milpitas was a 43,281-acre (17,515 ha) land grant given in 1838 by governor Juan Alvarado to Ygnacio Pastor. The grant encompassed present-day Jolon and land to the west. When Pastor obtained title from the Public Land Commission in 1875, Faxon Atherton immediately purchased the land. By 1880, the James Brown Cattle Company owned and operated Rancho Milpitas and neighboring Rancho Los Ojitos. William Randolph Hearst's Piedmont Land and Cattle Company acquired the rancho in 1925. In 1940, in anticipation of the increased forces required in World War II, the U.S. War Department purchased the land from Hearst to create a troop training facility known as the Hunter Liggett Military Reservation.

Rancho El Sur

On July 30, 1834, Figueroa granted Rancho El Sur, two square leagues of land totalling 8,949-acres (3,622 ha), to Juan Bautista Alvarado. The grant extended from the Little Sur River to what became known as Cooper Point. Alvarado later traded Rancho El Sur for the more accessible Rancho Bolsa del Potrero y Moro Cojo in the northern Salinas Valley, owned by his uncle by marriage, Captain John B. R. Cooper. About one-half of Rancho El Sur is still an operating cattle ranch.

Rancho San Jose y Sur Chiquito

In 1839, Alvarado granted Rancho San Jose y Sur Chiquito, also about two square leagues of land totalling 8,876-acre (3,592 ha), to Marcelino Escobar, a prominent official of Monterey. The grant was bounded on the north by the Carmel River and on the south by Palo Colorado Canyon.

In 1848, two days after the discovery of gold at Sutter's Mill, Mexico ceded California to the United States as a result of the Mexican–American War.

=== First survey ===
During the first survey of the coast conducted by the U.S. Coast Survey in 1886, the surveyor reported:

The country between the shoreline and the Coast Range of mountains, running parallel with the shoreline from San Carpojoro to Point Sur is probably the roughest piece of coastline on the whole Pacific coast of the United States from San Diego to Cape Flattery.

The highest peaks of the crest of the coast range are located at an average distance from the coast of three and a half miles [5.6 km]. In this distance they rise to elevations of from three thousand six hundred to five thousand feet [1,100 to 1,500 m] above the sea-level. From San Carpoforo Creek to Pfeiffer's Point, a distance of 54 miles (87 km), the shore-line is iron-bound coast with no possible chance of getting from the hills to the shore-line and back except at the mouths of the creeks and at such places as Coxe's Hole and Slate's Hot Springs, where there are short stretches of sandy and rocky beaches from fifty to one hundred yards [meters] in length. In many places the sea bluffs are perpendicular, and rise from one thousand to one thousand five hundred feet [300 to 460 m] above the sea. The country is cut up by deep cañons [canyons], walled in with high and precipitous bluffs. These cañons are densely wooded with redwood, oak, and yellow and silver pine timber.

The redwood trees are from three to six feet [0.91 to 1.83 m] in diameter and from one hundred to one hundred and fifty feet high [30 to 46 m]. The oaks and pines are of the same average dimensions. Beautiful streams of clear cold water, filled with an abundance of salmon or trout, are to be found in all the canyons. The spurs running from the summits of the range to the ocean bluffs are covered with a dense growth of brush and scattering clumps of oak and pine timber. The chaparral is very thick, and in many places grows to a height of ten or fifteen feet [3–5 m] ... The spurs, slopes, and canons are impenetrable ...

=== Homesteaders ===
The first known European settler in Big Sur was John Davis who in 1853 built a cabin near the present-day site of the Mount Manuel Trail trailhead. In 1868, Native Americans Manual and Florence Innocenti bought Davis' cabin and land for $50.

John Bautista Rogers Cooper, born John Rogers Cooper, was a Yankee from the British Channel Islands who arrived in Monterey in 1823. He became a Mexican citizen, converted to Catholicism, and was given a Spanish name at his baptism. He married Native American Encarnacion Vallejo and acquired considerable land, including Rancho El Sur, on which he had a cabin built in April or May 1861. The Cooper Cabin is the oldest surviving structure in Big Sur.

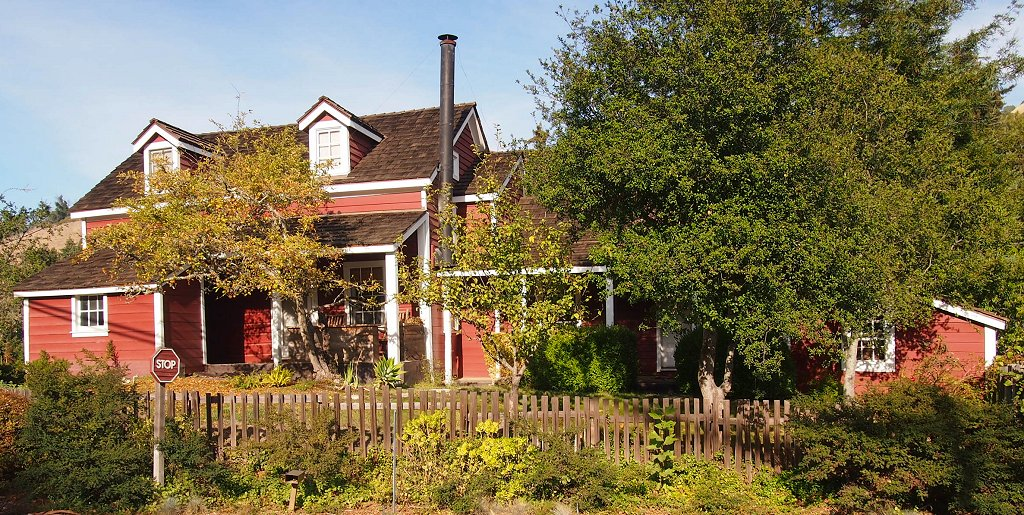
Joseph W. Post House, a historic structure built in 1867–1877

William B. Post arrived in California in 1848 and was the foreman of the Soberanes Ranch when he built a single-room cabin in 1867. His son added to it in 1877, when the family moved there full-time. The Post House is a historic landmark and is on the grounds of the Ventana Inn resort.

Michael Pfeiffer, wife Barbara Laquet, and four children arrived in Big Sur in 1869 to settle on the south coast. After reaching Sycamore Canyon, they found it to their liking and decided to stay. He filed a land patent on January 20, 1883, claiming two sections of land he already resided on near and immediately north of the mouth of Sycamore Canyon. They had six more children later on.

Another important pioneer-era historic resource is the Swetnam / Trotter House, a late 19th-century dwelling located at the mouth of Palo Colorado Canyon.

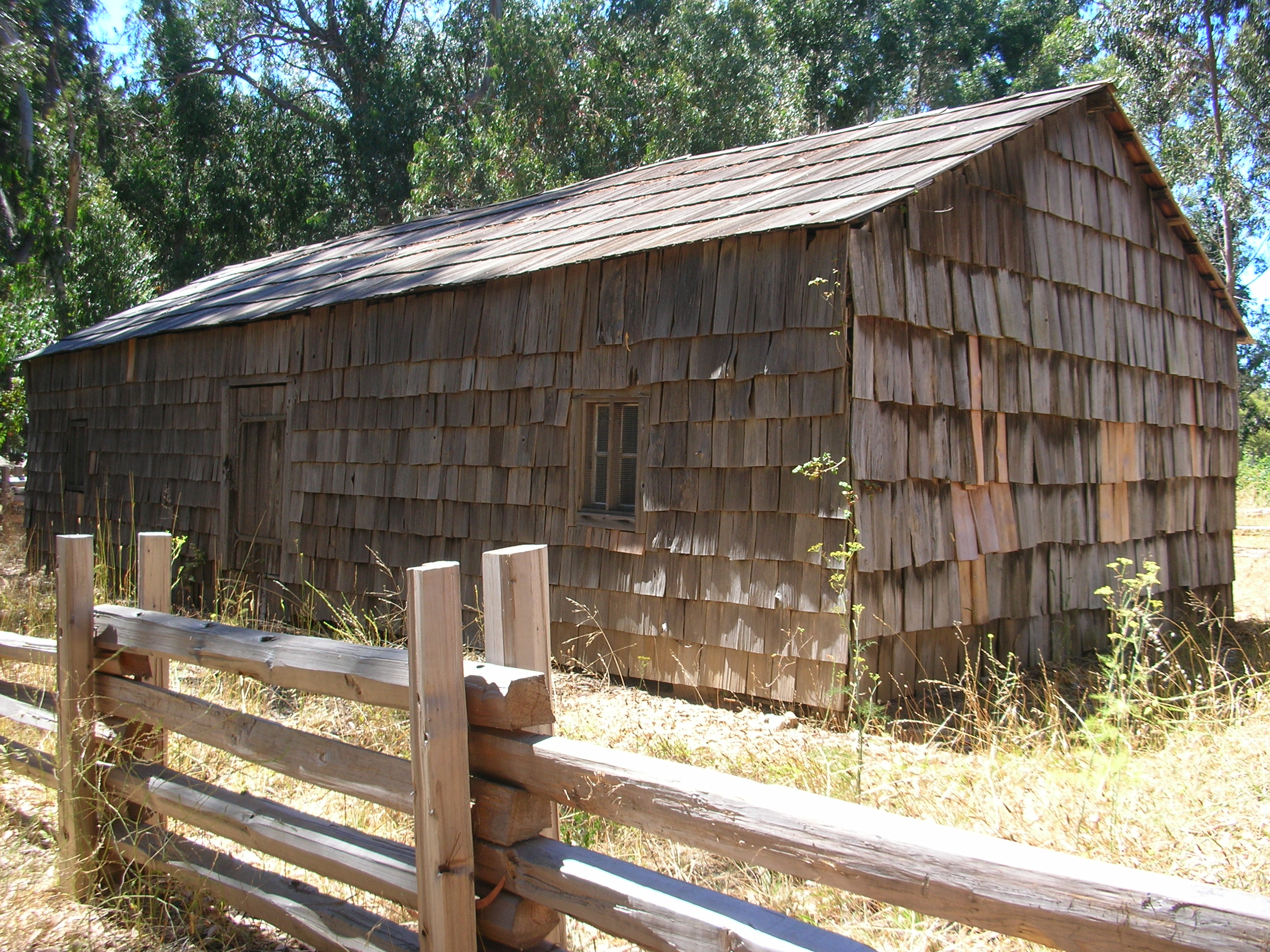
The Cooper Cabin is the oldest structure on the Big Sur coast, built in 1861 for Captain J.B.R. Cooper.

After the passage of the federal Homestead Act in 1862, a few hardy settlers were drawn by the promise of free 160-acre (65 ha) parcels. After the claimant filed for the land, they had gained full ownership after five years of residence or by paying $1.50 per acre within six months. Each claim was for 160 acres, a quarter section of free government land.

Other settlers included William F. Notley, who homesteaded at the mouth of Palo Colorado Canyon in 1891. He began harvesting tanoak bark from the canyon, a lucrative source of income at the time. Notley's Landing is named after him. Isaac Swetnam worked for Notley and built a house at the mouth of Palo Colorado Canyon, which as of 2018 is still a residence. Sam Trotter, who also worked for Notley, later bought Swetnam's house. He married Adelaide Pfeiffer, the daughter of Micheal Pfeiffer, and they raised a family there from 1906 to 1923.

William and Sarah (Barnes) Plaskett and their family settled in Pacific Valley in 1869. They built several homes and a saw mill. Homesteader John Junge built a one-room redwood cabin in 1920. The John Little State Natural Reserve straddling the mouth of Lime Creek preserves the original 1917 cabin of conservationist Elizabeth K. Livermore.

Many other local sites retain names from settlers during this period: Bottcher, Cooper's Point, Gamboa, Anderson, Partington, Dani, Harlans, McQuades, Ross, and McWay are a few of the place names. Wilber Harlan, a native of Indiana, homesteaded near Lucia in 1885. His family descendants are as of 2017 still operating the Lucia Lodge.

=== Industrial era and gold rush ===
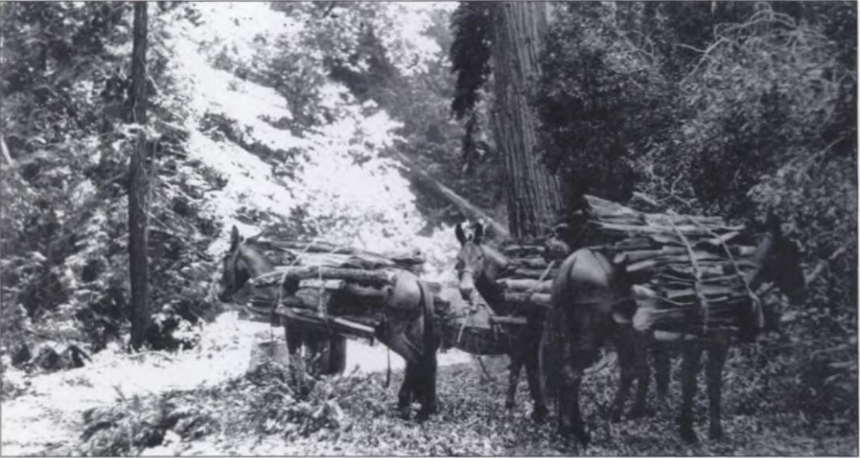
A major forest product of the Big Sur coast was the bark of Tanbark Oak.

Bixby Landing in 1911 was used to transport products to and from ships offshore.

The local industries provided more work and supported a larger population than it does today. Jobs included harvesting lumber and tanoak bark, gold mining, and limestone processing.

From the 1860s through the start of the twentieth century, lumbermen cut down most of the readily accessible coast redwoods. Redwood harvesting further inland was always limited by the rugged terrain and difficulty in transporting the lumber to market. Redwood was cut in large amounts for use onsite in limestone kilns. Two companies operated large-scale limestone extraction and processing. The Monterey Lime Company operated near Long Ridge, east of Bixby Creek, and the Rockland Lime and Lumber Company operated a kiln at what later became known Limekiln Creek in the south.

William F. Notley was one of the first to harvest the bark of the Tanbark Oak from the Little Sur River canyon. Tanbark was used to manufacture tannic acid, necessary to the growing leather tanning industry located in Santa Cruz, and to preserve fish nets. The tanbark was harvested from the isolated trees inland, left to dry, corded, and brought out on mules or hauled out on "go-devils". The go-devil was a wagon with two wheels on the front, while the rear had rails for pulling. A point on the Palo Colorado road is still nicknamed "The Hoist" because of the very steep road which required wagon-loads of tanbark and lumber to be hoisted by block and tackle hitched to oxen. The old block and tackle on a beam is still mounted between mailboxes.

The 30 mi (48 km) trip from Monterey to the Pfeiffer Ranch usually took all day by wagon. If the road was in bad shape, the stage driver only took a lightweight spring wagon. The rough road ended at the Pfeiffer Resort on the Big Sur River. It could be impassible in winter. Notley constructed a dog-hole port at the mouth of the Palo Colorado River, and a small village grew up from 1898 to 1907 around at what is known today as Notley's Landing. Bixby built a sawmill on his property, and to get the lumber and lime to market, built a similar doghole port at the mouth of what was then known as Mill's Creek, today as Bixby Creek. The tanbark was loaded by cable and a chute onto waiting vessels anchored offshore. In 1889, as much as 50,000 cords of tanbark were hauled out from the Little Sur River and Big Sur River watersheds. A cable hoist and chute were used to move goods to and from schooners anchored just offshore. Near the start of the 20th century, the tan oak trees were becoming seriously depleted, which slowly led to the demise of the industries they had created. Only the foundations of the doghole ports remain today.

In the 1880s, gold was found in the Los Burros District at Alder Creek in the mountains east of present-day Gorda. The gold rush town of Manchester at 35.880°N 121.392°W existed for a few short years. The town boasted a population of 200, four stores, a restaurant, five saloons, a dance hall, and a hotel, but it was abandoned soon after the start of the twentieth century and burned to the ground in 1909. Miners extracted about $150,000 in gold (about $5.81 million in 2025) during the mine's existence.

Residents also received supplies by steamship that would make a trip once a year in the fall from San Francisco to Big Sur to drop off supplies that could not be transported by wagon. In 1894, ranch owners Post, Pfeiffer, and Castro hired the Pacific Coast Steamship Company's 180 feet (55 m) steamer Bonita to bring lumber and seed oats to the mouth of the Big Sur River and Big Creek, north of Lucia. Lightering was used to transport freight to and from the beach. A large crowd gathered to receive supplies from and to load butter, honey, beans, wool, hides, and other products onto the ship.

In the late 1800s, the Ventana Power Company operated a sawmill near present-day Pfeiffer Big Sur State Park. They began planning to build a dam on the Big Sur River just downstream of the confluence of Ventana Creek and the Big Sur River. They hoped to sell the electricity to the City of Monterey. They built a diversion channel along the Big Sur River, but the 1906 San Francisco earthquake bankrupted the company and they abandoned the project. The stonework from the diversion channel is still visible. Few other signs of this brief industrial period are visible. The rugged, isolated terrain kept out all but the sturdiest and most self-sufficient settlers. Travelers who ventured south of the Post Ranch rode horseback along trails that connected the various homesteaders along the coast.

The 1900 Monterey County voting register indicates 61 male voters in the Big Sur area. The majority (47) were either farmers or ranchers. Other trades included a gardener, apiarist, fruit grower, woodsman, laborer, lighthouse keeper, blacksmith, surveyor, miner, and teamster. Lumber-related occupations include bark peelers, woodchoppers, and wood overseers.

== Geography ==
=== Geology ===
The Santa Lucia Mountain Range, which dominates the Big Sur region, is 140 miles (230 km) long, extending from Carmel in the north to the Cuyama River in San Luis Obispo County. The range is never more than 11 miles (18 km) from the coast.

The Santa Lucia Mountains are characterized by extremely steep slopes, all associated with watersheds flowing directly or indirectly into the Pacific Ocean. The range forms the steepest coastal slope in the contiguous United States. The mountains are of recent tectonic origin, and its rugged, steep, and dissected deep stream canyons. The general trend of the range is northwest–southeast, paralleling the numerous faults that transect the area.

The topography is complex, however, reflecting active uplift and deformation, a variety of lithological types, rapidly incising stream networks, and highly unstable slopes. Stream channels and hill slopes are very steep, with average hill slope gradients exceeding 60% in some interior watersheds. The coastal side of the range rises directly from the shoreline, with oceanfront ridges rising directly 4,000 to 5,000 feet (1,200 to 1,500 m) to the crest of the coastal range. Big Sur's Cone Peak, at an elevation of 5,155 feet (1,571 m), is only 3 miles (4.8 km) from the ocean and is the tallest coastal mountain in the contiguous United States. Cone Peak is sometimes referred to as the "Yosemite of the Coast" because its steep rise from the ocean resembles the dramatic granite walls of Yosemite Valley.

The basement rocks of the Santa Lucia Range contain Mesozoic Franciscan and Salinian Block rocks. The Franciscan complex is composed of greywacke sandstone and greenstone, with serpentinite bodies and other Ultramafic rocks present. Small areas of marble and limestone lenses form resistant outcrops that are prominent landscape features, often white to light gray. The Salinian block is made up of highly fractured, and deeply weathered meta-sediments, especially biotite schist and gneiss, intruded by plutonic (granitic) rocks such as quartz diorite and granodiorite. Both formations have been disrupted and tectonically slivered by motion on the San Andreas and associated fault systems. The Palo Colorado and Church Creek faults are prominent features influencing the linear northwest–southeast alignment of primary drainages.

=== Marine influence ===
Along with much of the central and northern California coast, Big Sur frequently has dense fog in summer. Fog and lack of precipitation during the summer both result from the North Pacific High's presence offshore during that season. The high-pressure cell inhibits rainfall and generates northwesterly airflow. These prevailing summer winds from the northwest drive the ocean surface water slightly offshore (through the Ekman effect) which generates an upwelling of colder subsurface water. Warm surface air blowing over cold upwelling ocean water close to the coast is cooled to create a surface-based inversion. Summer fog is common below about 2,000 feet (610 m) elevation. During 2014 and 2015, researchers recorded summer seasonal totals of 125 centimetres (49 in) and 31 centimetres (12 in) of fog water drip under open shrub canopies. They concluded that precipitation from fog dripping into the soils under coastal shrub canopies can be as much as 50% of annual average rainfall rates. The fog usually moves out to sea during the day and closes in at night, but sometimes heavy fog blankets the coast all day.

== Wildfires ==
=== Historic fires ===
Fire plays a key role in the ecology of the upper slopes of the Big Sur region's mountains where chaparral dominates the landscape. It is known that Native Americans burned chaparral to increase food production and promote grasslands for textiles, but little is known about the natural frequency of fire in the Santa Lucia Mountains. A study of fire scars on sugar pines on Junipero Serra Peak found that at least six fires had burned the region between 1790 and 1901. During the Spanish and Mexican era the Native Americans set fires regularly in coastal and valley grasslands to control brush growth and reduce fire risk. The European homesteaders followed that tradition and set controlled burns every winter when conditions were right.

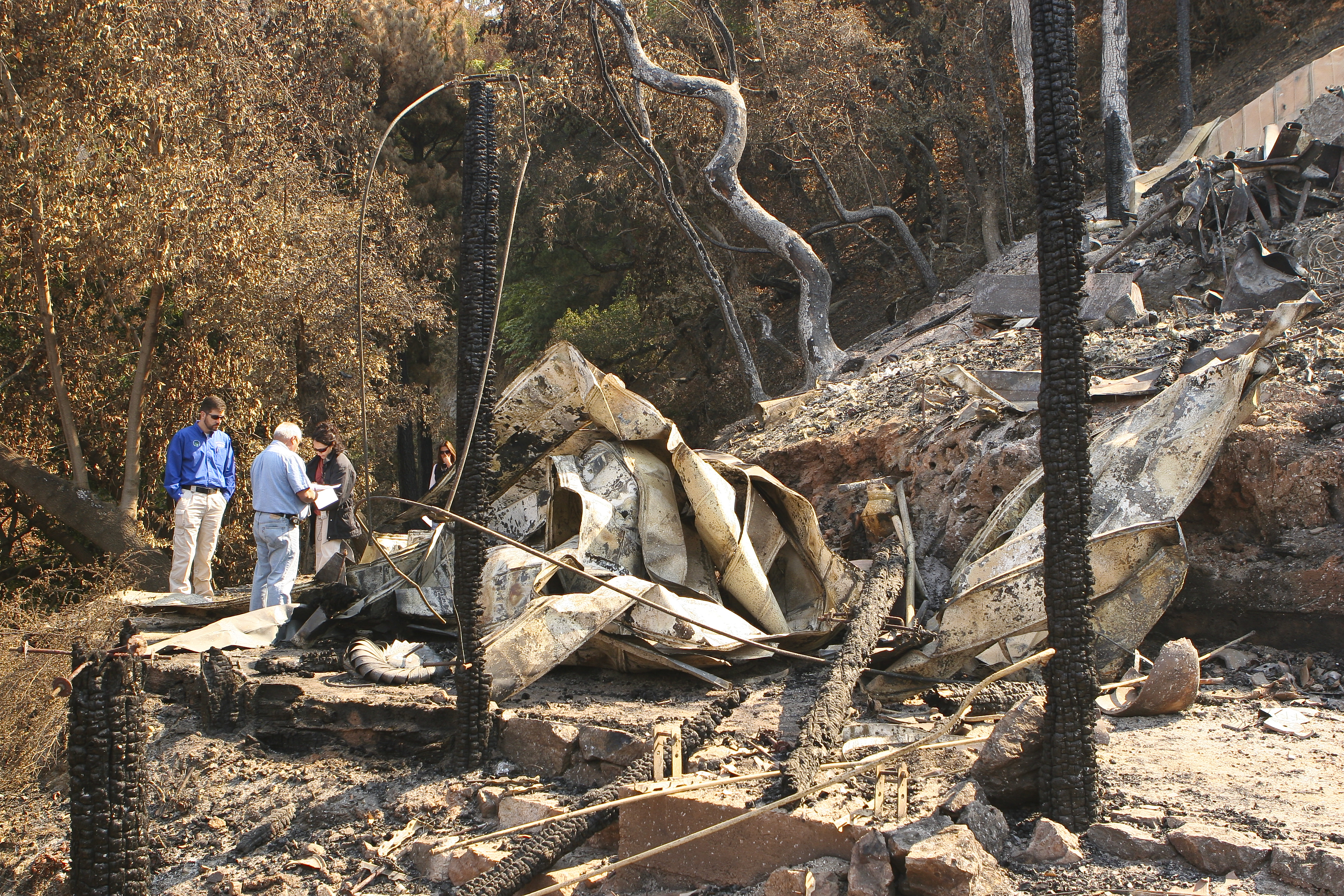
FEMA team assesses wildfire damage after the Basin Fire, 2008

Following the depopulation of the Native Americans from the region in the late 1800s, there have been several very large fires in the Big Sur area. In 1894, a fire burned for weeks through the upper watersheds of all of the major streams in the Big Sur region. Another large fire in 1898 burned without any effort by the few residents to put it out, except to save their buildings. In 1903, a fire started by an untended campfire near Chews Ridge burned a path 6 miles (9.7 km) wide to the coast over three months. In 1906, a fire that began in Palo Colorado Canyon from the embers of a campfire burned 230 mi^{2} (600 km^{2}) over 5 weeks and was finally extinguished by the first rainfall of the season. The number of fires declined when the U.S. Forest Service began managing the land in 1907.

=== Modern wildfires ===
In recent history, the area was struck by the Molera Fire in 1972, which resulted in flooding and mud flows in the Big Sur River valley that buried portions of several buildings the following winter. The area was burned by Marble Cone Fire in 1977, the Rat Creek Gorda Complex Fire in 1985, the Kirk Complex Fire in 1999, the Basin Complex Fire in 2008, the Pfeiffer Fire in December 2013, and the Soberanes Fire in 2016.

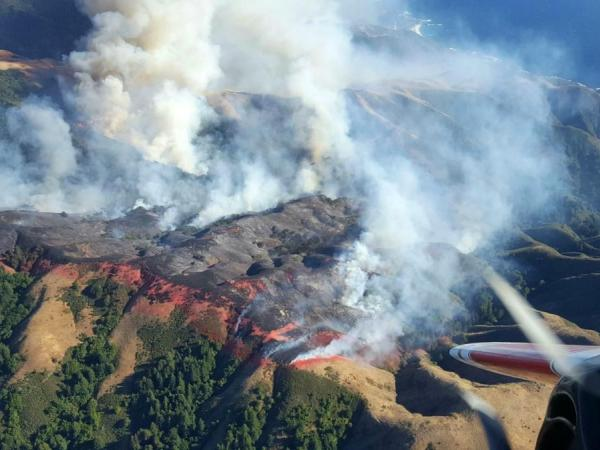
The 2016 Soberanes fire tops a ridge covered in fire retardant adjacent to the Pacific Ocean.

The Basin Complex Fire forced an eight-day evacuation of Big Sur and the closure of Highway 1, beginning just before the July 4, 2008 holiday weekend. The fire, which burned over 200 mi^{2} (520 km^{2}), represented the largest of many lightning-caused wildfires that had broken out throughout California during the same period. Although the fire caused no loss of life, it destroyed 27 homes, and the tourist-dependent economy lost about a third of its expected summer revenue. The Pfeiffer Fire from December 17 to 20, 2013 burned 1.4 mi^{2} (3.6 km^{2}) and destroyed 34 homes in an area near Pfeiffer Ridge Road and Sycamore Canyon Road.

The July 2016 Soberanes Fire was caused by unknown individuals who started and lost control of an illegal campfire in the Garrapata Creek watershed. After it burned 57 homes in the Garrapata and Palo Colorado Canyon areas, firefighters were able to build lines around parts of the Big Sur community. A bulldozer operator was killed when his equipment overturned during night operations in Palo Colorado Canyon.

Coast residents east of Highway 1 were required to evacuate for short periods, and Highway 1 was shut down at intervals over several days to allow firefighters to conduct backfire operations. Visitors avoided the area and tourism revenue was impacted for several weeks.

In April, 2022, Ivan Gomez was convicted of 16 felony counts including arson for purposefully starting a fire near Lime Creek on August 18, 2020. The Dolan Fire killed a dozen Critically Endangered California Condors when it burned through the 80 acres (32 ha) Big Sur Condor Sanctuary operated by the Ventana Wildlife Society of Monterey. The 195-square-mile (510-square-kilometer) fire was not fully contained until December 31, more than four months after it started.

=== Effect on Redwoods ===
In the lower elevations and canyons, the California Redwood is often found. Its thick bark, along with foliage that starts high above the ground, protect the species from both fire and insect damage, contributing to the coast redwood's longevity. Fire appears to benefit redwoods by removing competitive species. A 2010 study compared post-wildfire survival and regeneration of redwood and associated species. It concluded that fires of all severity increase the relative abundance of redwood and higher-severity fires provide the greatest benefit.

== Climate ==
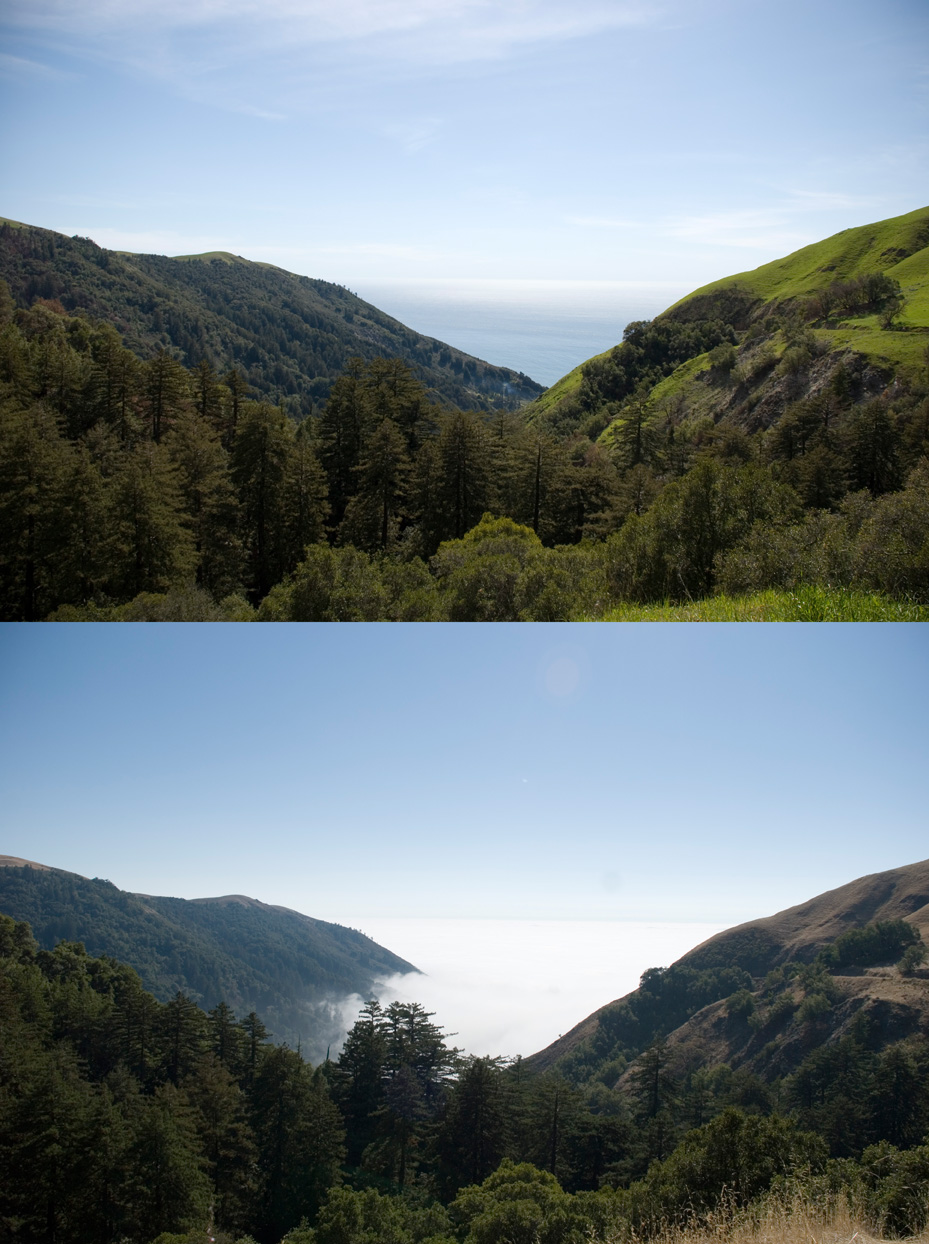
Upper image from March and lower image from October, showing a typical fog bank nearly 1,000 feet (300 m) thick. Also illustrating the difference in vegetation between the winter rainy season and dry early fall.

Big Sur typically enjoys a mild Mediterranean climate, with a sunny, dry summer and fall, and cool, wet winter. Coastal temperatures range from the 50s at night to the 70s by day (Fahrenheit) from June through October, and in the 40s to 60s from November through May. Further inland, away from the ocean's moderating influence, temperatures are much more variable. The weather varies widely due to the influence of the jagged topography, creating many microclimates.

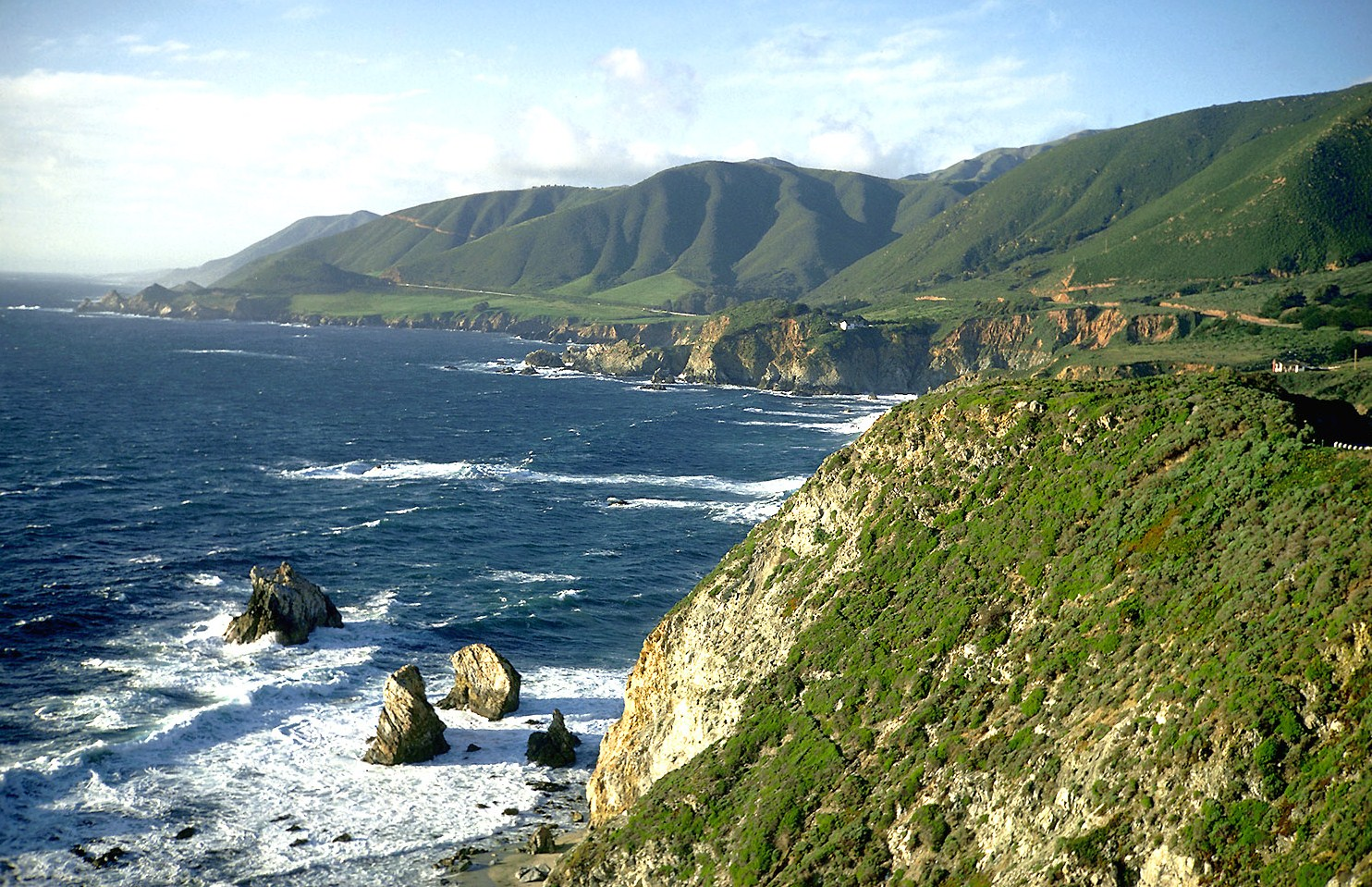
Big Sur Coast in April 1969 after a wet winter

The record maximum temperature was 111 °F (43.9 °C) on September 7, 2020, and the record low was 26 °F (−3.3 °C), recorded on February 9, 2009.

During the winter, Big Sur experiences some of the heaviest rainfall in California. More than 70 percent of the rain falls from December through March. The summer is generally dry. The Santa Lucia range rises to more than 5,800 ft (1760 m), and the amount of rainfall greatly increases as the elevation rises and cools the air, but rainfall amounts decrease sharply in the rain shadow of the coastal mountains. Scientists estimate that about 90 in. (230 cm) falls on average near the ridge tops. But actual totals vary considerably. Snowfall is rare on the coast, but is common in the winter months on the higher ridges of the Santa Lucia Range.

Monterey County maintains a remote rain gauge for flood prediction on Mining Ridge at 4,000 ft (1200 m) about 4 miles (6.4 km) north-east of Cone Peak. The gauge frequently receives more rain than any gauge in the Monterey and San Francisco Bay Areas. The wettest winter season was 1982–1983, when it rained more than 178 in. (452 cm) but the total is unknown because the rain gauge failed at that point. The wettest calendar year on record was 1982–83, when it rained 88.85 inches (2,257 mm).

The month with the greatest rain fall total was December 1955 when it rained a record 27.21 inches (691 mm). At Pfeiffer–Big Sur State Park on the coast, rainfall averaged about 43 in. (109 cm) annually from 1914 to 1987. In 1975–1976, it rained only 15 in. (39 cm) at the park, compared to 85 in. (216 cm) in 1982–1983.

Climate data for Big Sur, California (1991–2020 normals, extremes 1993–present)
Month	Jan	Feb	Mar	Apr	May	Jun	Jul	Aug	Sep	Oct	Nov	Dec	Year
Record high °F (°C)	81 (27)	85 (29)	88 (31)	98 (37)	96 (36)	102 (39)	103 (39)	101 (38)	111 (44)	102 (39)	90 (32)	78 (26)	111 (44)
Mean maximum °F (°C)	73.1 (22.8)	74.1 (23.4)	78.2 (25.7)	83.9 (28.8)	85.9 (29.9)	90.0 (32.2)	90.5 (32.5)	92.1 (33.4)	93.3 (34.1)	90.1 (32.3)	79.6 (26.4)	69.8 (21.0)	98.4 (36.9)
Mean daily maximum °F (°C)	60.5 (15.8)	61.1 (16.2)	64.2 (17.9)	67.3 (19.6)	70.5 (21.4)	74.2 (23.4)	75.4 (24.1)	77.4 (25.2)	76.8 (24.9)	73.5 (23.1)	65.3 (18.5)	59.3 (15.2)	68.8 (20.4)
Daily mean °F (°C)	51.4 (10.8)	51.9 (11.1)	53.7 (12.1)	55.4 (13.0)	58.0 (14.4)	61.1 (16.2)	63.0 (17.2)	63.8 (17.7)	63.5 (17.5)	61.0 (16.1)	55.3 (12.9)	50.9 (10.5)	57.4 (14.1)
Mean daily minimum °F (°C)	42.4 (5.8)	42.8 (6.0)	43.3 (6.3)	43.5 (6.4)	45.5 (7.5)	48.0 (8.9)	50.5 (10.3)	50.1 (10.1)	50.1 (10.1)	48.5 (9.2)	45.4 (7.4)	42.5 (5.8)	46.1 (7.8)
Mean minimum °F (°C)	33.8 (1.0)	34.0 (1.1)	34.8 (1.6)	35.3 (1.8)	39.0 (3.9)	41.1 (5.1)	43.7 (6.5)	43.9 (6.6)	42.5 (5.8)	39.8 (4.3)	36.7 (2.6)	33.8 (1.0)	30.1 (−1.1)
Record low °F (°C)	27 (−3)	26 (−3)	27 (−3)	28 (−2)	35 (2)	37 (3)	41 (5)	40 (4)	39 (4)	31 (−1)	28 (−2)	27 (−3)	26 (−3)
Average precipitation inches (mm)	9.48 (241)	8.59 (218)	6.72 (171)	2.94 (75)	1.15 (29)	0.20 (5.1)	0.06 (1.5)	0.05 (1.3)	0.13 (3.3)	1.88 (48)	4.16 (106)	9.18 (233)	44.54 (1,131)
Average precipitation days (≥ 0.01 in)	10.7	11.2	10.2	6.3	3.7	0.8	0.3	0.4	0.7	3.0	6.9	10.6	64.8
Source: NOAA

== Flora and fauna ==
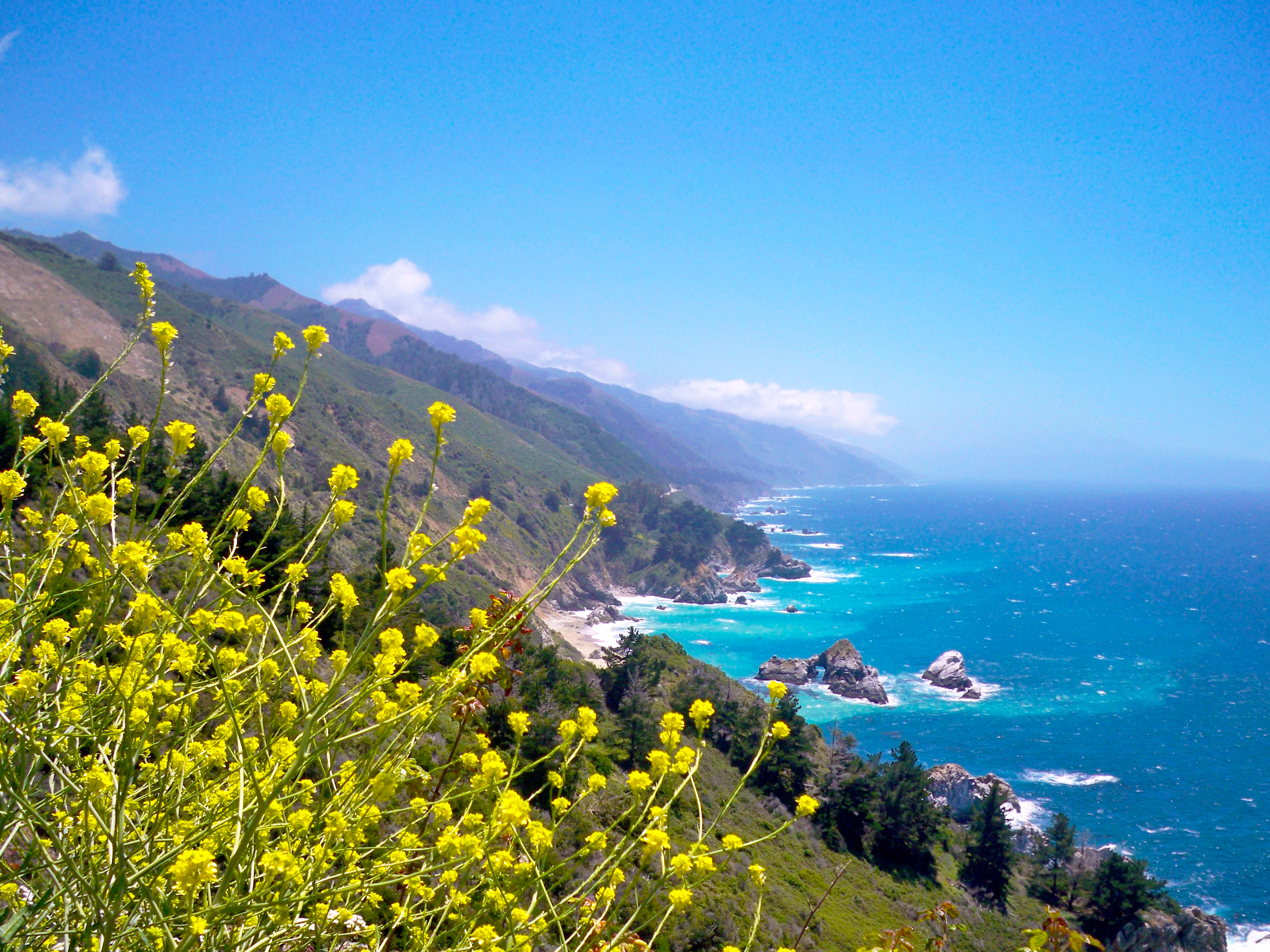
Big Sur coast looking south near Julia Pfeiffer Burns State Park

The many climates of Big Sur result in great biodiversity, including many rare and endangered species such as the wild orchid Piperia yadonii, which is found only on the Monterey Peninsula and on Rocky Ridge in the Los Padres forest. Arid, dusty chaparral-covered hills exist within walking distance of lush riparian woodland. Fort Hunter-Liggett is host to about one-fourth of all Tule elk found in California and provides roosting places for bald eagles and endangered condors.

=== Southern limit of redwood trees ===
The high coastal mountains trap moisture from the clouds: fog in summer, rain, and snow in winter creating a favorable environment for the coast redwood (Sequoia sempervirens) trees found in the Big Sur region. They are found near the ocean in canyon bottoms or inland canyons alongside creeks and in other areas that meet its requirements for cooler temperatures and moisture. Due to drier conditions, trees in the Big Sur region only grow about 200 feet (61 m) tall, smaller than specimens found to the north.

The redwood trees in Big Sur are the remnant of much larger groves. Many old-growth trees were cut by the Ventana Power Company which operated a sawmill near present-day Pfeiffer Big Sur State Park from the late 1800s through 1906 when its operations were bankrupted by the 1906 San Francisco earthquake. When John and Florence Pfeiffer opened Pfeiffer's Ranch Resort in 1910, they built guest cabins from lumber cut using the mill. The mill was resurrected when Highway 1 was constructed during the 1920s. It supplied lumber for housing built for workers.

While many trees were harvested, several inaccessible locations were never logged. A large grove of trees is found along the north fork of the Little Sur River. William Randolph Hearst was interested in preserving the uncut redwood forest, and on November 18, 1921, he purchased about 1,445 acres (585 ha) from the Eberhard and Kron Tanning Company of Santa Cruz for about $50,000. He later donated the land to the Monterey Bay Area Council of the Boy Scouts of America, who completed the construction of Camp Pico Blanco in 1954.

In 2008, scientist J. Michael Fay published a map of the old growth redwoods based on his transect of the entire redwood range. The southernmost naturally occurring grove of redwoods is found within the Big Sur region in the Southern Redwood Botanical Area, a 17 acres (6.9 ha) reserve located in the Little Redwood Gulch watershed adjacent to the Silver Peak Wilderness. It is just north of the Salmon Creek trailhead. The southernmost tree is about 15 feet (4.6 m) from Highway 1 at the approximate coordinates 35°49′42″N 121°23′14″W

=== Plant species ===
The rare Santa Lucia fir (Abies bracteata) is found only in the Santa Lucia mountains. A common "foreign" species is the Monterey pine (Pinus radiata), which was uncommon in Big Sur until the late nineteenth century, though its major native habitat is only a few miles upwind on the Monterey Peninsula when many homeowners began to plant the quick-growing tree as a windbreak. There are many broadleaved trees as well, such as the tanoak (Lithocarpus densiflorus), coast live oak (Quercus agrifolia), and California bay laurel (Umbellularia californica). In the rain shadow, the forests disappear and the vegetation becomes open oak woodland, then transitions into the more familiar fire-tolerant California chaparral scrub.

=== Wildlife ===
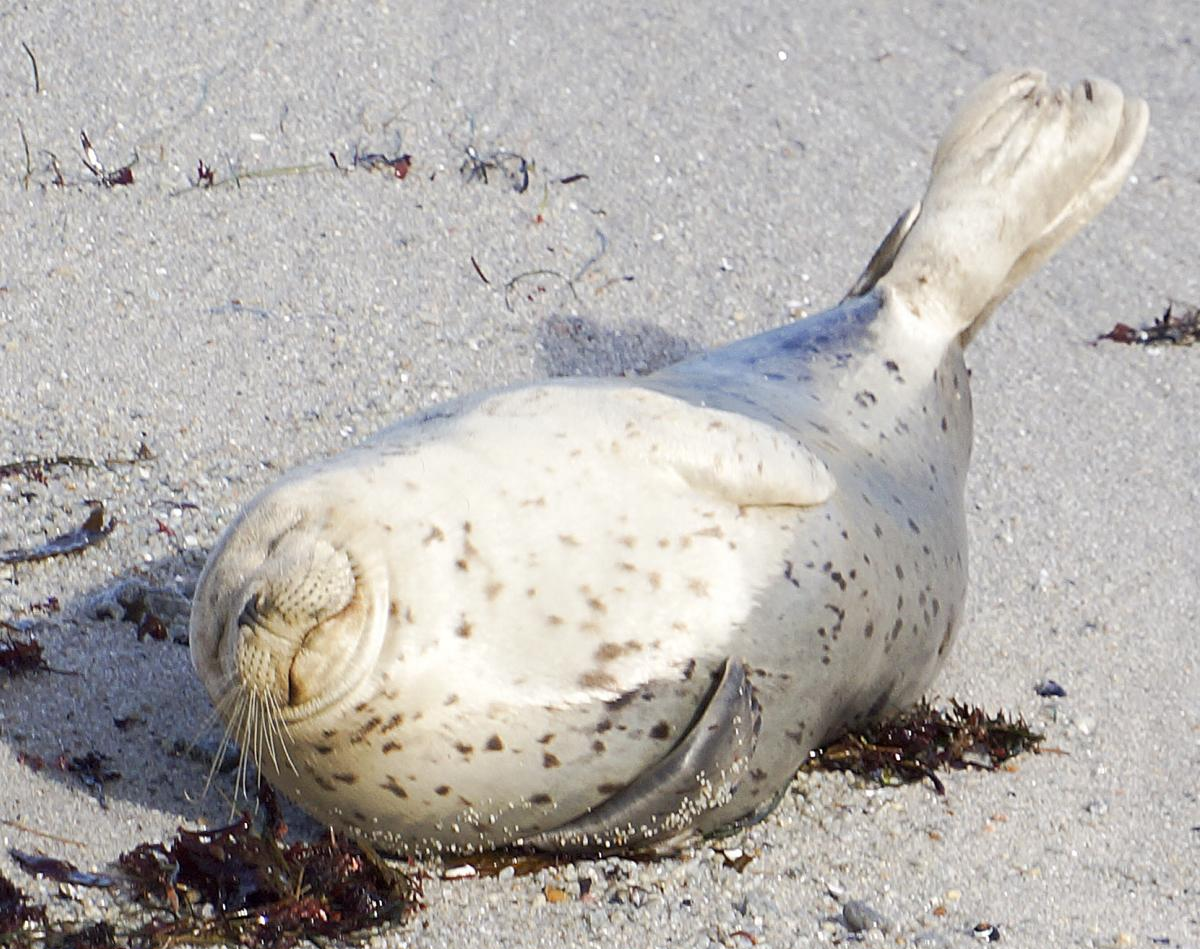
A harbor seal on a Big Sur beach

The Big Sur River watershed provides habitat for mountain lion, deer, fox, coyotes, and non-native wild boars. The boars, of Russian stock, were introduced in the 1920s by George Gordon Moore, the owner of Rancho San Carlos. Because most of the upper reaches of the Big Sur River watershed are within the Los Padres National Forest and the Ventana Wilderness, much of the river is in pristine condition.

Former Grizzly bear range

The region was historically populated by California grizzly bears. During the Spanish period of California history, the Spaniards rarely entered the area, except to capture runaway Mission Indians or to hunt grizzly bears that ate their livestock. The Mexican settlers captured bears for Monterey's bear and bull fights and they also sold their skins for 6 to 10 pesos to trading ships that visited Monterey. Bear Trap Canyon near Bixby Creek was one of their favorite sites for trapping grizzly bears.

The California grizzly bear (Ursus arctos californicus) was heavier and larger than grizzly bears found elsewhere in the continental United States. Malcolm Margolin in The Ohlone Way wrote that "These enormous bears were everywhere, feeding on berries, lumbering along the beaches, congregating beneath oak trees during acorn season, and stationed along nearly every stream and creek during the annual runs of salmon and steelhead." Grizzly bears presented a serious threat to human beings armed with only a bow and arrows and the Native Americans used to avoid them whenever possible.

The Monterey Herald noted on July 4, 1874:

Last Monday, Captain A. Smith, who resides about ten miles from town, in the Carmel Valley, succeeded in poisoning a large grizzly bear. Bruin had been annoying the neighborhood by destroying cattle, etc., for several years past, and all efforts to exterminate him seem futile. In some manner, however, he was induced to partake of that "cold pizen" the captain had prepared for his special benefit. He is not likely to repeat his experiment.

There are remnants of a grizzly bear trap within Palo Corona Regional Park east of Point Lobos in a grove of redwood trees next to a creek.

European settlers paid bounties on the bears who regularly preyed on livestock until the early 20th century. Absolom (Rocky) Beasley hunted grizzly bears throughout the Santa Lucia Range and claimed to have killed 139 bears in his lifetime. The Pfeiffer family would fill a bait ball of swine entrails with strychnine and hang it from a tree. They wrote that the last grizzly bear was seen in Monterey County in 1941 on the Cooper Ranch near the mouth of the Little Sur River. Other sources report that last California grizzly was seen in 1924.

Since about 1980, American black bears have been sighted in the area, likely expanding their range from southern California and filling in the ecological niche left when the grizzly bear was exterminated.

Steelhead

The California Department of Fish and Game says the Little Sur River is the "most important spawning stream for Steelhead" distinct population segment on the Central Coast, where the fish is listed as threatened. and that it "is one of the best steelhead streams in the county". The Big Sur River is also a key habitat for the steelhead.

A US fisheries service report estimates that the number of trout in the entire south-central coast area—including the Pajaro River, Salinas River, Carmel River, Big Sur River, and Little Sur River—have dwindled from about 4,750 fish in 1965 to about 800 in 2005.

Numerous fauna are found in the Big Sur region. Among amphibians the California giant salamander (Dicamptodon ensatus) is found here, which point marks the southern extent of its range.

California condor

The California condor (Gymnogyps californianus) is a critically endangered species that was near extinction when the remaining wild birds were captured. A captive breeding program was begun in 1987. The Ventana Wildlife Society acquired 80 acres near Anderson Canyon that it used for a captive breeding program. After some success, a few birds were released in 1991 and 1992 in Big Sur, and again in 1996 in Arizona near the Grand Canyon.

In 1997, the Ventana Wildlife Society began releasing captive-bred California Condors in Big Sur. The birds take six years to mature before they can produce offspring, and a nest was discovered in a redwood tree in 2006. This was the first time in more than 100 years in which a pair of California condors had been seen nesting in Northern California. The repopulation effort has been successful in part because a significant portion of the birds' diet includes carcasses of large sea creatures that have washed ashore, which are unlikely to be contaminated with lead, the principal cause of the bird's mortality.

As of July 2014, the Ventana Wildlife Society managed 34 free-flying condors. There were part of a total population of 437 condors spread over California, Baja California and Arizona, of which 232 are wild birds and 205 are in captivity.

=== Marine protected areas ===
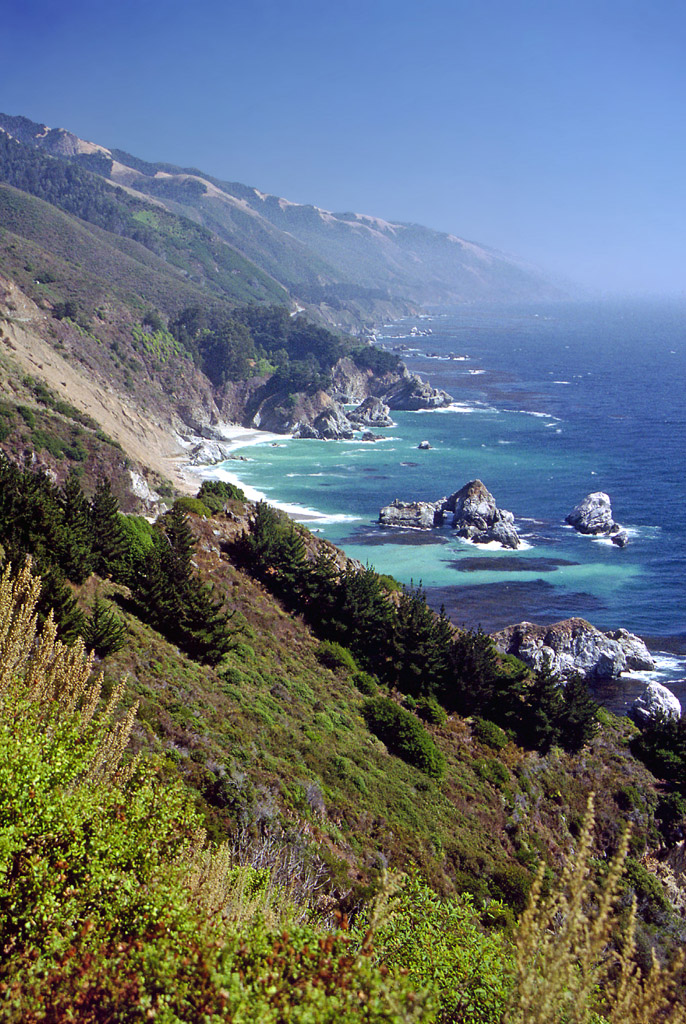
Coast view of the Big Creek State Marine Reserve

The off-shore region of the Big Sur Coast is protected by the Monterey Bay National Marine Sanctuary. Within that sanctuary are other conservation areas and parks. The onshore topography that drops abruptly into the Pacific continues offshore where a narrow continental shelf drops to the continental slope in only a few miles. The ocean reaches a depth of more than 12,000 feet (3,700 m) just 50 mi (80 km) offshore. Two deep submarine canyons cut into the shelf near the Big Sur coast: the Sur Submarine Canyon, reaching a depth of 3,000 ft (910 m) just 8 mi (13 km) south of Point Sur, and Partington Submarine Canyon, which reaches a similar depth 6.8 mi (10.9 km) offshore of Grimes Canyon.

Like underwater parks, these marine protected areas help conserve ocean wildlife and marine ecosystems.

- Monterey Bay National Marine Sanctuary
- Point Lobos State Marine Reserve
- Point Sur State Marine Reserve and Marine Conservation Area
- Big Creek State Marine Reserve and Marine Conservation Area
- Salmon Creek State Area of Special Biological Significance
- California Sea Otter Game Refuge
- Julia Pfeiffer Burns Underwater Park

== Demographics ==
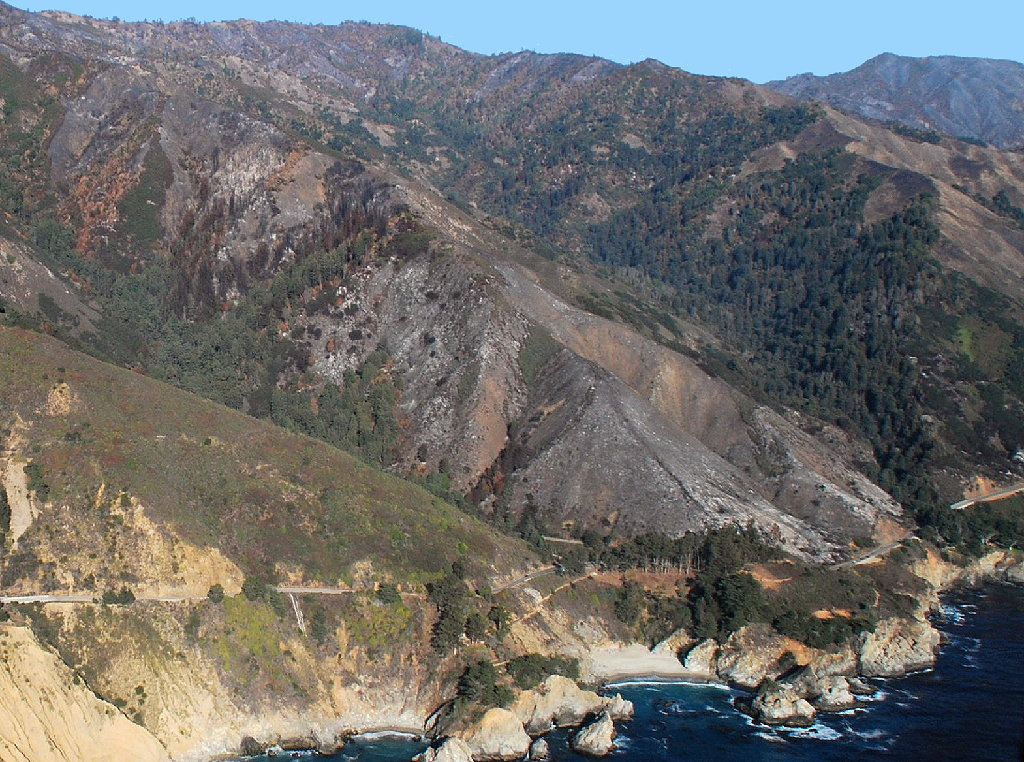
Julia Pfeiffer Burns State Park after fire

Big Sur is sparsely populated. There are about 1,800 to 2,000 year-round residents, only a few hundred more residents than found there in 1900. Big Sur residents include descendants of the original ranching families, artists, writers, service staff, along with homeowners. The mountainous terrain, restrictions imposed by the Big Sur Coastal Use Plan, limited availability of property that can be developed, and the expense required to build on available land has kept Big Sur relatively undeveloped. According to the Big Sur Chamber of Commerce, about half the businesses derive their income from the hospitality industry, and they in turn produce about 90 percent of the local economy.

=== Population data ===
The United States does not define a census-designated place called Big Sur, but it does define a census tract (115) that includes almost all of the Big Sur coast, beginning in the north at Malpaso Creek and ending south of Lucia. It does not include New Camoldi Hermitage, Gorda, and Ragged Point where a few dozen people live, and it does not include the isolated private inholdings within the Los Padres National Forest. It includes much of the interior coast as far west as the Tassajara Zen Center.

In 1977, there were 1,813 residents and 846 dwelling units. In 2018, the Census Bureau estimated there were 1,728 residents, (1,125 white, 525 Latino or Hispanic), 892 housing units, 639 households, 253 vacant or rental housing units; the median value of owner-occupied housing units was $877,100. Per capita income was $34,845; median income $63,843; mean income $81,766.

The racial makeup of this area was 87.6% White, 1.1% African American, 1.3% Native American, 2.4% Asian, 0.0% Pacific Islander, 5.5% from other races, and 3.0% from two or more races. Hispanic or Latino of any race was 9.6% of the population. In the 93920 ZCTA, the population age was widely distributed, with 20.2% under the age of 20, 4.5% from 20 to 24, 26.9% from 25 to 44, 37.0% from 45 to 64, and 11.2% who were 65 years of age or older. The median age was 43.2 years. The median income in 2000 for a household in 93920 ZCTA was $41,304, and the median income for a family was $65,083.

== Fire protection ==
Two local volunteer fire departments provide emergency services in the region. CalFire's nearest station is located in Carmel 33 miles (53 km) north of Big Sur Village. The United States Forest Service's Nacimiento Ranger Station is located on Nacimiento-Fergusson Road 7 miles (11 km) from the coast highway. It was destroyed by the arson-set Dolan Fire on September 8, 2020, and is to be rebuilt.

During winter storms following the 2020 Dolan Fire, entire sections of the Nacimiento-Fergusson Road were washed away, and it has remained closed since then. In January 2022, U.S. Representative Jimmy Panetta announced that he had obtained $126 million in Federal Highway Administration funds to repair the road and rebuild the USFS Nacimiento Ranger Station destroyed in the blaze. This includes replacing the fire station, barracks, engine garage and pumphouse, along with some site utilities, such as a water well, solar connections and access roads.

Due to the remoteness of the region, it may take first responders more than one hour to respond to an emergency event. Following initial response and depending on the location, the nearest hospital is up to an hour away. In critical cases, patients can be flown out by air ambulance depending on their injuries and weather conditions.

The volunteer Mid Coast Fire Brigade located on Palo Colorado Road was organized in June, 1979. Residents raised $300,000 to build a firehouse. Members receive training in CPR, defibrillation, rope rescue, vehicle extrication, water rescue as well as structural, vehicle and wildland firefighting skills. As of 2004, there were about 300 households in the Palo Colorado Canyon area.

The volunteer Big Sur Fire Brigade was founded by Gary Koeppel on August 1, 1974. He persuaded Walter Trotter, a member of a pioneer Big Sur family, to become the first fire chief. Trotter was enormously well-known and influential, and he very quickly appointed a number of volunteers. The brigade provides emergency response from mile marker 58.3 north of the Little Sur River bridge on Highway 1 to the San Luis Obispo County Line. The department has two stations. Station 1 is located south of Pfeiffer Big Sur State Park at the Post Ranch. Station 2 is located near Gorda.

== Education ==
Two schools are available to students in Big Sur. To the north, the Captain Cooper School serves 52 students from grades K-5 who live in the vicinity of Palo Colorado Canyon, Big Sur Village, Posts, and Slates Hot Springs. The land for the school was donated in 1962 by Frances Molera. She stipulated that it be named after her pioneer grandfather, Juan B. R. Cooper, who bought Rancho El Sur in 1840. The school was built by community members without assistance from the Carmel Unified School District, who assumed management of the school once it was complete. Older students take a bus to Carmel schools.

To the south, the Pacific Valley School was founded by the Plaskett family in 1880. It serves 22 students in grades K–12 in the areas near Plaskett, Lucia, and Gorda. Closed repeatedly due to low or no enrollment, it reopened in the 1950s. Pacific Valley School is one of two schools in the Big Sur Unified School District. It has a 3:1 student/teacher ratio. They engage in collaborative learning between age groups.

== Government ==
At the county level, Big Sur is represented on the Monterey County Board of Supervisors by Mary Adams. In the California State Assembly, Big Sur is in the 17th senatorial district, represented by Democrat John Laird, and in the 30th Assembly district, represented by Democrat Dawn Addis. In the United States House of Representatives, Big Sur is in California's 19th congressional district, represented by Democrat Jimmy Panetta.

== In popular culture ==
=== In literature ===
In 1964, Ballantine Books published Dark Dominion, a science-fiction novel by David Duncan describing a Magellan Project to build a spaceship called the Black Planet. Construction is located at Big Sur. The narrator and others take various trips around the region and the novel describes the area in some detail, including caves.

In 1962, famous Beat author Jack Kerouac released the novel Big Sur, which prominently features the location throughout the narrative. It became one of Kerouac's most prolific works.

In 1995, prominent environmentalist David Brower published Not Man Apart: Photographs of the Big Sur Coast, featuring Robinson Jeffers' poetry and photography of the Big Sur coast. In the posthumously published 2002 book Stones of the Sur, Carmel landscape photographer Morley Baer combined his classical black-and-white photographs of Big Sur with some of Jeffers's poetry.

=== In film ===
A number of well-known films are set in Big Sur, including The Sandpiper (1965), starring Elizabeth Taylor, Richard Burton, Eva Marie Saint and Charles Bronson. The 1974 film Zandy's Bride, starring Gene Hackman and Liv Ullmann, was also based in the region. In 2013, Jack Kerouac's novel Big Sur was adapted into a film of the same name, starring Kate Bosworth and directed by the actress' husband, Michael Polish. As of 2017, 19 movies had been filmed in the Big Sur region, beginning with Suspicion in 1941.

=== In music ===
"California Saga: California" and "California Saga: Big Sur"(1973), songs on The Beach Boys' album Holland, depicts the rugged wilderness in the area and the culture of its inhabitants.

"Going Back to Big Sur" was written by Johnny Rivers, who sang it on his 1968 album Realization. The closing stanzas: "Guess I'll drive up Highway One / Did the ocean kiss the setting sun? / The stars dancing in the sky / Sort of puts you on a natural high Going back to Big Sur / This time, I might just stay /I'm going back and straighten out my head /Just south of Monterey / And that girl."

The song "Big Sur Moon" from Buckethead's album Colma is named after the area.

The song "Bixby Canyon Bridge" from Death Cab for Cutie's album Narrow Stairs explores the narrator's visit to Big Sur, waiting for an epiphany that never comes.

Jazz saxophonist Charles Lloyd has released albums entitled Notes from Big Sur (1992) and Big Sur Tapestry (1979).

The Dharma at Big Sur, by John Adams, for electric violin and orchestra, was composed in 2003 for the opening of Disney Hall in Los Angeles.

Alanis Morissette released the song Big Sur as her "ode to Big Sur with all its majesty" as exclusive bonus track on the Target edition of her 2012 Havoc and Bright Lights album. The song was released as single in 2014.

Big Sur is the third single released by Irish band the Thrills, taken from their debut album, So Much for the City (2003).

Road Trippin', from the Red Hot Chili Peppers' 1999 album Californication, evokes the experience of a road trip through Big Sur.

The Big Sur Folk Festival was held annually in the region from 1964 to 1971. A documentary film of the 1969 concert was produced titled Celebration at Big Sur.

=== In computing ===
Apple's desktop operating system, macOS Big Sur, announced on June 22, 2020, during WWDC, is named after this region.

== See also ==
- Big Sur Land Trust
- Big Sur River
- Bixby Bridge
- McWay Falls
- Monterey County
- Pacific Coast Highway
- Yosemite National Park
