= Salinian Block =

Terrane west of the main trace of the San Andreas Fault system in California

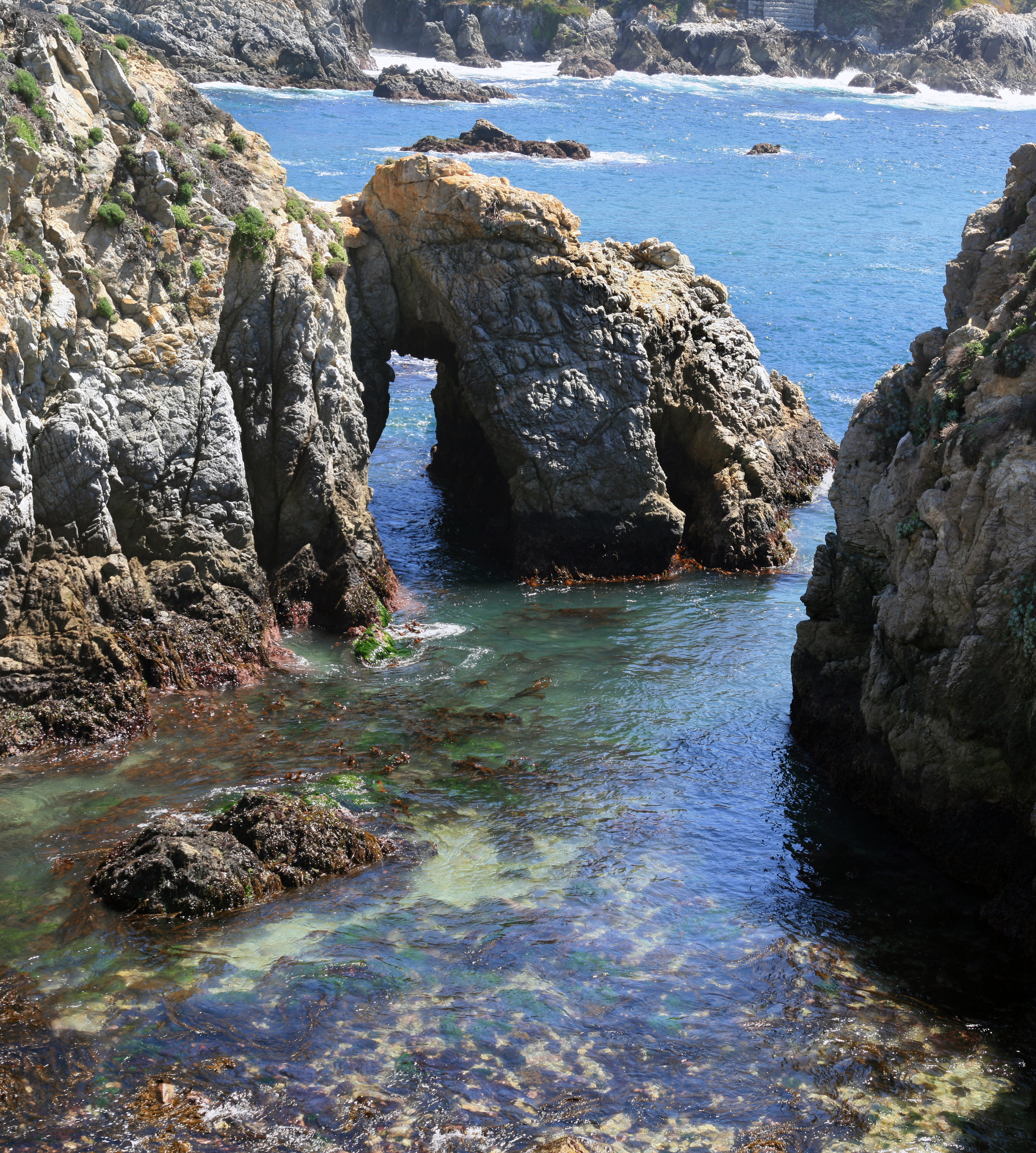
Salinian Block granite at Point Lobos

The Salinian Block or Salinian terrane is a geologic terrane which lies west of the main trace of the San Andreas Fault system in California. It is bounded on the south by the Big Pine Fault in Ventura County and on the west by the Nacimiento Fault. It was named for the Salinas Valley in Monterey County, California.

== Geology ==
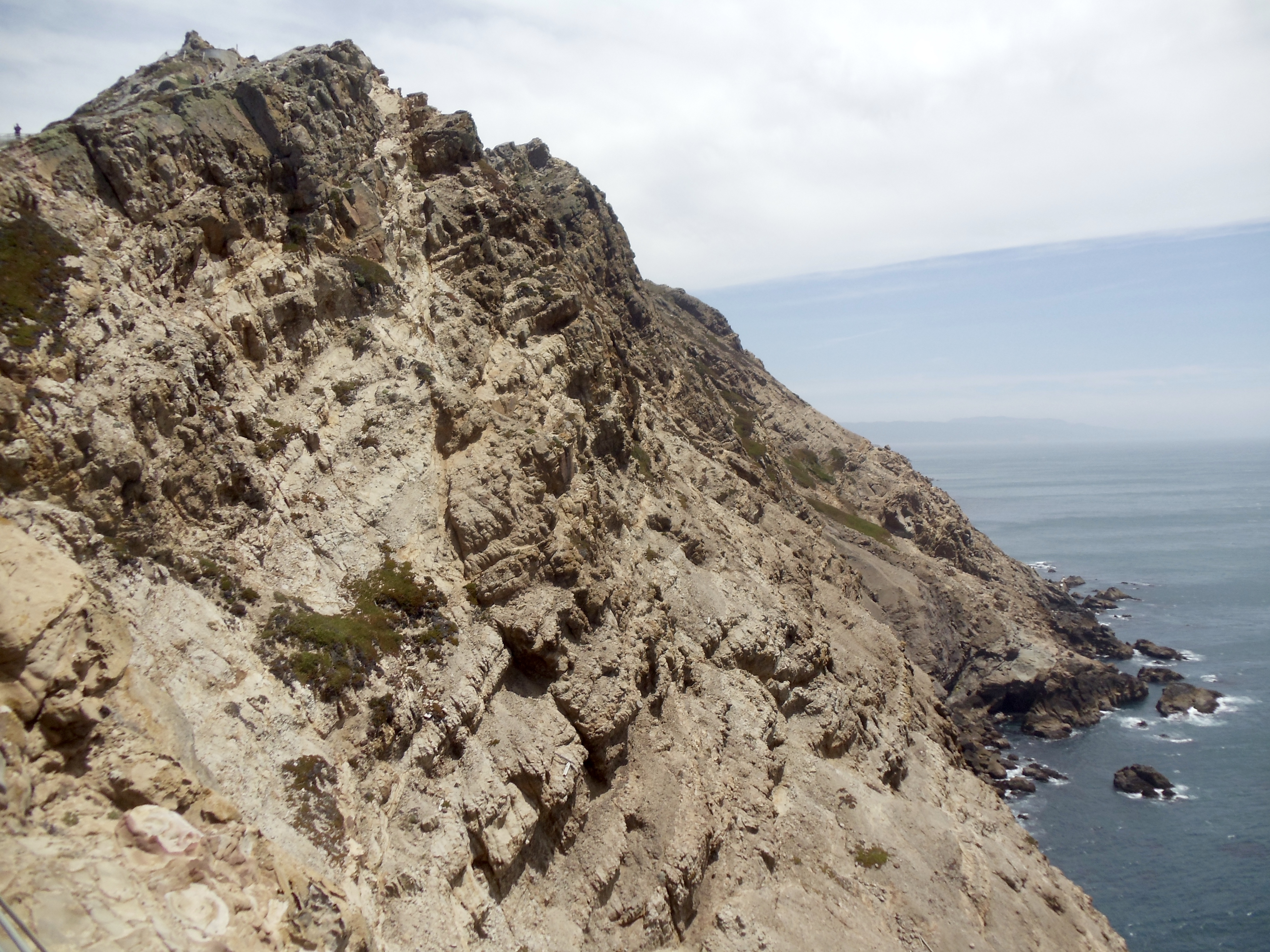
The prominent, upward-sloping Salinian Block formation can be seen here from the Point Reyes Lighthouse.

The Salinian Block is largely granitic, in accordance with its continental crustal origin. This composition contrasts sharply, and paradoxically, with much of the crust to its east, which is sedimentary and oceanic in origin. The block's granitic core, fragments of the batholith of the Peninsular Ranges, shares its origins with the Sierra Nevada mountains far to the east.

During the past 30 million years the North American Plate has been overriding the East Pacific Rise and transform faulting along the developing San Andreas fault zone. Successive "stretched out" slivers of the Sierra Nevada - the Peninsular Batholith - have been moving to the northwest to their current location, which movement continues. The granitic plutons of the Salinas block stretch from Bodega Head (38°18′39.6″N 123°03′57.6″W) in the north to Mount Pinos (34°48′46.1″N 119°08′43.4″W) at the southern end of the block.

In the years since the 1974 study by Johnson and Normark the connection with the southern Sierra Nevada has been questioned, stating that "it more nearly resembles granite in the Mojave Desert".

== Notable Features ==
Some of the more notable portions of the block are visible as:

- Bodega Head – Promontory in California, United States
- Point Reyes – Cape in Northern California
- The Farallon Islands – Group of islands off the coast of California, United States
- Devil's Slide – Promontory in San Mateo County, California
- Monterey Peninsula – Peninsula in California, USA
- Pebble Beach – Unincorporated community in California, United States
- Point Lobos – Cape in California, USA
- McWay Falls – Tidefall in Julia Pfeiffer Burns State Park, California, United States
- Anderson Canyon
- Pinnacles National Park – National park in California, United States
- Mount Pinos – Mountain of the Transverse Ranges in California, United States

Much of the mountainous terrain along the Salinian Block is protected under the US Forest Service and U.S. Fish and Wildlife Service, most notably within Los Padres National Forest, Julia Pfeiffer Burns State Park, and Point Reyes National Seashore.
