= Anderson Canyon =

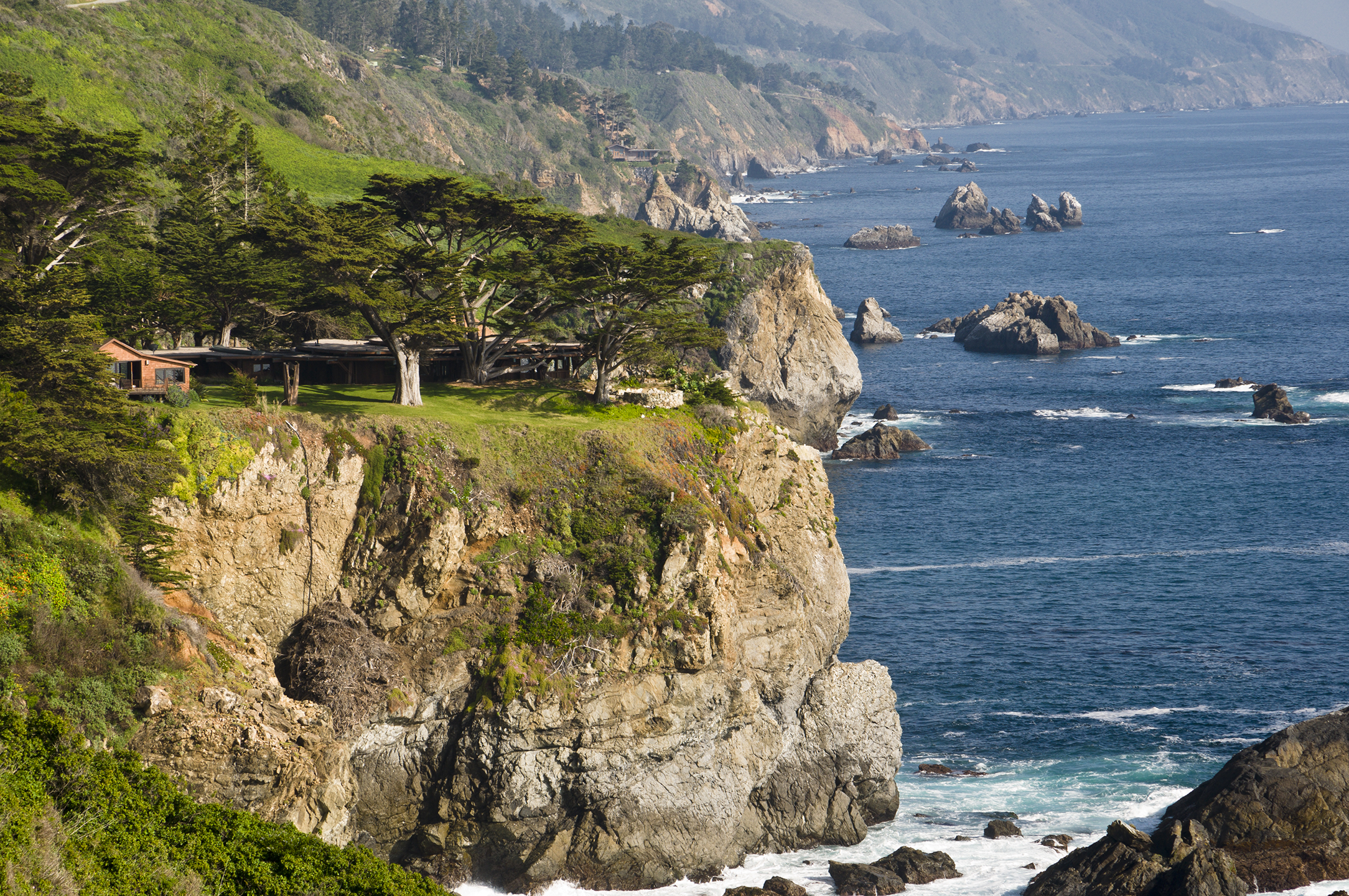
- Staude House in 2010 on bluff at mouth of Anderson Canyon

- Location in California
- Country: United States
- State: California
- County: Monterey County
- Elevation: 476 ft (145 m)
- ZIP code: 93920
- Area code: 805
- GNIS feature ID: 1659696

Anderson Canyon in the Big Sur region of California was named after pioneering homesteaders James and Peter Andersen who were the first European settlers of the area. The canyon, Anderson Creek, and Anderson Peak (4,099 feet (1,249 m)) are south of McWay Falls and within the boundaries of Julia Pfeiffer Burns State Park.

During the construction of Highway One in the 1920s and the 1930s, it was the location of a convict work camp. After the camp closed, literary bohemians like Henry Miller rented the shacks, forming what Miller later called the "Anderson Creek Gang".

The canyon is within the boundaries of the Monterey Bay National Marine Sanctuary, Sea Otter Refuge, and California condor reintroduction area. The Staude House built in the 1960s sits on a bluff at the mouth of Anderson Canyon 120 feet (37 m) above sea level. A 90 acres (36 ha) parcel on the bluff between the coastal cliff and Highway 1 sold for $31,394,000 in 2010, one of the largest sale prices for residential real estate in Monterey County history.

== Early history ==
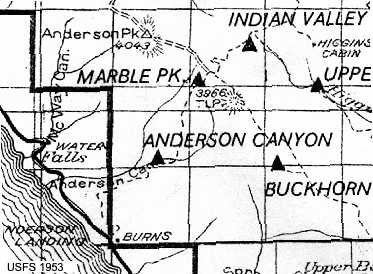
Anderson Trail

Pino Palado Peak, the name given the peak during the Mexican era, is said to refer to a tall Ponderosa pine, “peeled” of its bark by a lightning strike, that at one time grew on the southeastern summit. The creek was named after the peak. The modern name is a corruption of the surname of settlers James Andersen, who emigrated from Denmark in 1874 and homesteaded in the canyon, and his brother Peter, who arrived in 1883. The Andersen family had business ties to many of the early settlers in the region, including the Pfeiffers, Slates, and Danis.

In the late 19th century a trail was constructed that connected the coast ridge with the coast at Burns Creek, just south of Anderson Landing.

=== Saddle Rock landing ===
Before construction of Highway One, local residents harvested redwood and tanbark, and mined limestone and gold. These resources were shipped out of dog-hole ports located in the region including Saddle Rock Landing at the mouth of Anderson Creek. It was named due to its proximity (.4 miles) to Saddle Rock, a prominent sea shore feature of present-day Julia Pfeiffer Burns State Park.

The Anderson Canyon region was homesteaded by Aaron Harlan in the 1880s, located about a mile up the canyon from the mouth of the creek. "Pop" Ernest Doelter, a Monterey, CA restaurateur who created the abalone steak owned the Saddle Rock Landing for abalone harvesting. Pop's restaurant was a favorite of George Sterling, Jack London, and Andrew Molera.

== Highway construction ==
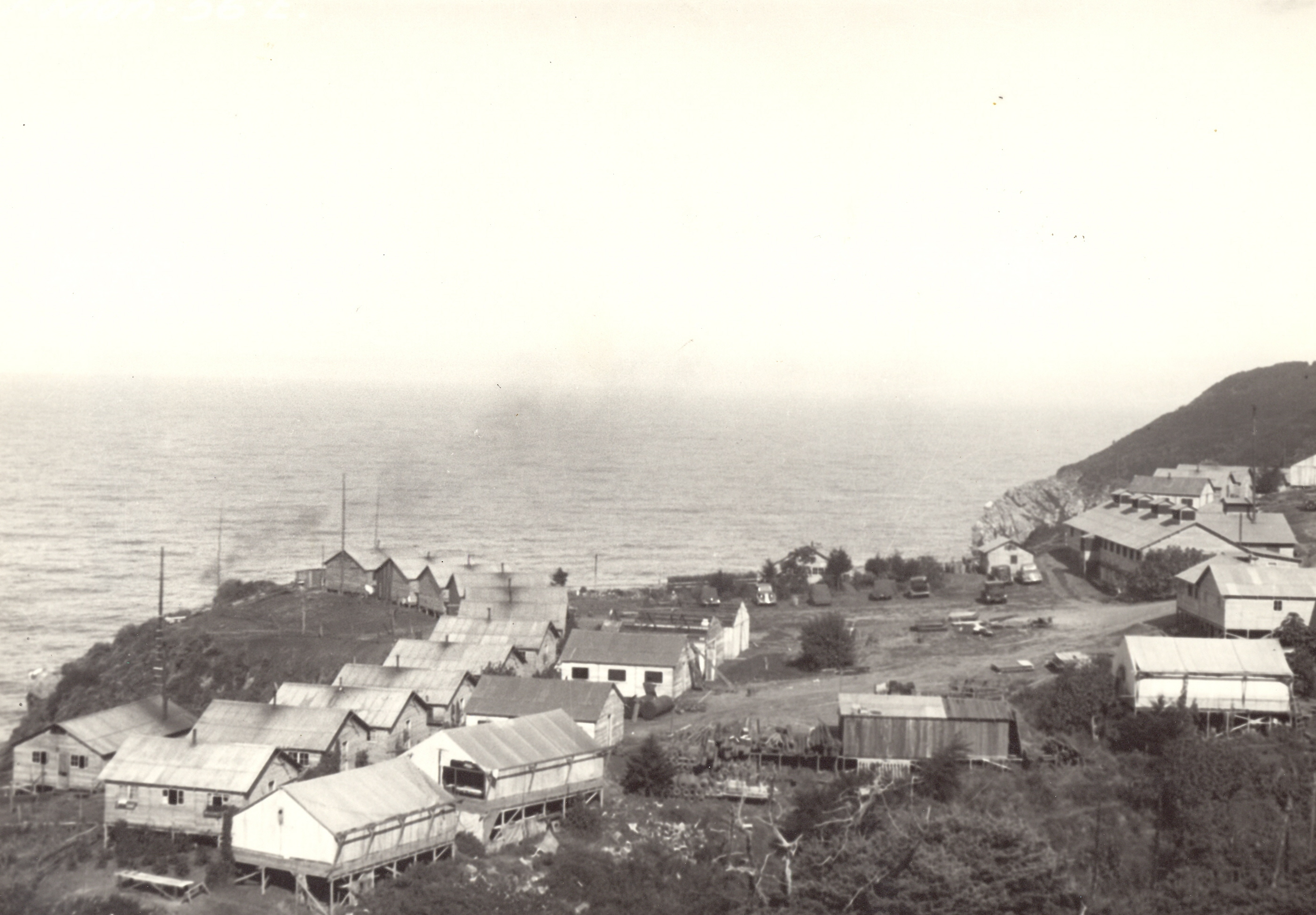
Anderson Canyon Labor Camp

The 10 miles (16 km) section of Highway One between Anderson Canyon and Big Sur was completed in October, 1924. In 1926, construction was halted due to lack of funds. Anderson Canyon was the southern terminus of the road. Construction of the southern portion resumed in 1928, and in 1932, Anderson canyon was selected as the site of the largest prison labor camp on the coast. From the Anderson Canyon camp, the highway was built south to connect with the road at Big Creek. Anderson Canyon was the last labor camp built. The entire highway was completed and opened on June 17, 1937.

== Bohemians ==
After the Highway was complete, many buildings were left standing on the site from its use as a convict camp. During the 1940 and early 1950s, these cabins were rented out to early Bohemians. Henry Miller lived in a shack in Anderson Canyon from 1944 to 1947. Miller wrote "Into the Nightlife" while living there, and he described his fellow artists as the "Anderson Creek Gang" in Big Sur and the Oranges of Hieronymus Bosch. Miller paid $5 per month rent for his shack on the property.

Other residents included avant-garde musician Harry Partch, Emil White, and collage artist and painter Jean Varda. Author Elizabeth Smart also lived at Anderson Canyon. Her novella, By Grand Central Station I Sat Down and Wept (1945) may be the first fiction regarding Big Sur's bohemian residents.

== Staude House ==
In 1965, Tony Staude, former chairman of pharmaceutical wholesaler Bergen Brunswig, and his wife, sculptor Marguerite Brunswig, bought property in Anderson Canyon. They found abandoned cars and remnants of the convict labor camp, including the former infirmary. In 1969, they used reclaimed redwood timbers that had formerly been used as falsework in the construction of a coastal bridge to build a 2,234 square feet (207.5 m^{2}) two bedroom and two bath circular home on the tip of the bluff overlooking the sea. In 2016, new owners learned from a survey that the caretaker unit on Parcel A extended 13.5 feet (4.1 m) over the property line into Julia Pfeiffer Burns State Park, which surrounds the property.. They were granted a permit from Monterey County to demolish the building. They also removed an accessory unit visible from Highway 1, which as a result of the passage of the Big Sur Land Use plan, was a violating use. They built a new 8,396 square feet (780.0 m^{2}) residence and a new accessory building east of Highway 1, all outside the critical view shed in which new buildings are prohibited.

== Ecology and biology ==
Anderson Peak is the site of a California condor release site owned by the Ventana Wildlife Society at 2,770 feet (840 m). In 2006, two condors were discovered nesting in a hollowed out, partially burned redwood tree. These were the first natural birth of a condor in California since 1905.

In 2011, PG&E began a $4.2 million project to bury power lines running from Highway One up Anderson Canyon to Anderson Peak in order to protect condors from potential electrocution. The project involved around 3 miles (4.8 km) of overhead power lines, built in the 1950s, to be removed and installation of an underground replacement line traveling 4,000 feet high.

Anderson Canyon is an upland redwood forest. Characteristic species include coastal redwood, California bay, tanbark oak, big-leaf maple, and western sword fern. Wildlife species that may occur in this community include ensatina, Pacific slender salamander, Pacific giant salamander, western-screech owl, Allen's hummingbird, purple martin, acorn woodpecker, Steller's jay, Townsend's western big-eared bat, and pallid bat.

== Film credits ==
Anderson Canyon appears in many films and photoshoots including National Geographic's Big Sur: Wild California, the Richard Burton and Liz Taylor classic The Sandpiper, and more recently in a feature film based on Jack Kerouac's Big Sur. Anderson Canyon also stands in for the Esalen Institute setting in the series finale of the television show Mad Men.

== See also ==
- List of rivers in California
- Carmel Bay State Marine Conservation Area
- Big Sur River
- Little Sur River
- Geography of California
- Notleys Landing, California
