= Frederick C. Hicks =

American politician (1872–1925)

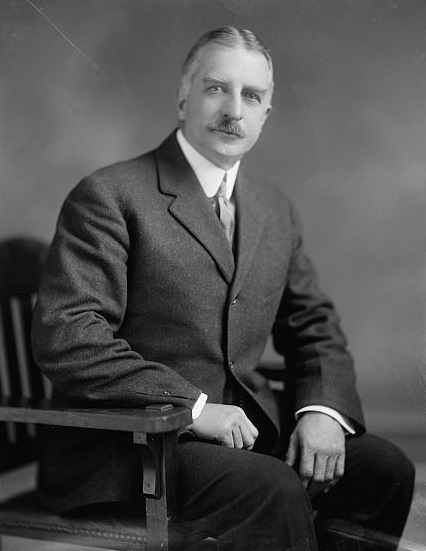
- Hicks in 1915

Member of the U.S. House of Representatives from New York's 1st district
- In office January 4, 1916 – March 3, 1923
- Preceded by: Lathrop Brown
- Succeeded by: Robert L. Bacon

Personal details
- Born: March 6, 1872 Westbury, New York
- Died: December 14, 1925 (aged 53) Washington, D.C.
- Party: Republican

Frederick Charles Hicks (originally Frederick Hicks Cocks; March 6, 1872 – December 14, 1925) was an American banker and politician who served as a United States representative from New York from 1916 to 1923.

== Biography ==
He was born in Westbury, New York, on March 6, 1872. He attended the public schools, Swarthmore College, and Harvard University. He engaged in the banking business. Frederick C. Hicks' brother, William Willets Cocks, was also a U.S. Representative from New York.

In 1901, he published Lectures on the Theory of Economics.

=== Congress ===
He was an unsuccessful candidate for election in 1912 to the Sixty-third Congress. He was elected as a Republican to the Sixty-fourth and to the three succeeding Congresses, holding office from January 4, 1916, to March 3, 1923. His 1914 election was one of the closest in history. He was originally declared the winner by 15 votes, but subsequent lawsuits narrowed the lead to 4 votes and then 10. The lawsuits took more than a year and Hicks wasn't certified the winner until December 21. He was sworn in when Congress reconvened in January 1916, making this one of the longest elections in the history of the House. Though his opponent Lathrop Brown contested the argument, arguing that some precinct captains were drunk and careless, he lost and Hicks retained his seat.

Rep. Hicks was a supporter of women's suffrage. He had been at the bedside of his dying wife prior to the final vote on the Nineteenth Amendment in 1918, but left at her urging to take part in the vote. He provided the final, crucial vote, and then returned home for her funeral.

He was not a candidate for renomination in 1922 and declined a diplomatic position to Uruguay tendered by President Warren Harding.

== Later career ==
Hicks was eastern director of the Republican National Committee campaign in 1924, and was appointed by President Calvin Coolidge as a member of the commission to represent the United States at the celebration of the Centennial of the Battle of Aracucho, held at Lima, Peru, during December 1924.

He was appointed Alien Property Custodian on April 10, 1925, and served until his death in Washington, D.C., in 1925. Interment was in Quaker Cemetery, Westbury, Long Island.

== Death ==
He died on December 14, 1925.

U.S. House of Representatives
Preceded by Vacant	Member of the U.S. House of Representatives from New York's 1st congressional district 1916-1923	Succeeded by Robert L. Bacon
