= McWay Creek =

McWay Creek McWay Canyon
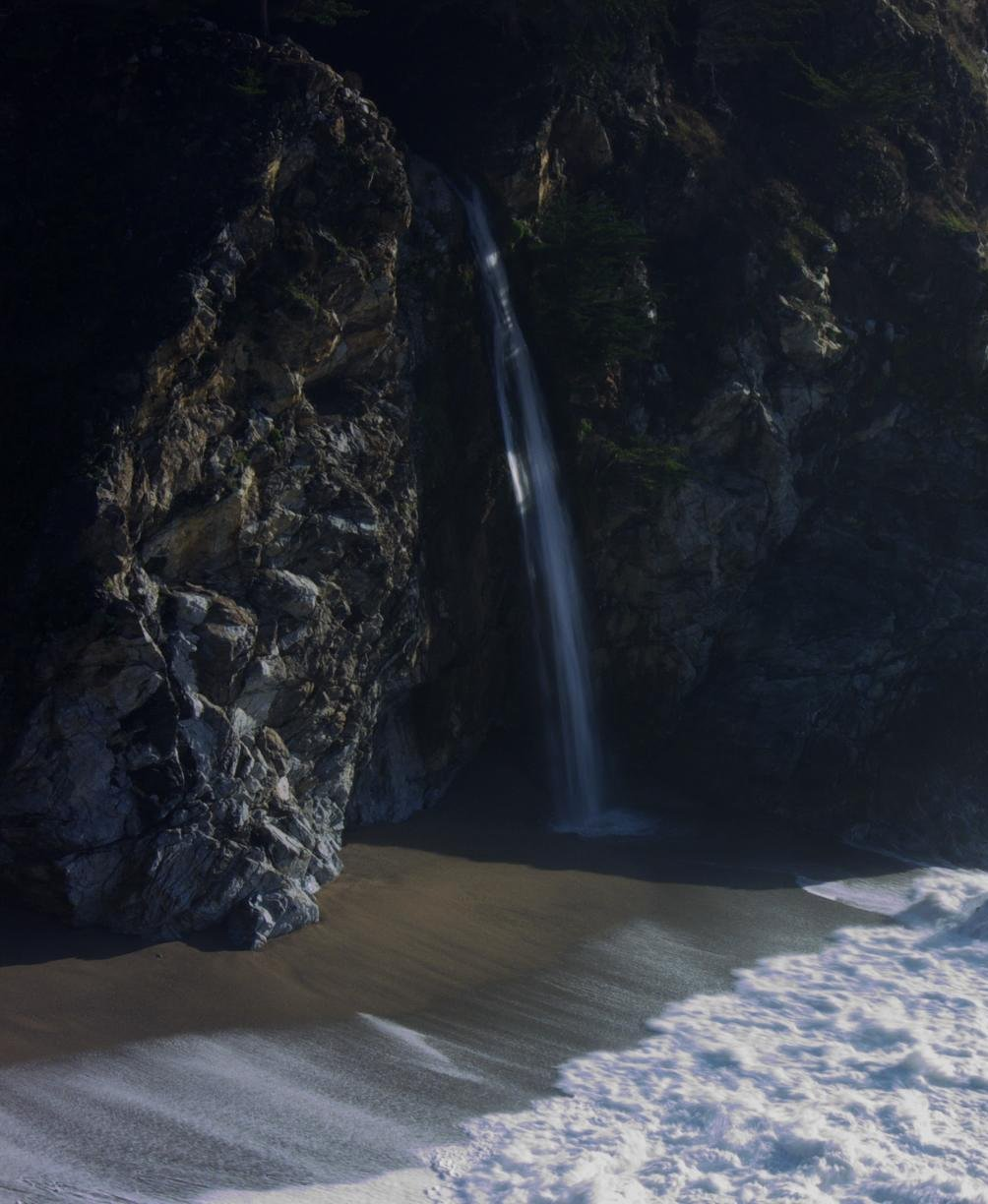
- In McWay Canyon

- Location of the mouth of McWay Creek in California

Location
- Country: United States
- State: California
- Region: Julia Pfeiffer Burns State Park

Physical characteristics
- Source
  - location: Coast Range, Partington Ridge, California
  - coordinates: 36°11′13″N 121°39′15″W
  - elevation: 3,000 ft (910 m)
- Mouth: Pacific Ocean
  - location: Waterfall Cove, California
  - coordinates: 36°09′30″N 121°40′19″W
  - elevation: 100 ft (30 m)

Basin features
- Tributaries
  - left: Middle Fork McWay Creek, South Fork McWay Creek
  - right: North Fork McWay Creek

McWay Creek is a 2.5-mile-long (4.0 km) coastal stream in Monterey County in the U.S. state of California. It flows steeply west and south from McWay Canyon, high in California's Central Coast Range, and spills into the Pacific Ocean at Waterfall Cove after flowing over scenic McWay Falls. Most of the creek and its watershed are contained within Julia Pfeiffer Burns State Park, 12 miles (19 km) south of Pfeiffer Big Sur State Park. The creek is named after Christopher McWay from New York, a pioneer who homesteaded the property.

A Pelton wheel was installed in McWay Creek and generated power for Saddle Rock Ranch, the only electricity in the area for many years. The creek and its canyon are rich in vegetation types, due to the humid coastal climate with frequent fog and rainfall.

== Geography ==
McWay Creek is formed by the confluence of its North and Middle Forks, at an elevation of roughly 1,270 feet (390 m). The North Fork is the longer of the two streams, beginning at an elevation of 3,450 feet (1,050 m), and running in a straight course southward to where it joins the Middle Fork. The smaller Middle Fork begins at an elevation of 3,182 feet (970 m) and flows south-southwest to meet the North Fork and form the mainstem of McWay Creek. After the mainstem is formed, the creek winds south and west through a narrow canyon to where it meets the South Fork at an elevation of roughly 400 feet (120 m).

The South Fork, the largest sub-basin in the McWay Creek watershed, begins at an elevation of 2,559 feet (780 m) on the east side of a ridge that separates it from the mainstem. After flowing south and turning slightly in a south-southwest direction, it meets McWay Creek. The creek then heads southwest, passing a parking area for Julia Pfeiffer Burns State Park and crossing under California's Highway 1 via a concrete culvert. It spills into the Pacific Ocean at Waterfall Cove.

There are a number of waterfalls in the basin of McWay Creek. The most well-known is McWay Falls, which spills 80 feet (24 m) onto a sandy beach at Waterfall Cove. A smaller waterfall, the two-tier, 30-foot (9.1 m) McWay Creek Falls is located upstream of the Highway 1 culvert and the parking area. A small 30-foot (9.1 m) cascade, Canyon Trail Falls, is fed by the South Fork just before it meets McWay Creek. As most of the creek is steep and rocky, there are many unnamed waterfalls that also exist. McWay Creek is fed by a number of springs in McWay Canyon and flows year round.

== History ==
Christopher McWay homesteaded the canyon named after him in the late 1870s. In 1924, Lathrop and Hélène Hooper Brown purchased the Saddle Rock Ranch totalling 1,600 acres from McWay, and Julia Pfieffer Burns, another Big Sur pioneer, leased land for cattle operations. Hélène became a good friend of Julia until Julia died in 1928. The Browns had a Pelton wheel installed in McWay Creek to generate electricity for the ranch.

== Biology ==
The humid coastal climate of Big Sur and the McWay Canyon area supports a wide variety of vegetation in McWay Canyon. By the coast, the most prominent riparian vegetation consists of willows, alders, western coltsfoot and elk clover, with other species also existing among the dominant plants. Redwood trees also exist in McWay Canyon, but due to salty ocean air, it is said that the ones closer to the shore have not survived healthily. Coastal sage scrub is the dominant ground cover, specked by monkey flowers, Indian paintbrush, common yarrow, blue blossom and coast morning glory.

Upstream, oaks and bay trees begin to take presence. Ground cover consists of mostly sword fern, gooseberry, western wake robin and redwood sorrel. Forest clearings, found near higher elevations, consist of hedge nettle, bracken fern, and wild iris. Redwoods are still prevalent in the upstream areas of the watershed with one rumored to be the largest in the Big Sur area. As elevations increase, live oak, chamise and Coulter pine begin to make presence.

== Wildlife ==
Originating in the Santa Lucia Range, McWay Creek makes its journey across Julia Pfeiffer Burns State Park, reaching the Pacific Ocean through the McWay Falls. Due to the fact that the creek traverses through a terrain full of mountains to an environment near the coast, it makes it a great habitat for marine, terrestrial, and riparian fauna. The coastal humidity and the frequent rainfall support ecological diversity. Most of the interactions occur near the McWay Falls, where marine and terrestrial species intersect.

The canyon surrounding the creek is home to a variety of wildlife, both in the air and on land. One group of birds that can be seen are raptors, specifically the California condor. The California condor is an endangered species that has been reintroduced in the Big Sur. Along with the condor, other endangered birds like the bald eagle, California brown pelicans, and peregrine falcons also live among McWay Canyon. There are other birds that live along the coast, such as the double-crested cormorant and four seabird colonies. These colonies are among the largest found in Big Sur. On land, although rare to see, there are mammals like mountain lions, bobcats, racoons, and skunks. On the smaller end, there are mammals like the ring-tailed cat. The ring-tailed cat benefits from riparian zones alongside the creek to survive and obtain food such as juniper berries, wild figs, and persimmons. Ring-tailed cats can also eat small organisms like birds, lizards, snakes and frogs. Other organisms that benefit from the food and shelter of the riparian zones include amphibians and reptiles. Apart from the mammals, birds, amphibians and reptiles, the creek and the state park in general are home to one of the 18 remaining colonies of the Smith's blue butterflies. This species of butterfly is very sensitive because it requires coastal environments and depends on a rare plant to host its eggs. The park also hosts the Monarch butterfly during its winter migration season.

Moving from up the mountains, down to the waterfall, and into the ocean, where freshwater and marine habitats stand out. Along by the kelp forests, you can often spot the California sea otter. These otters feast on abalone, which are large marine snails. This species of otters has made a recovery since it was close to extinction and is now growing rapidly in numbers under the protection of the Endangered Species Act. Another common sight along the coast is the harbor seal and the California sea lion that reside on the rocky areas of the cove. There is another species of seal, the elephant seal, that is slightly rarer to see along the coast due to its seasonal presence. This species of seal also survived extinction and is now expanding from islands to more mainland areas. They tend to be along the coast from December through March, when their peak sightings take place. Submerging into the ocean, the kelp greenling, the cabezon, and many other colorful fish can be seen in areas where there is a large presence of kelp forests west of the creek. These forests are where they build their homes. At different times of the year, you can see a variety of whale species including the humpback whale, which is commonly seen during the summer; the gray whale, which is seen during the winter when on their migration to Mexico; and lastly the blue whale, which can be seen during early summer to mid-fall. These species of whales all pass by the similar general area of McWay Cove.

== See also ==
- List of rivers of California

== Works cited ==
- Shaffer, Chris; Bourgo, David; Shaffer, Nicole; Shangle, Joel (2003). The Definitive Guide to the Waterfalls of Southern and Central California. Shafdog Publishing. ISBN 0-9712814-2-4.
- Elliot, Analise (2005). Hiking & Backpacking Big Sur: A Complete Guide to the Trails of Big Sur, Ventana Wilderness, and Silver Peak Wilderness. Wilderness Press. ISBN 0-89997-326-4
- Henson, Paul; Usner, Donald J.; Kells, Valerie A (1996). The Natural History of Big Sur. University of California Press. ISBN 0-520-20510-3
