= Lathrop Brown =

American politician (1883–1959)

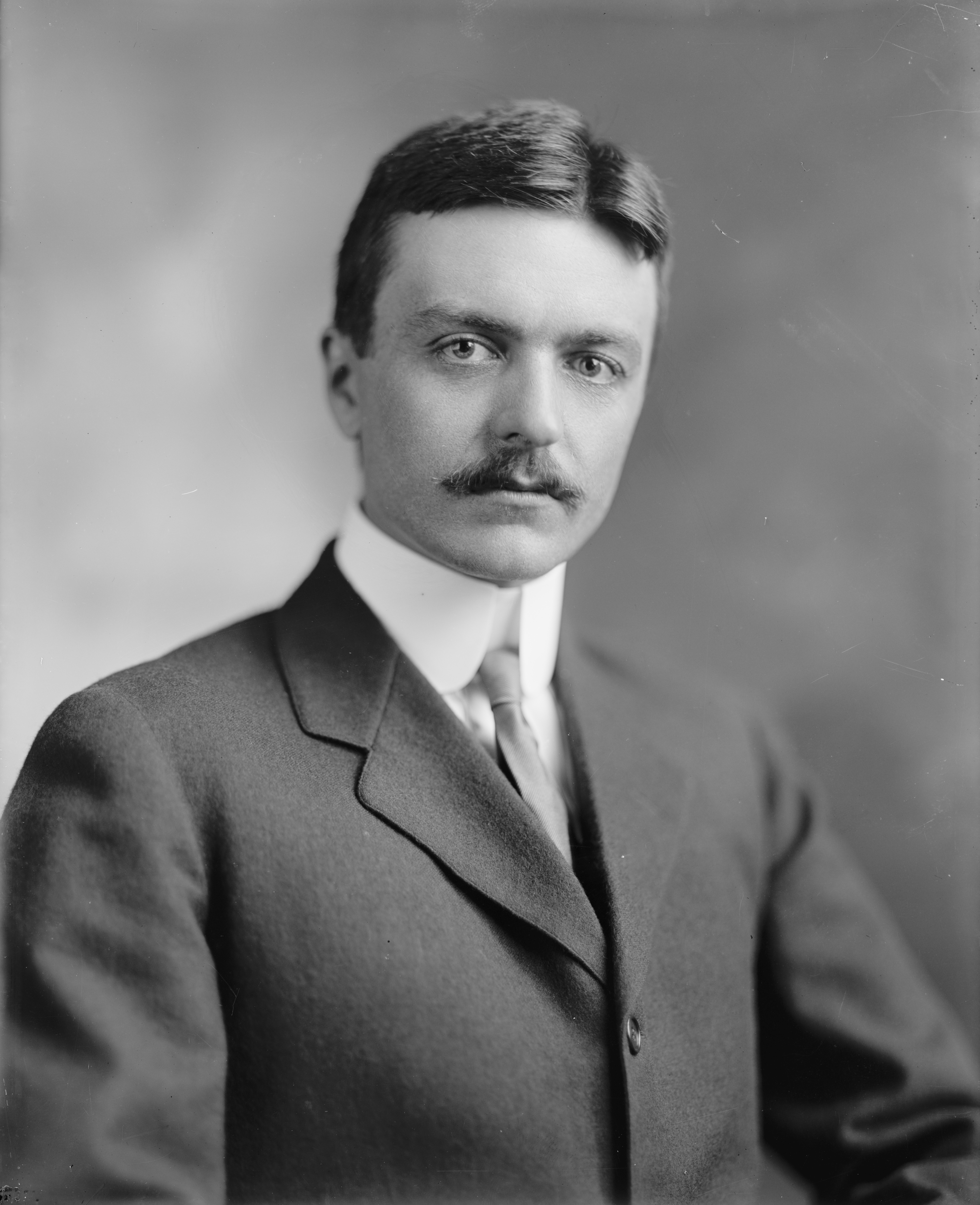
- Brown, 1905–1945

Member of the U.S. House of Representatives from New York's 1st district
- In office March 4, 1913 – March 3, 1915
- Preceded by: Martin W. Littleton
- Succeeded by: Frederick C. Hicks

Personal details
- Born: February 26, 1883 New York City, US
- Died: November 28, 1959 (aged 76) Fort Myers, Florida, US
- Resting place: Abbey of the Light, Manasota Memorial Park, Sarasota, Florida
- Party: Democratic
- Spouse: Hélène Hooper
- Children: 2
- Relatives: Archibald Brown (brother)
- Education: Harvard University
- Occupation: Real estate investor, politician

Military service
- Allegiance: United States
- Branch/service: United States Army
- Battles/wars: World War I

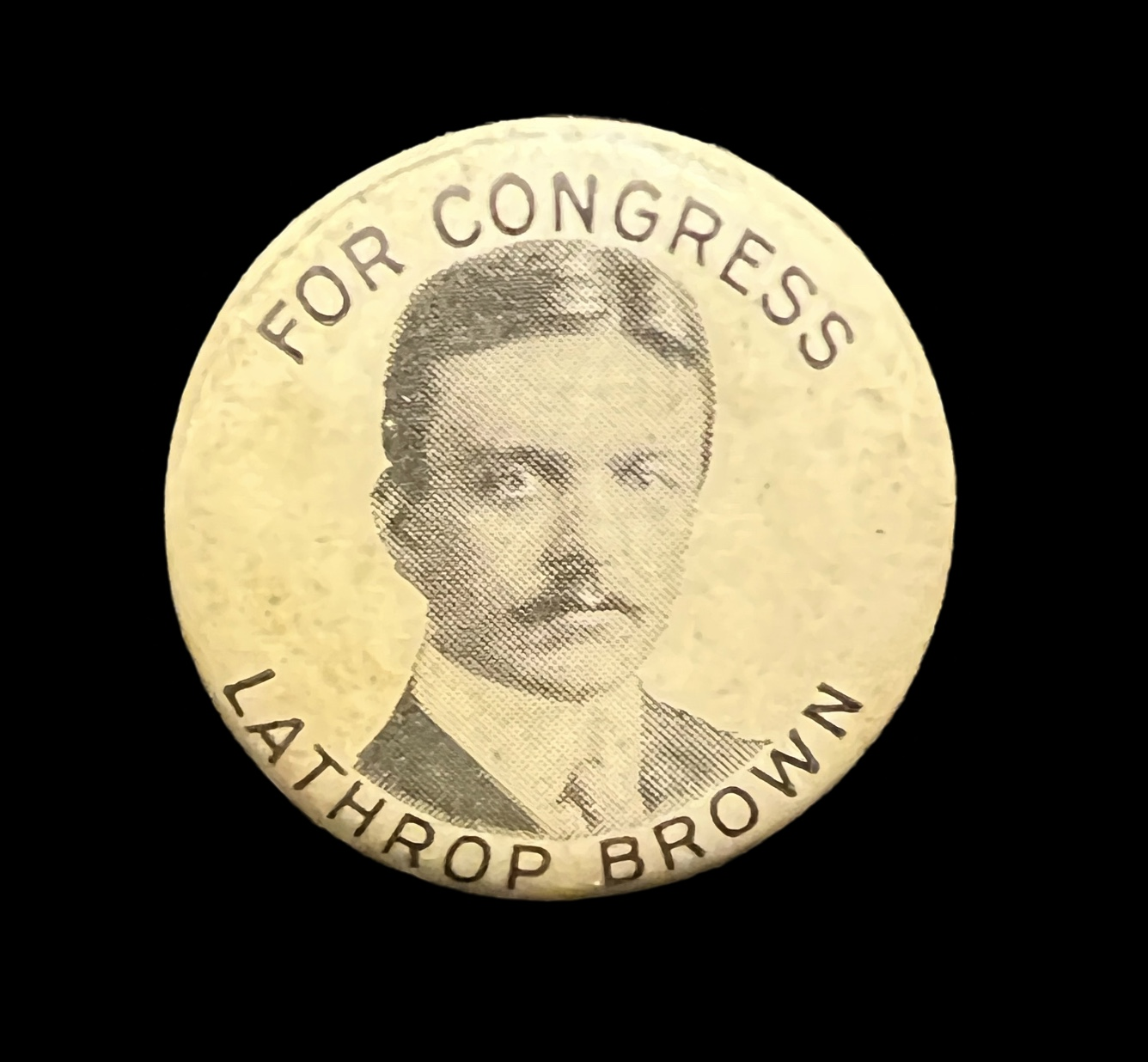
A circular pin-back campaign button featuring a halftone portrait of Lathrop Brown with the inscription “FOR CONGRESS – LATHROP BROWN” around the perimeter. Likely produced circa 1912 during his successful campaign for the U.S. House of Representatives from New York's 1st congressional district. The button is an example of early 20th-century political ephemera, using celluloid over tin with a metal pin back, a common construction for campaign materials of the era.

Lathrop Brown (February 26, 1883 – November 28, 1959) was a United States representative from New York.

== Early life and education ==
Brown was born on February 26, 1883, in New York City. His brother was architect Archibald Brown. He graduated from Groton School in 1900 and from Harvard University in 1903, where he was roommates with Franklin D. Roosevelt. He engaged in the real estate business and served in Squadron A of the National Guard of New York for five years. He was also keenly interested in eugenics.

== Government service ==
Brown was elected as a Democrat to the Sixty-third Congress (March 4, 1913 – March 3, 1915) and unsuccessfully contested the election of Frederick C. Hicks to the Sixty-fourth Congress. He was special assistant to the Secretary of the Interior from March 1917 to October 1918, and served as a private in the Tank Corps during the First World War. He was joint secretary of President Woodrow Wilson's Industrial Conference in 1919 and was a delegate to the Democratic National Conventions in 1920, 1924, and 1936. He studied monetary theory at the Graduate School of Harvard University from 1928 to 1932.

The family lived in a series of houses beginning on Long Island where Brown bought a 100-acre estate on St. James Harbor where they raised and raced horses. They commissioned Archibald Manning Brown to design a large, modern country house, although they never lived in it. (It's now known as the Knox School). While Brown served in Congress and as the assistant to the Secretary of Interior, they lived near the White House in Washington. They later moved to Manhattan, then The Windmill on Montauk Point, and Boston.

== Purchase of ranch in Big Sur ==
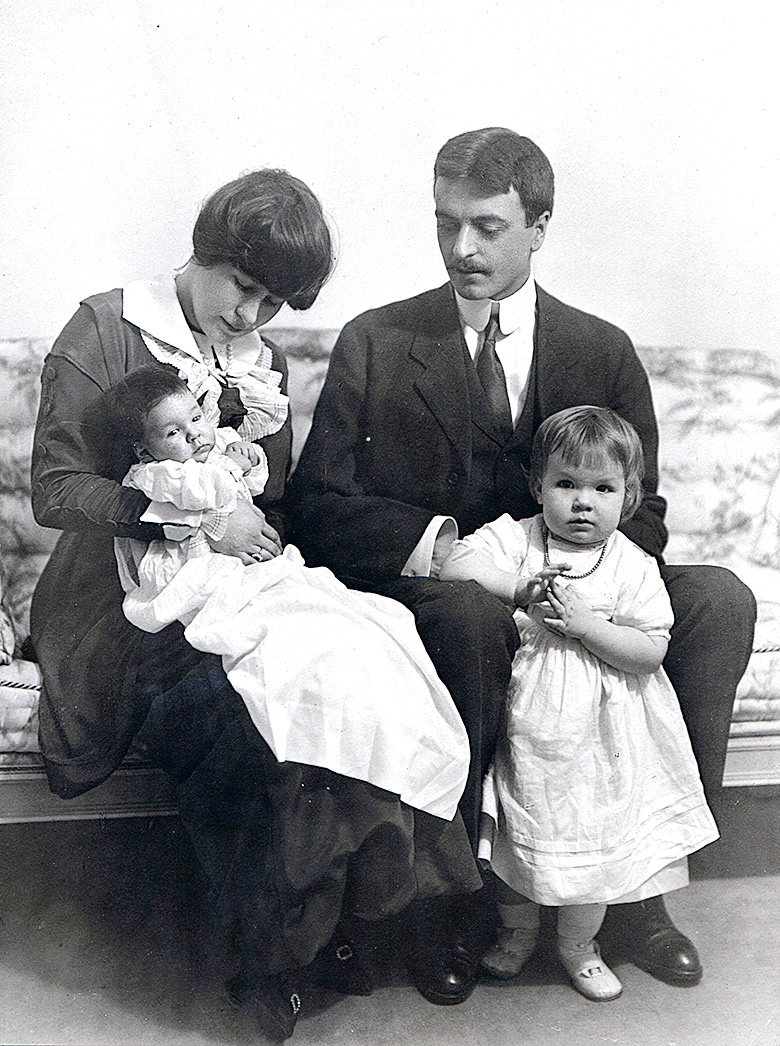
Hélène Hooper Brown, Lathrop Brown, and daughters Halla and Camilla, about 1915

In 1924, Brown and his wife Hélène Hooper Brown, who at age 15 in 1910, inherited $10,000,000 and became an orphan at the same time, visited Big Sur, California, seeking some wild land on which they might build a house. They bought the Saddle Rock Ranch totaling 1,600 acres from pioneer homesteader Christopher McWay, after which Julia Pfieffer Burns leased some land for cattle. Hélène became a good friend of Julia until the latter died in 1928.

=== Build Waterfall House on coast ===
The Browns first built a redwood cabin on the cliffs across from McWay Falls, which at the time fell directly into the ocean. It was located where the Waterfall Overlook is today, but the location then and now is often shrouded by a marine layer of cold fog. The Carmel-San Simeon Highway was completed in 1937, and in 1940 the Browns constructed "Waterfall House" to replace the cabin. The multi-story house had a 16 foot wide marble staircase at its base and fine furnishings.

An ornamental brass fish, a large gold octopus with long tentacles, and a compass rose were inlaid in the entryway. They decorated the home with art by Degas, Dufy and Gauguin. Very large windows overlooking the Pacific Ocean. Hélène Brown's bedroom was the only room with a direct view of the waterfall. The small room was painted entirely black and had gold stars on the ceiling. One large window looked out on the falls. The bathroom adjacent to her bedroom was finished in a deep blue tile inlaid with gold, and mirrors were mounted and positioned to create endless reflections. Behind the house were terraced gardens and a caretaker's cottage.

The house was sited about halfway down the cliff from the newly completed highway. To reach it, visitors boarded a short funicular railway. It was a contemporary building. The house experienced the same weather conditions as the cabin before it. The Browns wanted a home above the fog line.

=== First electricity on coast ===
Hans Ewoldsen, the Saddle Rock Ranch foreman, built a Pelton wheel on McWay Creek in 1932. He worked in the machine shop of the highway construction crew, using hand-split redwood from the canyon and other materials he bought. The undershot wheel ran a 32-volt generator and was the first electric power in the Big Sur area. It supplied power to three residences, a blacksmith shop, and the Funicular railway.

=== Construct Tin House inland ===
In 1944, during World War II, they decided to build a house three miles inland on a ridge high above the fog. War-time rationing of vital supplies - included building materials - meant some ingenuity was required for the project. A side impact of the rationing was that gasoline was in short supply, forcing some gas stations out of business.

The Browns saw opportunity in adversity and bought two abandoned gas station buildings. They selected a site on a ridge 1,960 ft (597m) above the coast, built a road, hired a crew to haul the deconstructed tin gas stations up the steep road, and paid an architect to assemble a home using those various parts.

When complete, the distinctive, modern house had bold lines, along with a kitchen, living room, and quarters for a maid. The family called it the "Gas Station" house, although it later become known as "Tin House". The home had spectacular views. The main windows in the large living room looked not out to sea, but up and down the coast. A wall was constructed facing due west to block the intense, direct rays of the afternoon sun. The living room was richly painted in blue. Despite the beautiful sights above the reach of the fog, legend has it that the Browns only spent one night in the new residence. They hadn't anticipated the metal siding and roof expanding and contracting with the day-time heat and night-time cold, and the unexpected, noisy popping and creaking from the tin siding was unacceptable to the Browns. After a sleepless night, they never returned.

Brown was elected to the sheriff's posse of Monterey County in 1947. A story exists that Tin House was built as a vacation getaway for President Franklin D. Roosevelt. In actuality, Lathrop Brown and Franklin Roosevelt were childhood friends and each other's best man when they married. But FDR never visited the Tin House.

Lathrop and Hélène left Big Sur for Florida in 1956, where Lathrop died in 1959. In 1961, Hélène Hooper Brown donated the entire property to the state, stipulating that it be used as a park and named for her good friend, Julia Pfeiffer Burns, a "true pioneer." She included the requirement that Waterfall House be converted into a museum within five years to house Big Sur history, otherwise that it be razed. For several reasons this was not accomplished and the mansion was demolished in 1966. The Waterfall Overlook of McWay Falls was built on that spot. Visitors to the site today can view the remnants of the home's landscaping, including palm trees. The Pelton wheel is on display as well.

== Later life and legacy ==
Brown was a member of a committee to supervise the Harvard Kennedy School in 1954 and 1955. He died on November 28, 1959, aged 76, in Fort Myers, Florida, and was cremated; the ashes were interred in Abbey of the Light, Manasota Memorial Park, Sarasota, Florida. His home at Nissequogue, New York, known as Land of Clover, was added to the National Register of Historic Places in 1993.

U.S. House of Representatives
Preceded by Martin W. Littleton	Member of the U.S. House of Representatives from New York's 1st congressional district 1913-1915	Succeeded by Frederick C. Hicks
