= Cove =

Small sheltered bay or coastal inlet

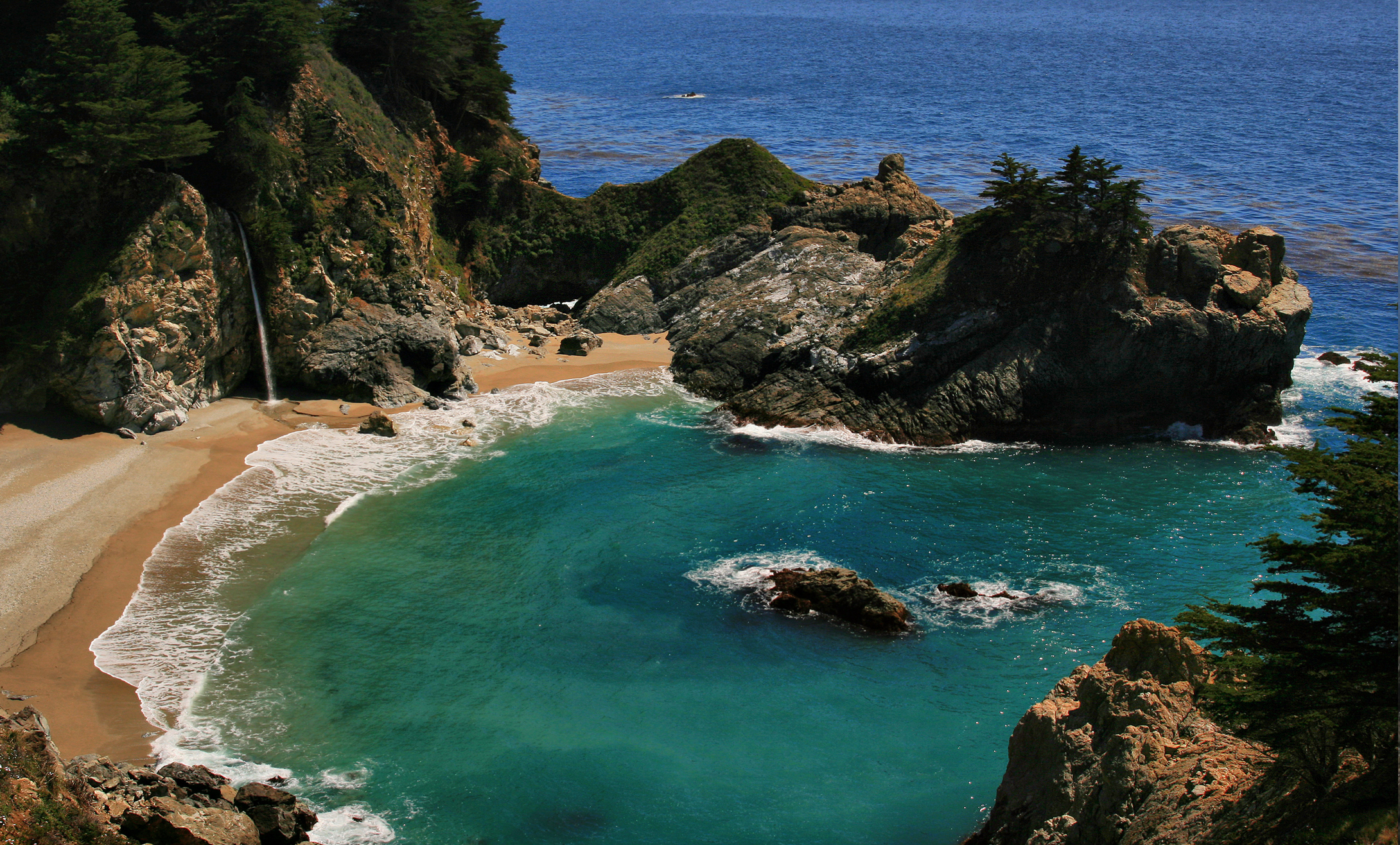
McWay Cove, California, United States

A cove is a small bay or coastal inlet. They usually have narrow, restricted entrances, are often circular or oval, and are often situated within a larger bay. Small, narrow, sheltered bays, inlets, tidal creeks, or recesses in a coast are often considered coves.

Colloquially, the term can be used to describe a sheltered bay. Geomorphology describes coves as precipitously walled and rounded cirque-like openings like a valley extending into or down a mountainside, or in a hollow or nook of a cliff or steep mountainside. A cove can also refer to a corner, nook, or cranny, either in a river, road, or wall, especially where the wall meets the floor.

== Formation ==
Map showing two examples of how coves form. The rock types are those of Lulworth Cove. In example A, a river breaks through the resistant chalk back rock and limestone, leaving the weak clays to be rapidly eroded. In example B, the sea breaks through the limestone, perhaps by forming a cave, and then erodes the clay away.

Coves are formed by differential erosion, which occurs when softer rocks are worn away faster than the harder rocks surrounding them. These rocks further erode to form a circular bay with a narrow entrance, called a cove. Another way is that waves can transport rocks and sediment towards cliffs or rock faces, which helps erode softer rock and gradually form coves due to friction. Additionally, rivers or streams that flow into the sea can contribute to creating natural harbors. "Over time, the sediment carried by the flow of the water will help erode any soft, rocky areas," leading to the formation of a cove.
