= Sea otter conservation =

Effort to increase sea otter populations

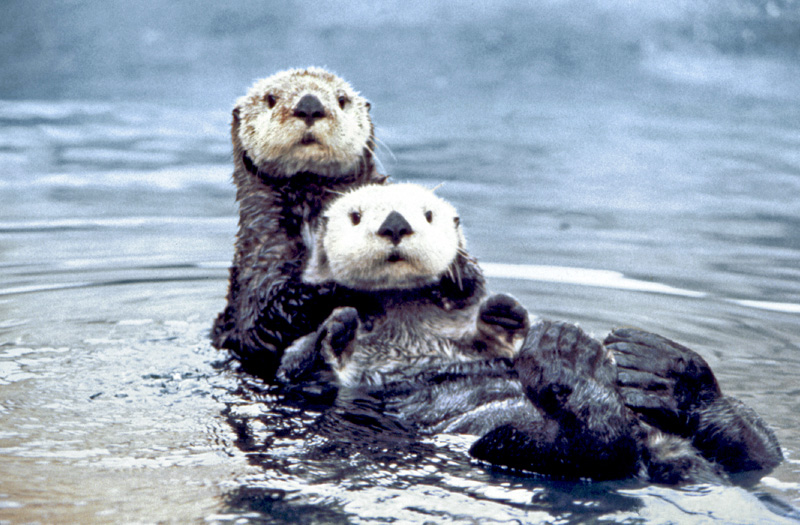
Sea otters in the Olympic Coast National Marine Sanctuary are descendants of otters translocated from Alaska in 1969 and 1970.

Sea otter conservation began in the early 20th century, when the sea otter was nearly extinct due to large-scale commercial hunting. The sea otter was once abundant in a wide arc across the North Pacific ocean, from northern Japan to Alaska to Mexico. By 1911, hunting for the animal's luxurious fur had reduced the sea otter population to fewer than 2000 individuals in the most remote and inaccessible parts of its range. The IUCN lists the sea otter as an endangered species. Threats to sea otters include oil spills, and a major spill can rapidly kill thousands of the animals.

During the 20th century, sea otter populations recovered from remnant populations in the far east of Russia, western Alaska, and California. Beginning in the 1960s, efforts to translocate sea otters to previously populated areas were also successful in restoring sea otters to other parts of the west coast of North America. Populations in some areas are now thriving, and the recovery of the sea otter is considered one of the greatest successes in marine conservation.

In three important parts of its range, however, sea otter populations have recently declined or have plateaued at depressed levels. In the Aleutian Islands, a massive and unexpected disappearance of sea otters has occurred since the 1980s. The cause of the decline is not known, although the observed pattern of disappearances is consistent with a rise in orca predation. In Russia, the sea otter population has declined precipitously, with illegal poaching suspected as a possible cause. In the 1990s, California's sea otter population stopped growing for reasons that are probably different from the difficulties facing Alaska's otters. A high prevalence of infectious disease in juveniles and adults has been found to cause many sea otter deaths. A parasite, which is often fatal to sea otters, is carried in the feces of wild and domestic cats. Oil spills are also threatening to sea otters, both for the toxins released into the water and potential for hypothermia resulting from a degradation of the insulating layer of the otters' fur.

== Background ==
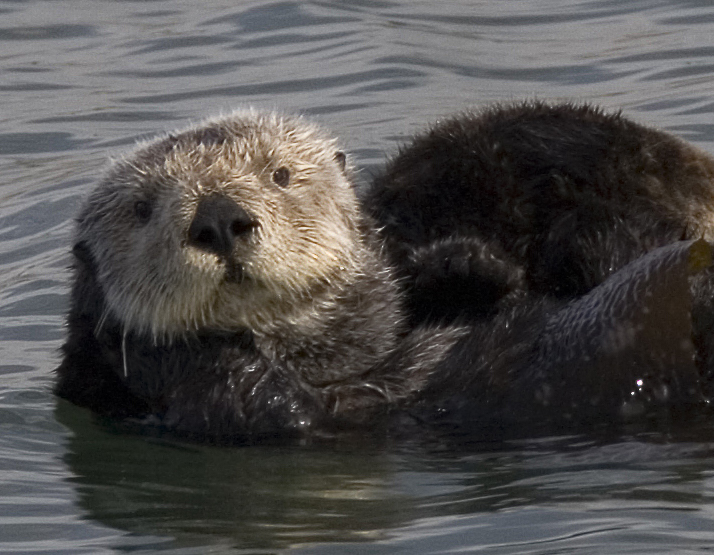
The recovery of the sea otter from the verge of extinction is considered one of the greatest successes in marine conservation.

The sea otter (Enhydra lutris) is a marine mammal living near the shores of the North Pacific, from northern Japan, the Kuril Islands and Kamchatka east across the Aleutian Islands and along the North American coast to Mexico. It has the thickest fur in the animal kingdom. Between 1741 and 1911, a period of extensive hunting for sea otter pelts, known as "the Great Hunt", brought the world population to 1,000 – 2,000 individuals in a fraction of the species' historic range. Since then, most commercial hunting of the species has been banned, although a limited amount of hunting by indigenous peoples has been permitted.

The sea otter preys mostly upon invertebrates such as sea urchins, diverse mollusks and crustaceans, and some species of fish. In most of its range, it is a keystone species, with a stabilizing effect on its local ecosystem that is disproportionate to its size and abundance. Sea otters control sea urchin populations which, left unchecked, can destroy kelp forests and harm the species relying on these ecosystems.

Because of the sea otter's crucial ecological role, as well as the animal's aesthetic and cultural value, particular efforts have been made to protect the species and to expand its range. Conservation of the sea otter is complicated by the fact that some of its preferred prey species, such as some species of abalone, crabs, and clams, are also eaten by humans. Because of the species' reputation for depleting shellfish resources, advocates for commercial, recreational, and subsistence shellfish harvesting have often opposed allowing the sea otter's range to increase, and there have even been instances of fishermen and others illegally killing them.

The sea otter's range is currently discontinuous. It is absent from about a third of its former range, including all of Oregon and northern California, and it has only recently begun to reappear in Mexico and northern Japan. Sea otters can do well in captivity, and are featured in over 40 public aquaria and zoos. The southern sea otter (E. l. nereis), whose range historically spanned from Baja, California up to the shorelines of Oregon and Washington, now only occurs from Southern California to just north of Half Moon Bay, California. What was historically a vast population now numbers just over 3000 as of 2006 census. The largest extant population of sea otters can be found in the waters surrounding Alaska. While population numbers of the northern sea otter (E. l. kenyoni) located in this region have still declined, the population hasn't been affected nearly as drastically as southern sea otters.

== Conservation issues ==
Research conducted by the U.S. Geological Survey suggests that food availability is the major determinant in sea otter population growth. The IUCN describes the significant threats to sea otters as oil pollution, predation by orcas, poaching, and conflicts with fisheries. Sea otters can drown if entangled in fishing gear. They can also be stressed by well-meaning human watchers who approach too closely. The most significant threat to sea otters is oil spills. Unlike most other marine mammals, sea otters have very little subcutaneous fat. Otters rely primarily on their fur to be clean, dense, and water resistant in order to be insulated from the cold. When their fur is soaked with oil, it loses its ability to retain air, which can lead to hypothermia. The liver, kidneys, and lungs of sea otters also become damaged after they inhale oil or ingest it when grooming.

The small geographic ranges of the sea otter populations in California, Washington, and British Columbia mean that a single major spill could be catastrophic for that state or province. Prevention of oil spills, and preparation for the rescue of otters in the event one occurs, are major areas of focus for conservation efforts. Increasing the size and the range of sea otter populations will also mitigate the species-level effects of catastrophic oil spills.

Sea otters must maintain a high level of internal heat production in order to compensate for a lack of blubber. Because of this, sea otters need to consume food equal to 25% of their body mass every day to satisfy their high energetic requirements. Consequently, depending on the habitat, reproductive status, and per capita prey presence, hunting for food can cost sea otters between 20 and 50% of the day foraging.

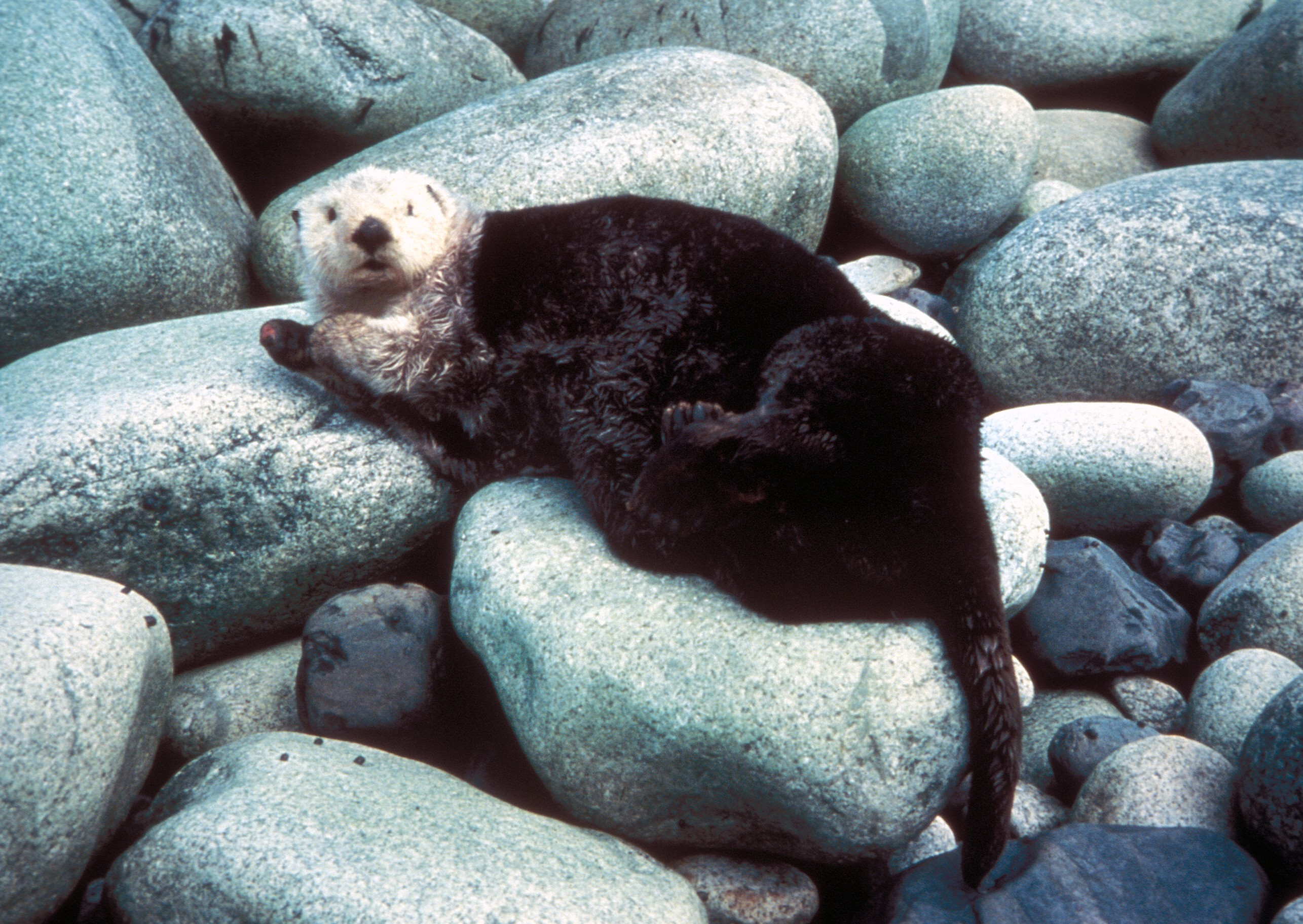
Sea otter in the Yukon Delta National Wildlife Refuge.

Marine protected areas provide good habitat in which activities such as dumping waste and drilling for oil are not permitted. The sea otter population within the Monterey Bay National Marine Sanctuary is estimated to be more than 1,200. At the Olympic Coast National Marine Sanctuary there are over 500.

=== Restoration and ecosystem recovery ===
Sea otter conservation is important in marine restoration ecology because of their role in regulating ecosystems, particularly kelp forests. In areas where sea otter populations have recovered, trophic cascade effects may be observed. Beyond increased biodiversity, and healthier food-chains, healthy kelp forest ecosystems are excellent carbon sinks. However, sea otter recovery has the potential to increase human–wildlife conflicts, particularly due to the sea otter's predation in shellfish fisheries.

=== Future directions ===
Focused research over the past 60 years has helped the global sea otter population rebound from fewer than 2,000 individuals in the early 20th century to roughly 130,000 as of 2021; however, this species remains imperiled. The future of sea otter conservation will require more fine-grain estimation of local populations and complimentary local and international monitoring programs, quantification of the downstream trophic effects of sea otter populations on their littoral communities, and developing methods to reduce human–wildlife conflicts in areas where sea otter populations are recovering. Quantitative models of sea otter behavior and population dynamics will also be critical in anticipating the likely effects of future interventions and population trends.

== Russia ==
Before the 19th century, there were around 20,000 to 25,000 sea otters in the Kuril Islands, with more on Kamchatka and the Commander Islands. After the years of the Great Hunt, the population in these areas, currently part of Russia, was only 750. In 2004, sea otters had repopulated all of their former habitat in these areas, with an estimated total population of about 27,000. Of these, about 19,000 were in the Kurils, 2000 to 3500 on Kamchatka and another 5000 to 5500 on the Commander Islands. The success of the sea otter's recovery in Russia has been credited to large-scale and long-term protection, enlargement of the species' range, and human emigration from the islands.

However, much more recent counts of the sea otter population from the years 2019–2024 have shown steep declines in every region, casting doubt on those estimates. The latest numbers put the number of sea otters around the Kuril Islands at a mere 3,000, and at 1,673 and 1,565 sea otters around the Commander Islands and Kamchatka peninsula, respectively. Continued illegal poaching in Russia is believed to contribute to these declines. Russian non-governmental organizations (NGOs) such as the Nature and People Foundation have increased their efforts to bring attention to the plight of Russia's sea otter population.

== Japan ==
Sea otter sightings have been documented in the waters of Cape Nosappu, Erimo, Hamanaka and Nemuro, among other locations in the region. The last count estimated around 50 sea otters living off the coast of eastern Hokkaido. The Etopirika Foundation (エトピリカ基金), a small non-profit organization run by Yoshihiro Kataoka, monitors the local sea otter population and researches ways to protect them. In April 2025, Kataoka documented the first lethal case of avian influenza among sea otters.

== Alaska ==
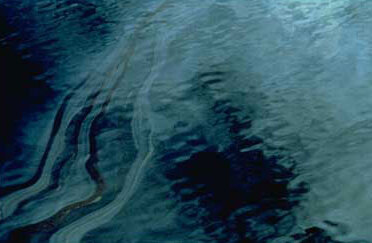
In the wake of the Exxon Valdez oil spill, heavy sheens of oil covered large areas of Prince William Sound.

Colonies were discovered around Alaska's Aleutian Islands and Prince William Sound in the 1930s. A sanctuary was created in Amchitka Island, whose sea otter population grew to outstrip its supply of prey. By the mid-1960s, Amchitka Island was being used a site for nuclear testing, which eventually killed many sea otters in the area. In advance of a major test in 1968, the U.S. Atomic Energy Commission agreed to move hundreds of the animals to other parts of the coast. Seven hundred sea otters were transplanted in the 1960s and 1970s, with survival rates improving as scientists became more knowledgeable about how to safely transport the animals. In 1973, the sea otter population in Alaska was estimated at between 100,000 and 125,000 animals. During this year, the U.S. Departments of Interior and Commerce administered the Endangered Species Act of 1973 ( ESA) to stop the extinction of plants and wild animals in the United States, other foreign nations, and at sea. As of 2021, about 90% of sea otters live in Coastal Alaska, specifically their national parks such as Glacier Bay, Kenai Fjords, and Kodiak National Wildlife Refuge.

=== Declines in the Aleutian Islands ===
In the 1980s, the population in the Aleutian Islands of western Alaska was home to an estimated 55,000 to 100,000 sea otters, but the population plummeted to around 6,000 animals by 2000. One controversial hypothesis is that orcas have been preying on the otters. The evidence in support of this explanation is circumstantial: It is unlikely that the otters have been dying from disease or starvation, as few bodies of sick or emaciated otters have been recovered. Also, populations have declined in areas of open water frequented by orcas, but not in nearby lagoons where orcas are absent.

Some Alaska orcas specialize in preying on marine mammals and others on fish. The orcas that prefer marine mammal prey usually attack seals, sea lions, and small cetaceans, and have occasionally been seen preying on gray whale calves. The small, furry sea otter offers little nutrition for an orca; however, orcas are so large that a handful of individual whales on a diet of sea otters would account for the disappearance of thousands of otters. According to one theory known as "sequential megafauna collapse," orcas may have started eating otters due to shortages of their usual, much larger, prey. The region's population of large whales was decimated by commercial whaling in the 1960s. Then, stocks of harbor seals and Steller sea lions experienced massive declines in the 1970s and 1980s, respectively, which may have forced orcas to seek smaller prey. The theory that orca predation has been responsible for these declines remains controversial, and so far, there has been no direct evidence that orcas prey on sea otters to any significant extent.

=== Exxon Valdez oil spill ===
The March 1989 Exxon Valdez oil spill devastated the sea otter population in Prince William Sound. Over 1,000 oiled sea otter carcasses were recovered, with the actual number of deaths estimated to be several times that number. Approximately 350 oiled sea otters were rescued, and over the next five months, they were given intensive rehabilitation. Each otter was tranquilized and thoroughly washed and dried. Those that had swallowed a lot of oil were treated with activated charcoal. The effort saved about 200 of the 350 rescued sea otters, although many later died after being released. Although few sea otters were saved in the rescue effort, much knowledge was gained about how to successfully rehabilitate oiled sea otters. A 2006 report from the Exxon Valdez Oil Spill Trustee Council named the sea otter as one of several species still being affected by the lingering oil in the area.

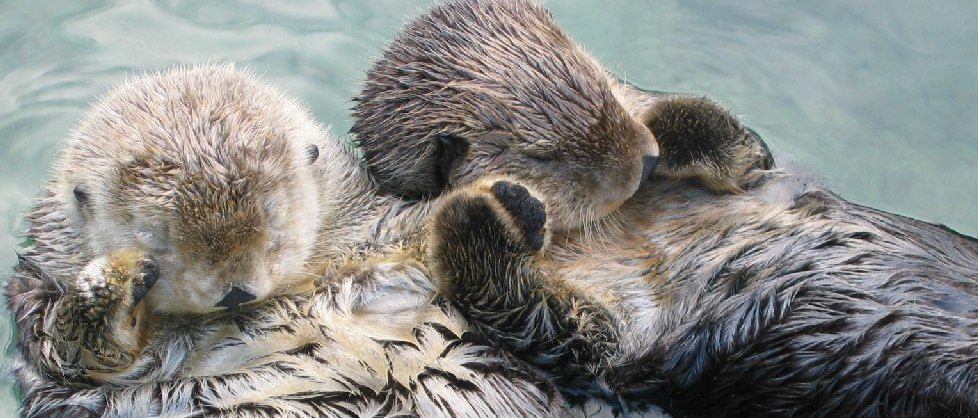
The thick fur of the sea otter once made it a target for large-scale hunting, and makes it vulnerable to oil spills today.

=== Current status ===
As of 2021, there are an estimated 98,780 sea otters in Alaska. In August 2005, the "southwest Alaska Distinct Population Segment" of the sea otter was listed as "threatened" under the Endangered Species Act. A little over a year later, the Arizona-based Center for Biological Diversity filed a lawsuit arguing that the U.S. Fish and Wildlife Service had failed to designate critical habitat for the species, as required by the Endangered Species Act.

== British Columbia and Washington ==
Between 1969 and 1972, 89 sea otters were flown or shipped from Alaska to the west coast of Vancouver Island, British Columbia. They established a healthy population, estimated to be over 3,000 as of 2004, and their range is now from Tofino to Cape Scott. However, the First Nations people in the area had not been consulted before the relocations took place. Although the translocated sea otters improved the general health of the ecosystem, they depleted shellfish and sea urchins that local indigenous communities had come to reply upon, and many in these communities came to regret the return of the otters.

In 1989, a separate colony was discovered in the central B.C. coast. It is not known if this colony, which had a size of about 300 animals in 2004, was founded by translocated otters or by survivors of the fur trade. The sea otter is considered a threatened species in Canada and is protected under the federal Species at Risk Act (SARA). In April 2007, the Committee on the Status of Endangered Wildlife in Canada changed its assessment of the sea otter from "threatened" to "special concern." The committee's assessment reflects the ongoing strength of the B.C. population and may lead to a reduction of its legal status under SARA.

Fifty-nine sea otters were translocated from Amchitka Island to Washington in 1969 and 1970, with annual surveys between 2000 and 2004 recording between 504 and 743 individuals. The state has listed the sea otter as an endangered species since 1981.

== Central and Southern California ==
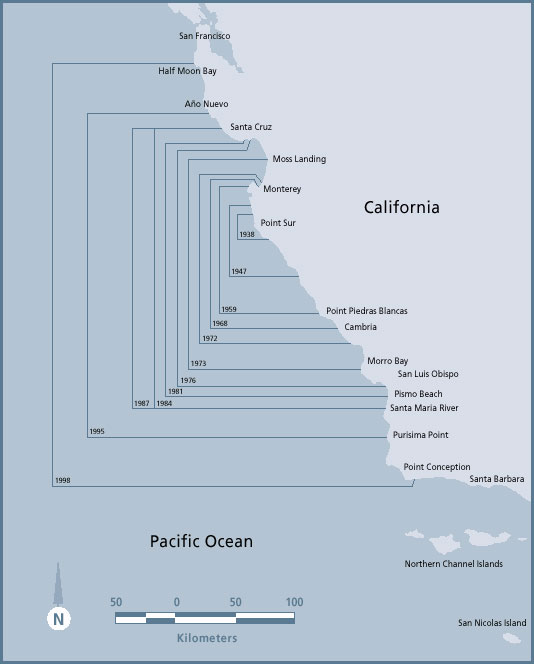
In 1938, the population in California was only about 50 animals. It has rebounded to around 3,000, still far below the estimated pre-fur trade population of 16,000.

California is the only location where the southern sea otter (Enhydra lutris nereis) subspecies is found in significant numbers. In 1938, a couple testing a telescope discovered a group of about 50 of these animals in a remote part of the coast near Big Sur, California. With conservation efforts, including the crucial pioneering of Monterey marine protected area by Julia Platt and Margaret Wentworth Owings and the Friends of the Sea Otter organization, this group has since grown and expanded its range. However, recovery has been slow in comparison to sea otter populations elsewhere, and also in comparison to sympatric marine mammal species such as California sea lions and harbor seals. Its average growth rate between 1914 and 1984 was only 5%, and it fluctuated or declined in the late 1990s. The southern sea otter was listed under the Endangered Species Act as a threatened subspecies in 1977. A survey taken in the spring of 2007 counted a little over 3,000 sea otters in California, up slightly from previous years but down from an estimated pre-fur trade population of 16,000. For the subspecies to be delisted from the list of threatened species, the count must average 3,090 or more over three years. To aid in the efforts of sea otter preservation, the Monterey Bay Aquarium's Sea Otter Program has been observing southern sea otters from as far back as 1984.

The expansion of the sea otter population brought it into conflict with shellfish fisheries. Beginning in the 1980s, the U.S. Fish and Wildlife Service attempted to manage the competition between sea otters and fishermen by creating an "otter-free zone" from Point Conception to the U.S.-Mexico border. In this zone, only San Nicolas Island was designated as sea otter habitat, and sea otters found elsewhere in the area were supposed to be captured and relocated. These plans were abandoned after it proved impractical to capture the hundreds of otters which continued to swim into the zone.

In December 2014, the U.S. Fish and Wildlife Service received a tip that a man docking his boat in Moss Landing, California, shot at a mother sea otter with a pellet gun. The otter was nursing twin pups at the time of the incident.

=== Population health ===
The causes of the recent difficulties for California's sea otters are not well understood. As the birth rate in California is comparable to rates in other, rapidly growing sea otter populations, the decline is attributed to high rates of mortality. Unusually high mortality rates amongst adult and young adult otters, particularly females, have been reported. Disease is believed to be a leading cause, and other possible mortality factors include water contamination and drowning in fishing nets.

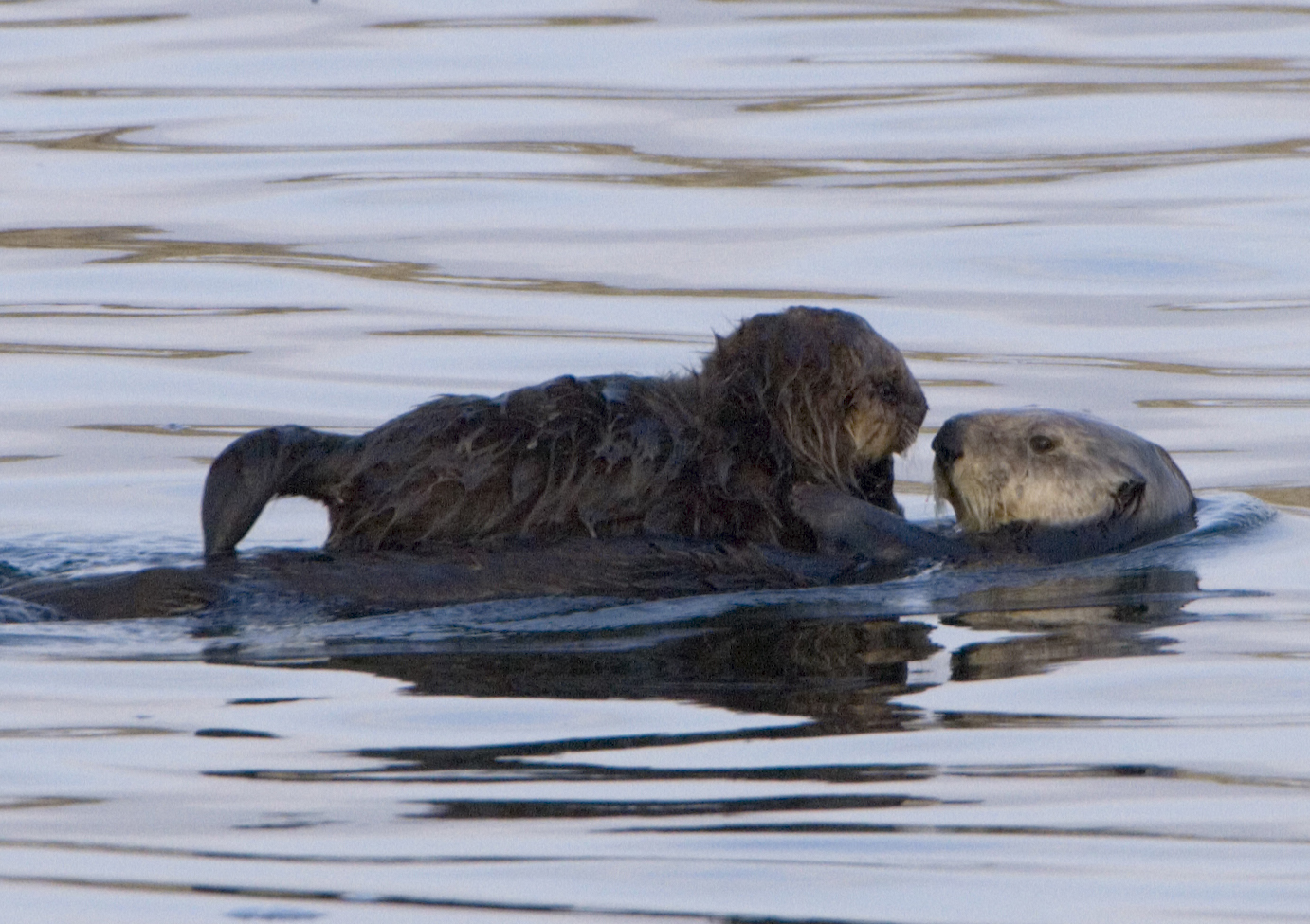
In California, adults of breeding age have experienced high levels of mortality in recent years.

Although the bodies of dead sea otters often sink at sea, necropsies of beached carcasses provide some insights into the causes of mortality. A study of 105 sea otters that had washed ashore between 1998 and 2001 determined the major causes of death to be protozoal encephalitis, acanthocephalan parasite infection, shark attack, and cardiac disease. Infectious disease alone caused 63.8% of deaths, and in most of these cases the disease was caused by parasites. Infection, particularly Toxoplasma gondii encephalitis, was often present in otters that had died of cardiac disease, suggesting that infection may have contributed to the onset of cardiac disease. T. gondii encephalitis was also strongly associated with shark bites, perhaps because the disease causes abnormal behavior that increases the likelihood of shark attack.

In one study, 42 percent of live sea otters surveyed had antibodies to the T. gondii parasite, an almost certain sign of infection. The parasite, which is often fatal to sea otters, is carried in the feces of wild and domestic cats. As the parasite can be carried into the ocean via the sewage system, cat owners have been encouraged to dispose of droppings in the trash rather than flushing them.

Although it is clear that disease has contributed to the deaths of many of California's sea otters, it is not known why the California population would be more vulnerable to disease than populations in other areas. It has been proposed that a low level of genetic variation of the population, due to its history of population bottlenecks, may be a contributing factor.

== Northern California and Oregon ==
Attempts were made to move 93 sea otters to the Oregon coast in the 1970s. None have been seen since the early 1980s. It is not known if they died or moved away.

Under a directive from Congress, the U.S. Fish and Wildlife Service evaluated the feasibility of reintroducing sea otters to their historical range along the West Coast of the contiguous United States. The Service focused the assessment on Northern California and Oregon, where potential sea otter reintroduction would have the greatest conservation value. The Service's 2022 assessment indicates reintroduction is feasible, but it does not provide a recommendation as to whether sea otter reintroduction should take place. Additional information and stakeholder input would be needed to help inform any future reintroduction proposal if the initiative moves forward. The Elakha Alliance, an Oregon nonprofit led by tribal and conservation leaders that support the reintroduction of sea otters, commissioned its own scientific feasibility study, which reached similar conclusions. The Service and Elakha studies found that a robust social and economic impact analysis must address the concerns within the fishing industry.

== Sea Otter Surrogacy ==
In 2002, the Monterey Bay Aquarium developed and established the Sea Otter Surrogacy Program to increase the endangered sea otter population. Their efforts focus on boosting the survivability of orphaned sea otter pups once released. This program pairs a mother otter with an otter pup to educate them on the essential skills of being an otter.

Upon the intake of an orphaned otter, aquarists don black gowns and masks to conceal their human appearance when caring for the otter. Otter pups must avoid direct interaction with humans to ensure that they maintain minimal contact with humans upon release into the wild. After behavioral observation, the scientists pair the otter pups and surrogate mothers together, picking potential mothers from a group of nonreleasable females.

Pups are gradually introduced to their surrogate mothers and closely monitored throughout the process. When the pair exhibit behaviors such as nuzzling, grooming, sharing food, and embracing, they are considered bonded. Once bonded, mothers teach the adopted pups critical survival skills such as foraging and grooming. Researches focus on six essential skills for a successful otter, including, (1) rolling belly to back to belly, (2) directional swimming, (3) first diving attempts, (4) half-body diving, (5) diving to depth, (6) foraging on seafood provisioned at depth within the holding pool.

Sea otter pups are released around 0.5-1.5 years of age. At this age, pups are successfully weaned from their surrogate mother. During the two weeks after release, known as the soft-release period, pups are monitored using radio telemetry and visual observation to determine foraging success or possible signs of stress. If otters exhibit stress symptoms, they are recaptured, rehabilitated, and released once again. Healthy otters are monitored 1-5 times per week until death, disappearance, the conclusion of the study, or inability to monitor.

Chosen for its established otter population, resource abundance, and accessibility, Elkhorn Slough serves as the release site for 37 otter pups from 2002-2016. Elkhorn Slough is an estuary that spans seven miles along the Monterey Bay coast and is home to over 100 sea otters and various other species. The Sea Otter Surrogacy Program has led to a measurable boost in the sea otter population in Elkhorn Slough. Researchers estimate that half of the otter population originates from surrogate otters who participated in the program, resulting in a significant increase in the otter population.

== Bibliography ==
- Kenyon, Karl W. (1969). The Sea Otter in the Eastern Pacific Ocean. Washington, D.C.: U.S. Bureau of Sport Fisheries and Wildlife.
- Love, John A. (1992). Sea Otters. Golden, Colorado: Fulcrum Publishing. ISBN 1-55591-123-4.
- Nickerson, Roy (1989). Sea Otters, a Natural History and Guide. San Francisco, CA: Chronicle Books. ISBN 0-87701-567-8.
- Palumbi, Stephen R.; Sotka, Carolyn (2011). The Death and Life of Monterey Bay: A Story of Revival. Island Press. p. 224. ISBN 978-1-59726-987-2.
- Silverstein, Alvin; Silverstein, Virginia & Robert (1995). The Sea Otter. Brookfield, Connecticut: The Millbrook Press, Inc. ISBN 1-56294-418-5.
- VanBlaricom, Glenn R. (2001). Sea Otters. Stillwater, MN: Voyageur Press Inc. ISBN 0-89658-562-X.
