= Julia Pfeiffer Burns State Park =

State park in California, United States

- IUCN category III (natural monument or feature)
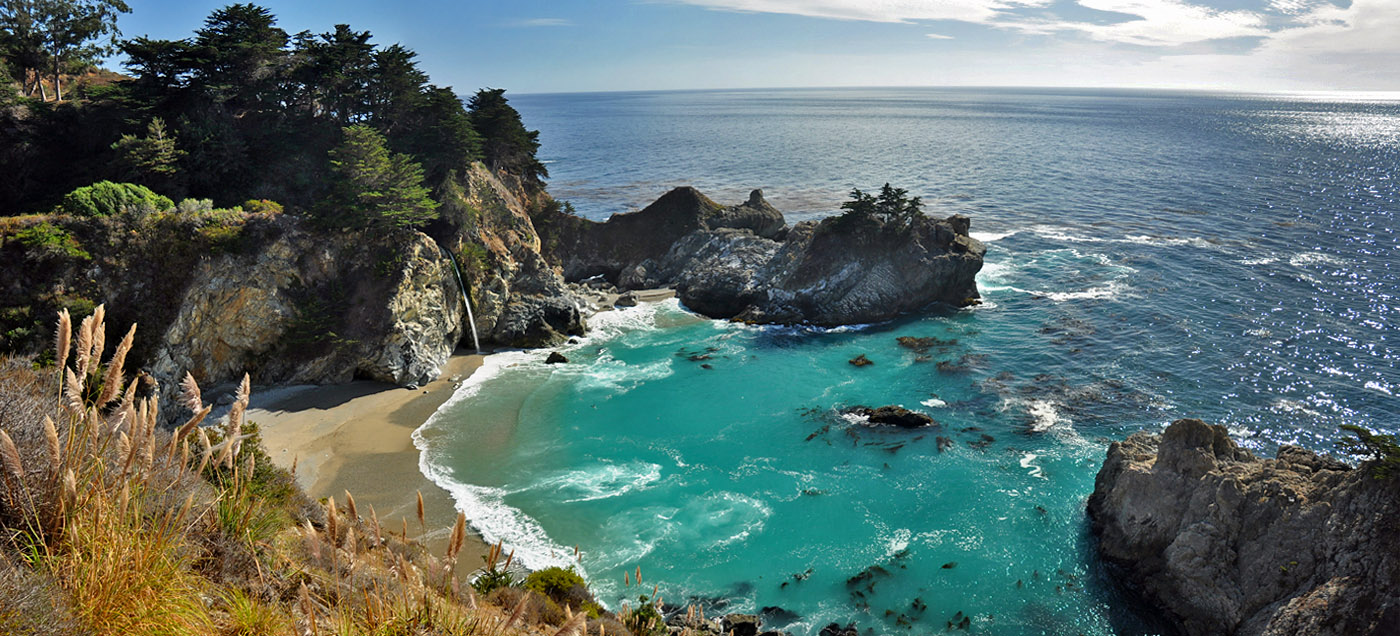
- The park's McWay Cove with McWay Falls

- Location within California Location within the United States
- Location: Monterey County, California, United States
- Nearest city: Carmel-by-the-Sea, California
- Coordinates: 36°10′15″N 121°40′23″W
- Area: 3,762 acres (1,522 ha)
- Established: 1962
- Governing body: California Department of Parks and Recreation

Julia Pfeiffer Burns State Park is a state park in California, 12 miles south of Pfeiffer Big Sur State Park on California's Pacific coast. A main feature of the park is McWay Falls, which drops over a cliff of 80 feet (24 m) into the Pacific Ocean. The park is also home to 300-foot (90 m) redwoods which are over 2,500 years old. The park is named after Julia Pfeiffer Burns, a respected resident and rancher in the Big Sur region in the early 20th century, who lived in the area for much of her life until her death in 1928. The 6-square-mile (16-square-kilometer) park was established in 1962.

== Location and history ==
=== Saddle Rock Ranch ===
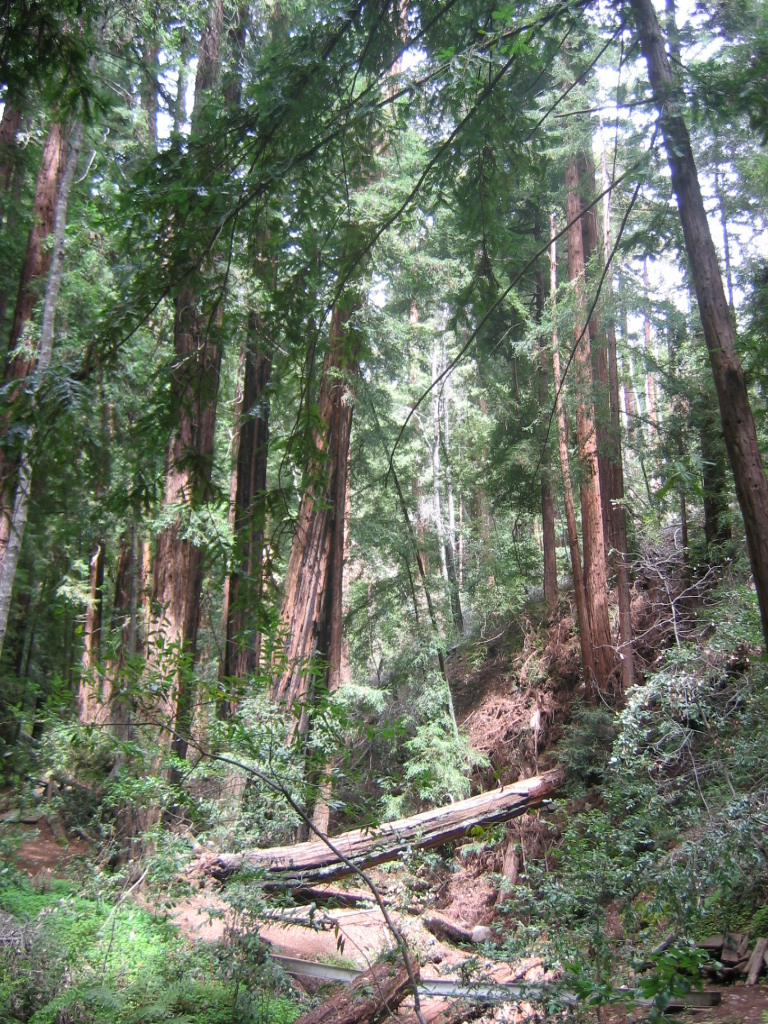
Redwoods in Julia Pfeiffer Burns State Park

Christopher and Rachel McWay homesteaded the property in the late 1870s. In 1924, former U.S. Representative Lathrop Brown and his wife Hélène were seeking an isolated point on the coast where they could build a home. They took a horse and mule trip to the Big Sur area and found Saddle Rock Cove where a waterfall poured over the rocky bluff into the Pacific. They purchased the adjacent 1,800 acres (730 ha) cattle ranch from McWay. Julia Pfeiffer Burns, daughter of pioneer homesteader Michael Pfeiffer, married John Burns in 1914 at age 47, and leased pasture from the Browns. A daughter of the first permanent settlers of European origin in Big Sur, she and her husband leased a ranch at Burns Creek and leased pasture from the McWays at Saddle Rock Ranch. Hélène formed a close friendship with Julia until she died in 1928.

The Browns first built a rough redwood cabin on a site at the top of cliffs opposite McWay Falls. Construction of the Carmel San Simeon Highway lasted from 1919 to 1937. Saddle Rock Ranch foreman Hans Ewoldsen worked in the machine shop of the highway construction crew to build a Pelton wheel. He used hand-split redwood from the canyon and other materials he bought. He installed the wheel on McWay Creek in 1932. The undershot wheel ran a 32-volt generator and was the first electric power in the Big Sur area. It supplied power to three residences, a blacksmith shop, and later a funicular railway that connected the home to the highway.

The Browns replaced the cabin in 1940 with a modern two-story home named Waterfall House. They built the home halfway down the cliff from the newly completed highway. It was reached by the funicular railway. It had gardens around the house and featured a view from the master bedroom of what was then named Saddle Rock Cove. The entryway was inlaid with an ornamental brass fish, a gold octopus, and a compass rose. The multi-story house had a 16 foot wide marble staircase at its base and was decorated with fine furnishings and classic paintings.

=== Tin House ===
In 1944, during World War II, they decided to build a house three miles inland on a ridge high above the fog. War-time rationing of vital supplies included building materials required some ingenuity. A side impact of the rationing was that gasoline was in short supply, forcing some gas stations out of business.

The Browns bought two abandoned gas station buildings. They selected a site on a ridge 1,960 ft (597m) above the coast. They had a 3 miles (4.8 km) road to the site built, hired a crew to haul the tin gas station parts up the steep road, and paid an architect to assemble a home using the various parts of the two gas stations.

When complete, the distinctive, modern house had bold lines. It had a kitchen, living room, and quarters for a maid. The family called it the Gas Station, although it later become known as Tin House. The views from the home included those from the main windows in the large living room which looked not out to sea but up and down the coast. A wall was constructed facing due west to block out the intense, direct rays of the afternoon sun. The living room was richly painted in blue.

But despite the sights above the reach of the fog, the Browns only spent one night in the new residence. They hadn't anticipated the metal siding and roof expanding and contracting with the daytime heat and night time cold, and the noisy popping and creaking that accompanied it. After one sleepless night, they never returned.

There are two hiking trails to the Tin House. The Tanbark Trail is located on the south side of the highway bridge. It is a seven-mile (11 km) round trip hike with a total 2,000 feet (610 m) elevation gain. The second route is the road used to bring construction materials to the site from Highway 1. It is one mile shorter, but much steeper and less scenic.

=== Land donated ===
Lathrop and Hélène left Big Sur for Florida in 1956 where Lathrop died in 1959. In 1961 Hélène Hooper Brown donated the entire property to the state, stipulating that it be used as a park and named for her good friend, Julia Pfeiffer Burns, "a true pioneer". She included the requirement that Waterfall House be converted into a "museum for the custody and display of indigenous Indian relics, flora and fauna of the California coastal area, and historical objects pertaining to the Big Sur country". The museum could not be completed in time for several reasons, including competing museums, shortage of funds, and poor access to the site. As required by the terms of the gift, the mansion was demolished in 1965.

== Recreation ==
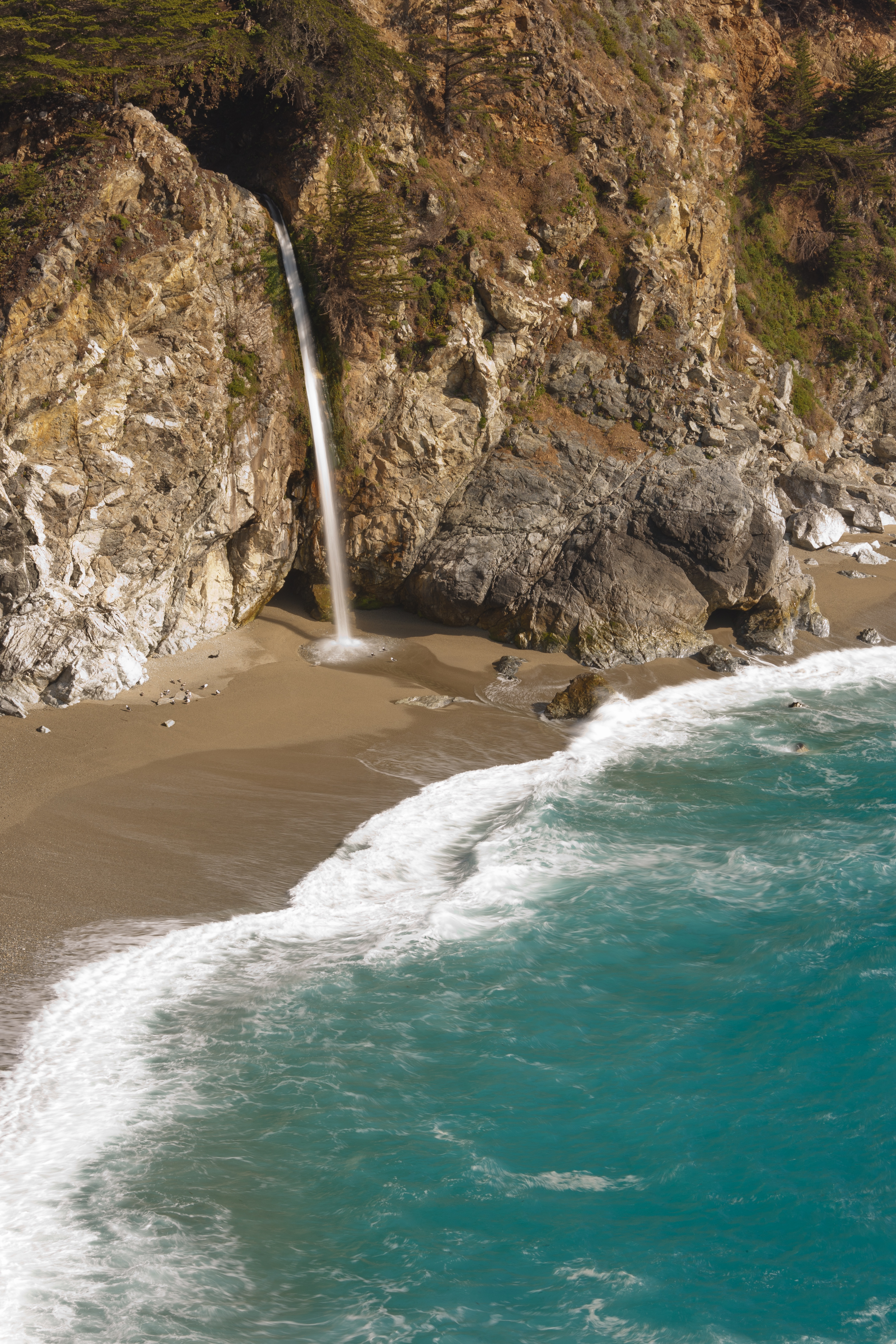
McWay Falls

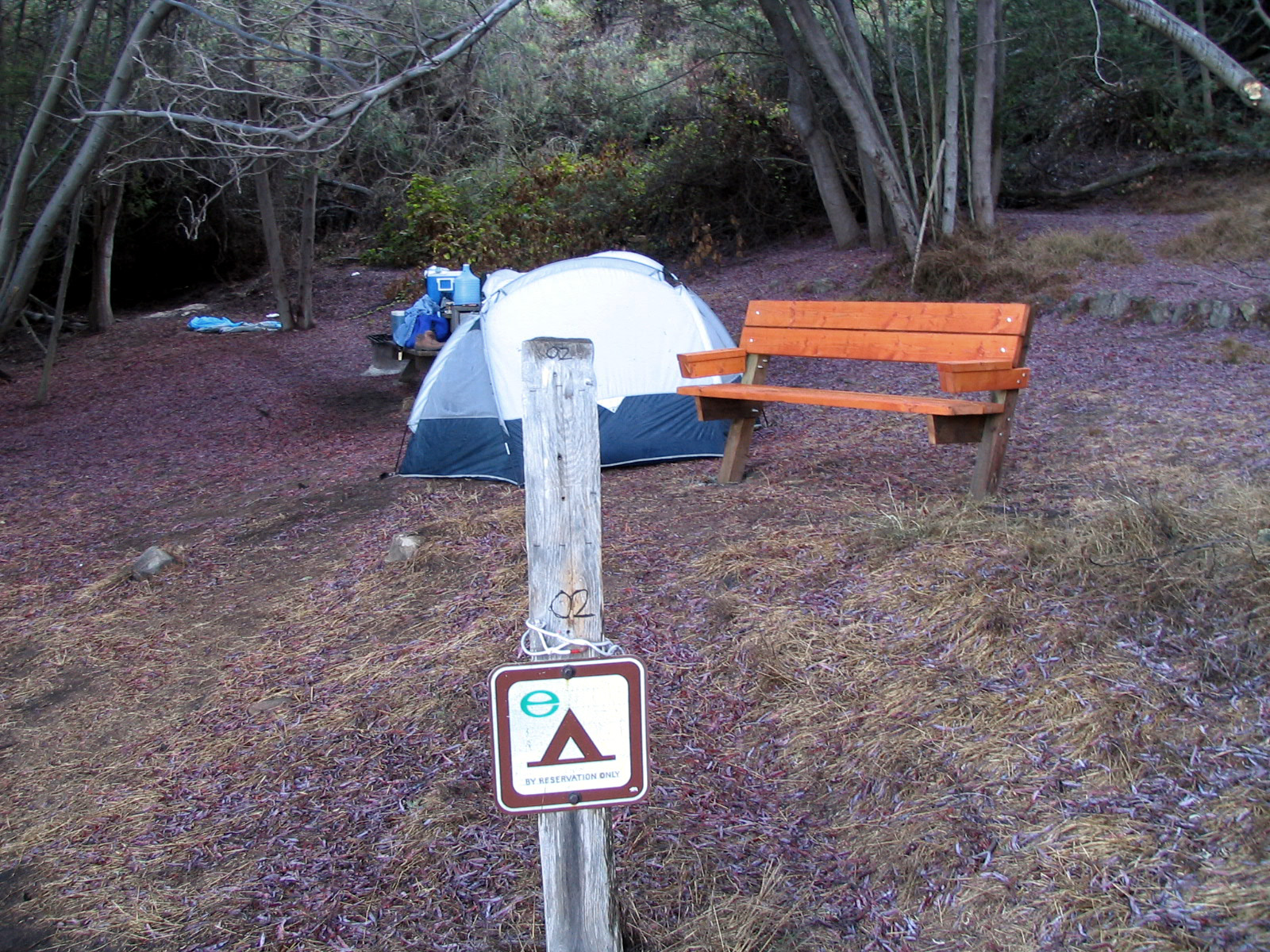
Campsite 2 and Mano Seca Bench

Julia Pfeiffer Burns State Park has two environmental hike-in camping areas, named by Sunset magazine as one of the "four best places to pitch a tent on the Pacific Coast". Both sites have exceptional views of the Pacific Coast, but access is restricted to those with camping reservations. The Julia Pfeiffer Burns Underwater Area is a popular location for scuba diving.

The summer 2008 California wildfires burned the upper parts of the park, but were stopped at Highway 1 and did not affect the camping sites. In early 2009 the many non-native acacia trees around the campsites were removed in order to restore vegetation native to the Big Sur Coast. Indigenous plants and trees were planted to replace them.

== Marine protected areas ==
Big Creek State Marine Reserve and Big Creek State Marine Conservation Area are marine protected areas offshore from Julia Pfeiffer Burns State Park. Like underwater parks, these marine protected areas help conserve ocean wildlife and marine ecosystems.

== See also ==
- Anderson Canyon
- Big Sur
- List of beaches in California
- List of California state parks
