= McWay Falls =

Tidefall in Julia Pfeiffer Burns State Park, California, United States

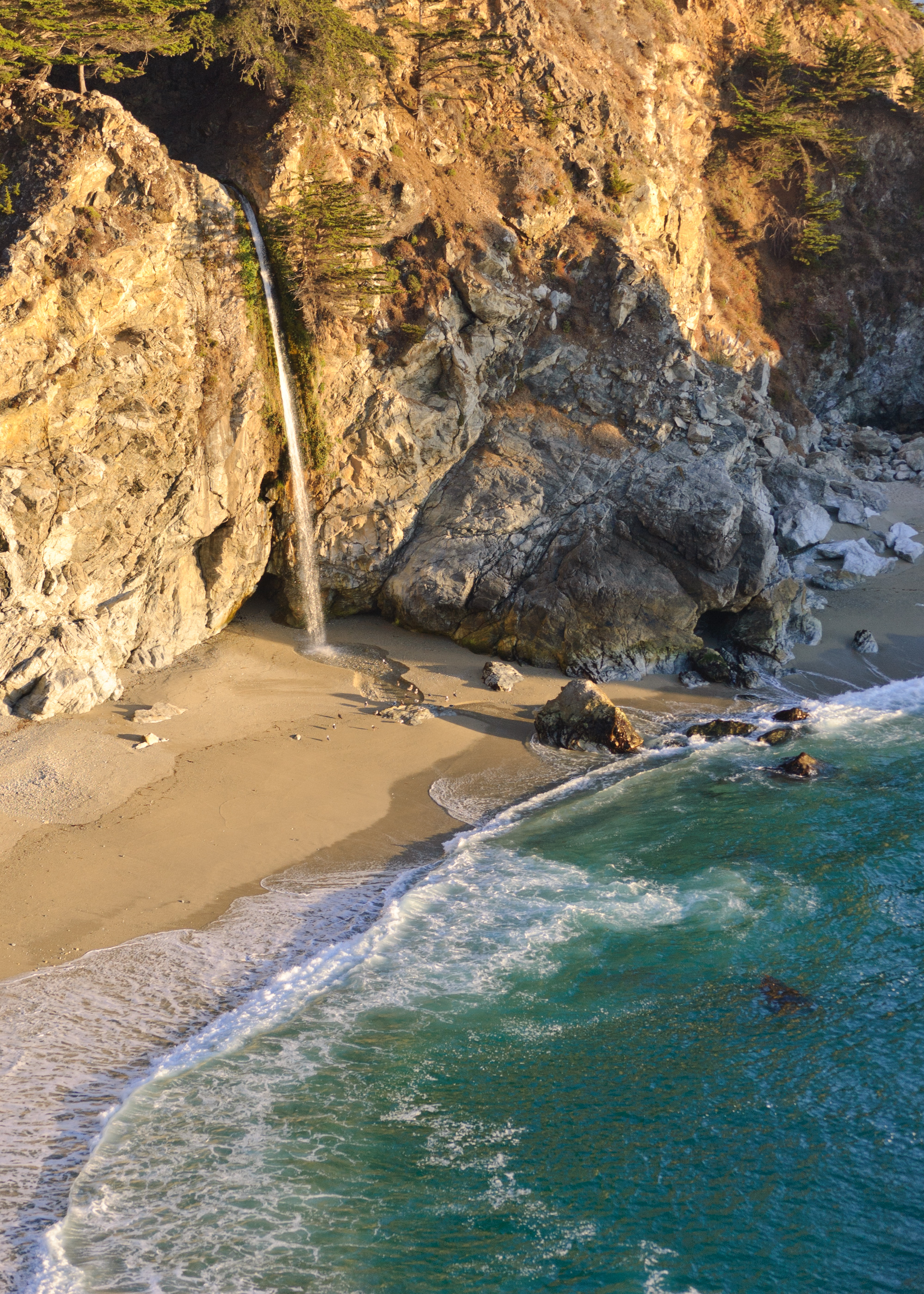
- McWay Falls

- Location within California
- Location: Julia Pfeiffer Burns State Park, California, United States
- Coordinates: 36°09′28.1″N 121°40′19.7″W
- Type: Plunge tidefall
- Total height: 80 feet (24 m)
- Number of drops: 1

McWay Falls is an 80-foot-tall (24 m) waterfall on the coast of Big Sur in central California that flows year-round from McWay Creek in Julia Pfeiffer Burns State Park, about 37 miles (60 km) south of Carmel, into the Pacific Ocean. During high tide, it is a tidefall, a waterfall that empties directly into the ocean. The only other tidefall in California is Alamere Falls.

== History ==
=== Saddle Rock Ranch ===
In 1924, wealthy U.S. Congressman Lathrop Brown and his wife Hélène Hooper Brown visited Big Sur. They bought Saddle Rock Ranch, a 1,600-acre (650 ha) property that included a seaside promontory known as Saddle Rock that overlooked Saddle Rock Cove, from pioneer homesteader Christopher McWay. Hélène was a good friend of Julia Pfeiffer Burns until Julia died in 1928. Julia's great-niece Esther Julia Pfeiffer and her husband Hans Ewoldsen were caretakers of the Saddle Rock Ranch for many years.

The Browns first built a rough redwood cabin on a site at the top of the cliffs opposite McWay Falls. They replaced that in 1940 with a modern two-story home named Waterfall House. The entryway was inlaid with an ornamental brass fish, a gold octopus, and a compass rose. The interior was decorated with fine furnishings and classic paintings.

During construction of Carmel San Simeon Highway through Big Sur, Saddle Rock Ranch foreman Hans Ewoldsen worked in the machine shop of the highway construction crew to build a Pelton wheel. He used hand-split redwood from the canyon and other materials he bought. He installed the wheel on McWay Creek in 1932. The undershot wheel ran a 32-volt generator and was the first electric power in the Big Sur area. It supplied power to three residences, a blacksmith shop, and a funicular railway.

=== Donated to state ===
Lathrop and Hélène Brown left Big Sur for Florida in 1956, where Lathrop died in 1959. In 1961, Hélène Hooper Brown donated the entire property to the state, stipulating that it be used as a park and named for her good friend, Julia Pfeiffer Burns, "a true pioneer". She included the requirement that Waterfall House be converted into a "museum for the custody and display of indigenous Indian relics, flora and fauna of the California coastal area, and historical objects pertaining to the Big Sur country", or otherwise demolished. The museum could not be completed in time for several reasons, including competing museums, shortage of funds, and poor access to the site, and the mansion was demolished in 1965. An overlook of McWay Falls was later built on the site of the former home.

== Topography ==
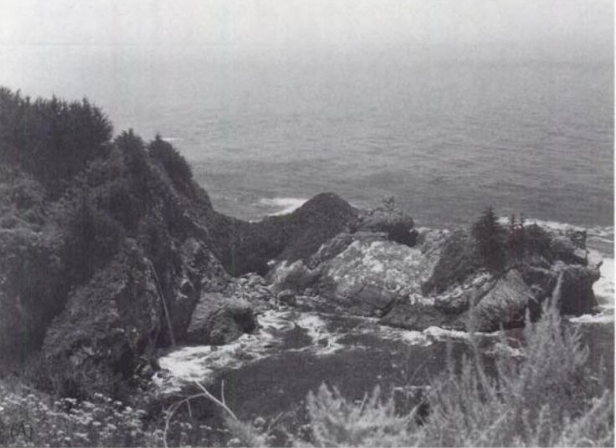
McWay Falls (circa 1963) falling directly into the ocean before mudslides and debris caused a beach to form

In 1983, Big Sur experienced one of the wettest years on record with 88.85 inches (2,257 mm) of rain. Up to this time, McWay Falls fell directly into the ocean. The huge rainfall resulted in several landslides and mudflows, including an extremely large mudslide immediately north of Julia Pfeiffer Burns State Park on March 1. The mudflow entered the ocean immediately to the north of the falls, and Highway 1 was closed for a year while the road was repaired. Reconstruction deposited nearly 3,000,000 cubic yards (2,300,000 cubic metres) of landslide material on the coast, at the base of the slope. Wave action then transported some of the debris south to McWay Cove, forming a sandy beach beneath the falls where none had previously existed. Loose material from the slope beneath the road is still contributing sand to the coastal system. McWay Falls now meets the ocean only when the tide is in, but over time, the beach may wear away so that the falls drop directly into the ocean again.

== Current use ==
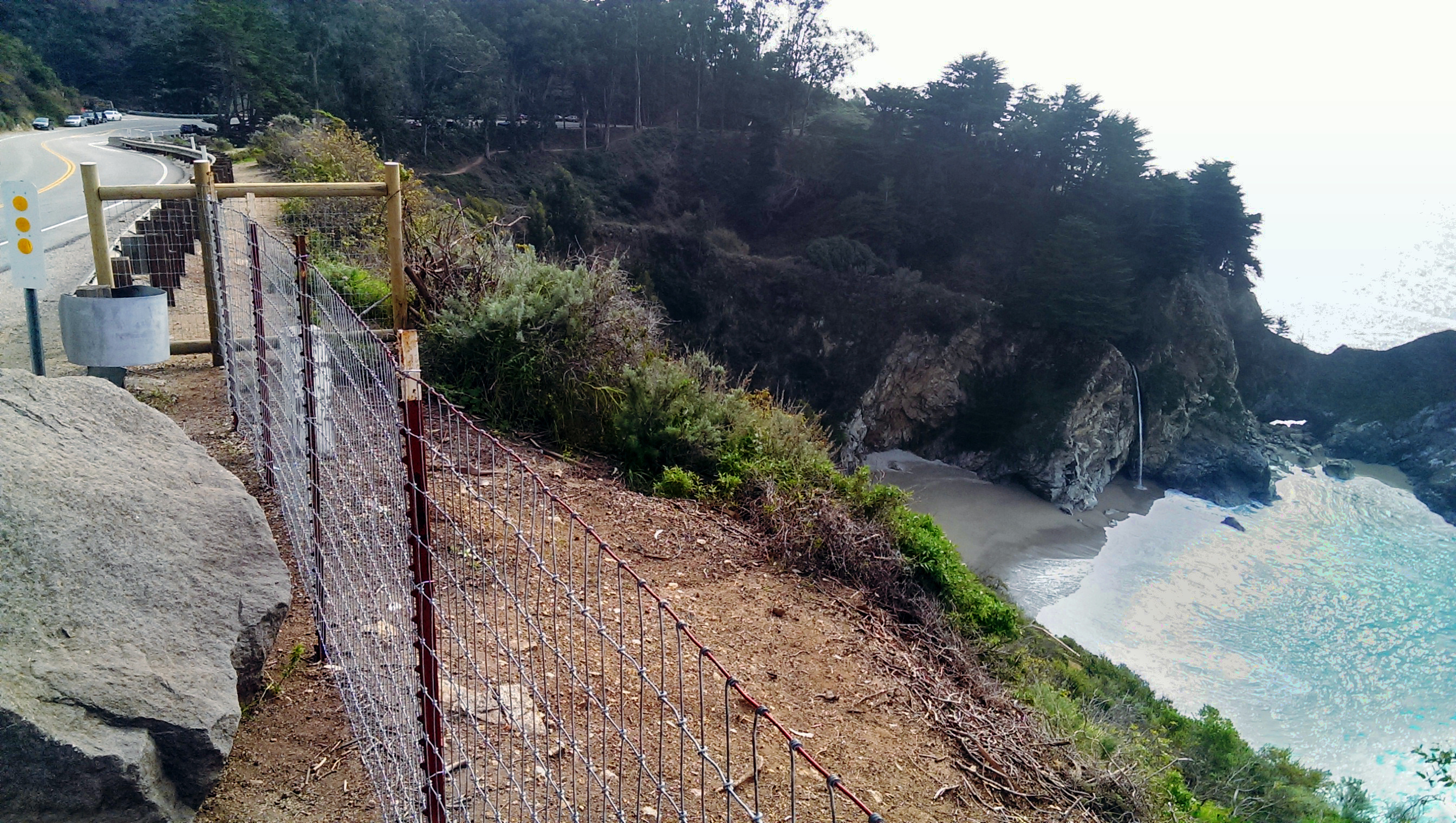
Falls from the Pacific Coast Highway

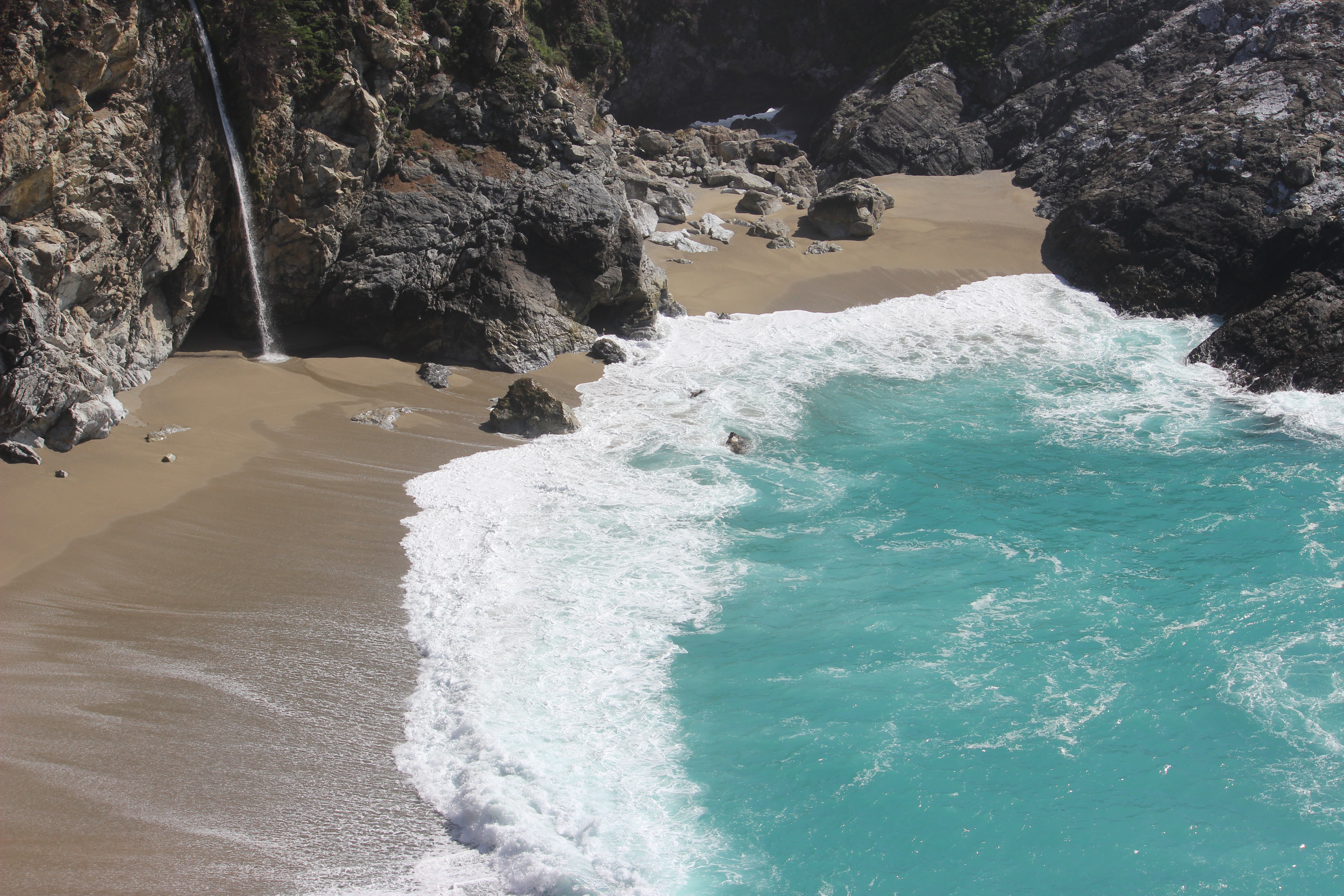
Falls and beach

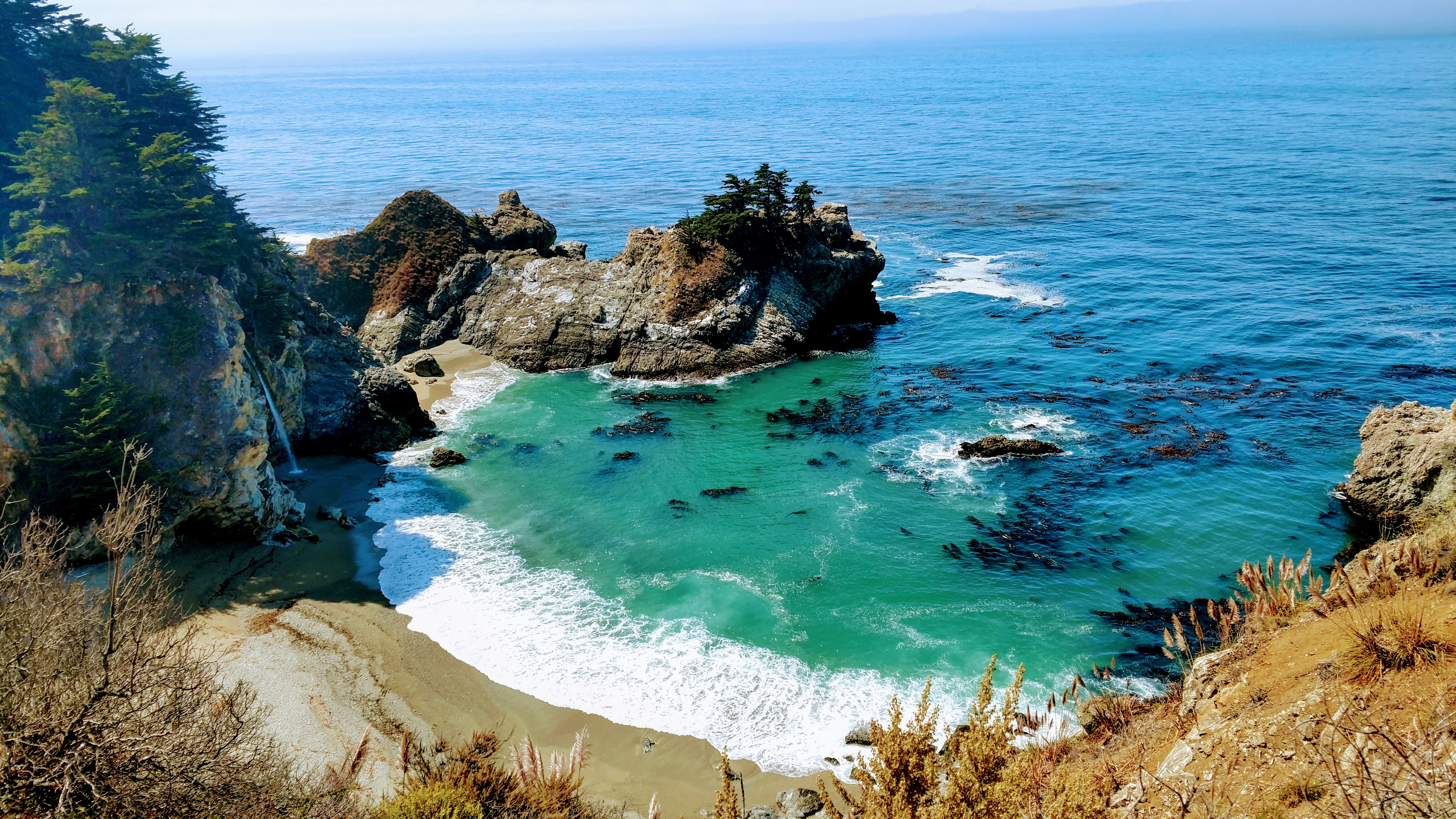
View of falls from the trail

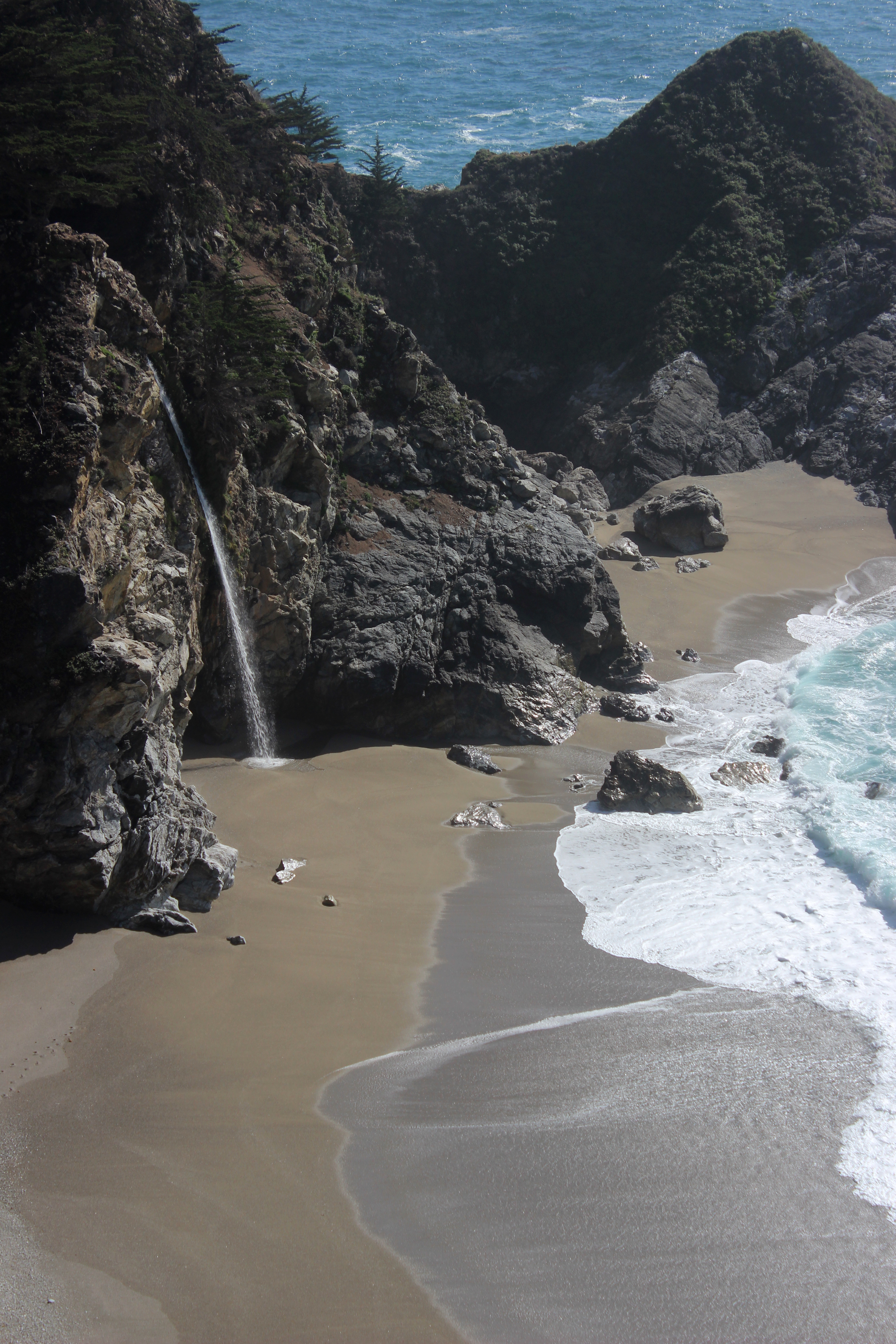
View of the falls

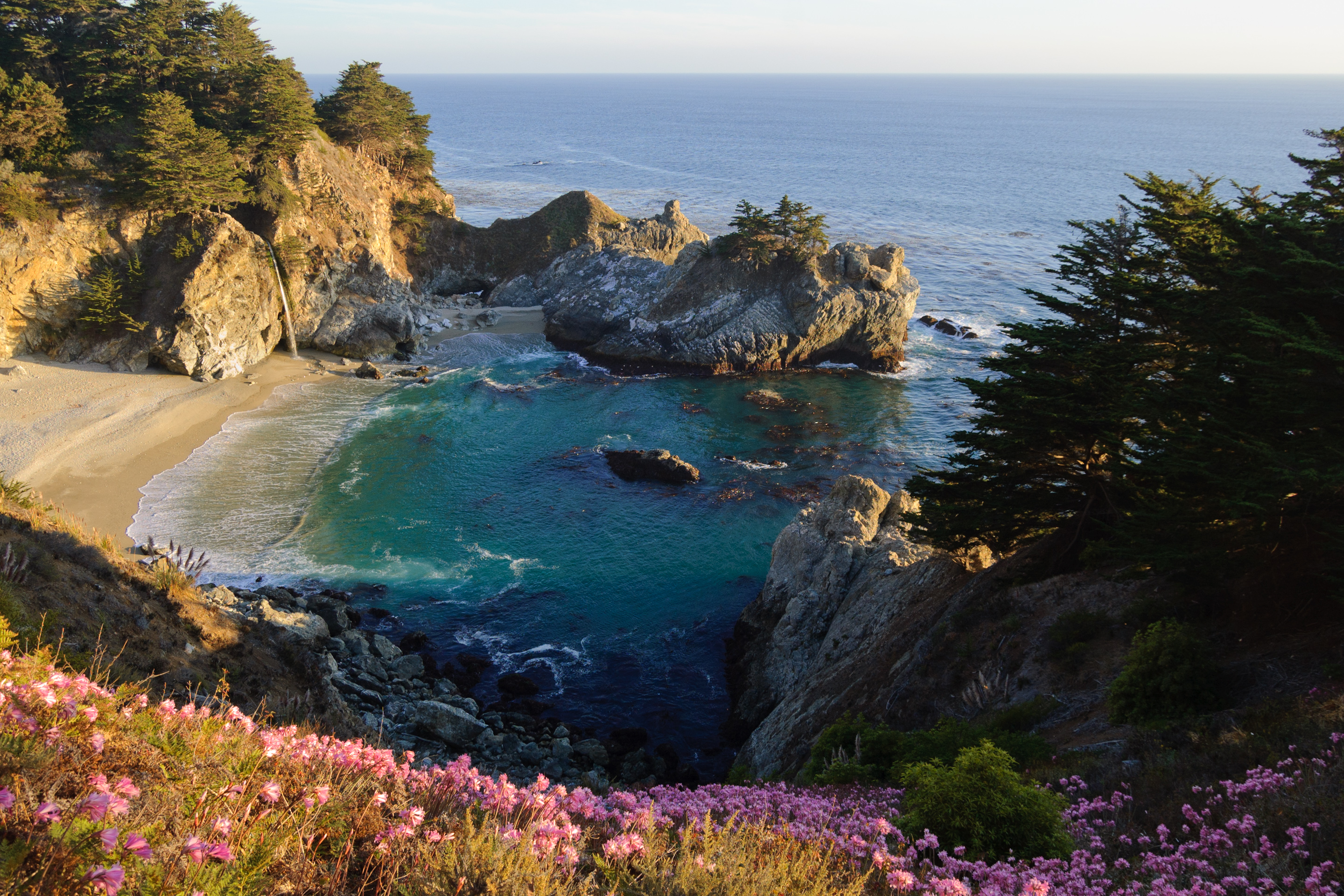
View of the cove

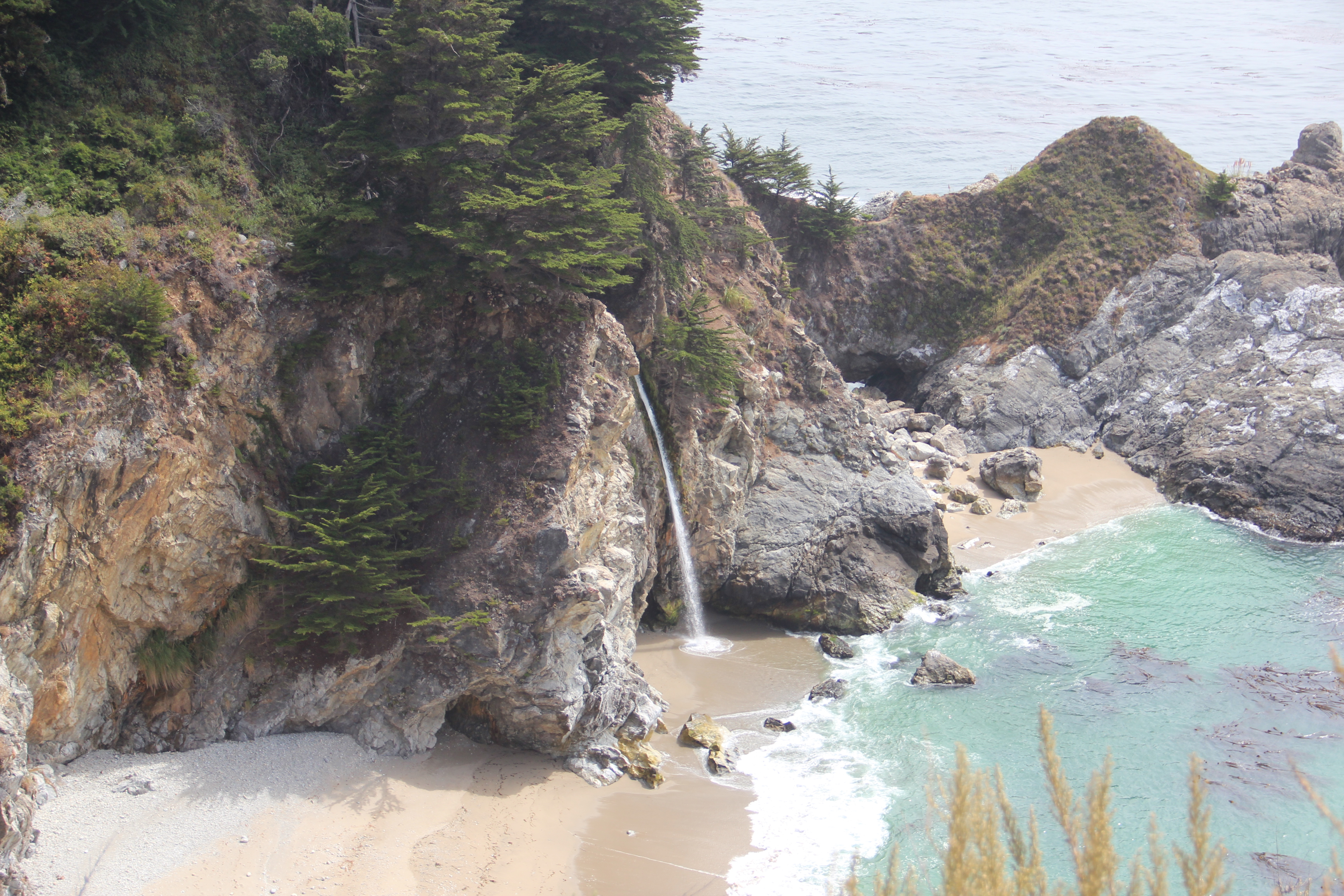
View of the falls

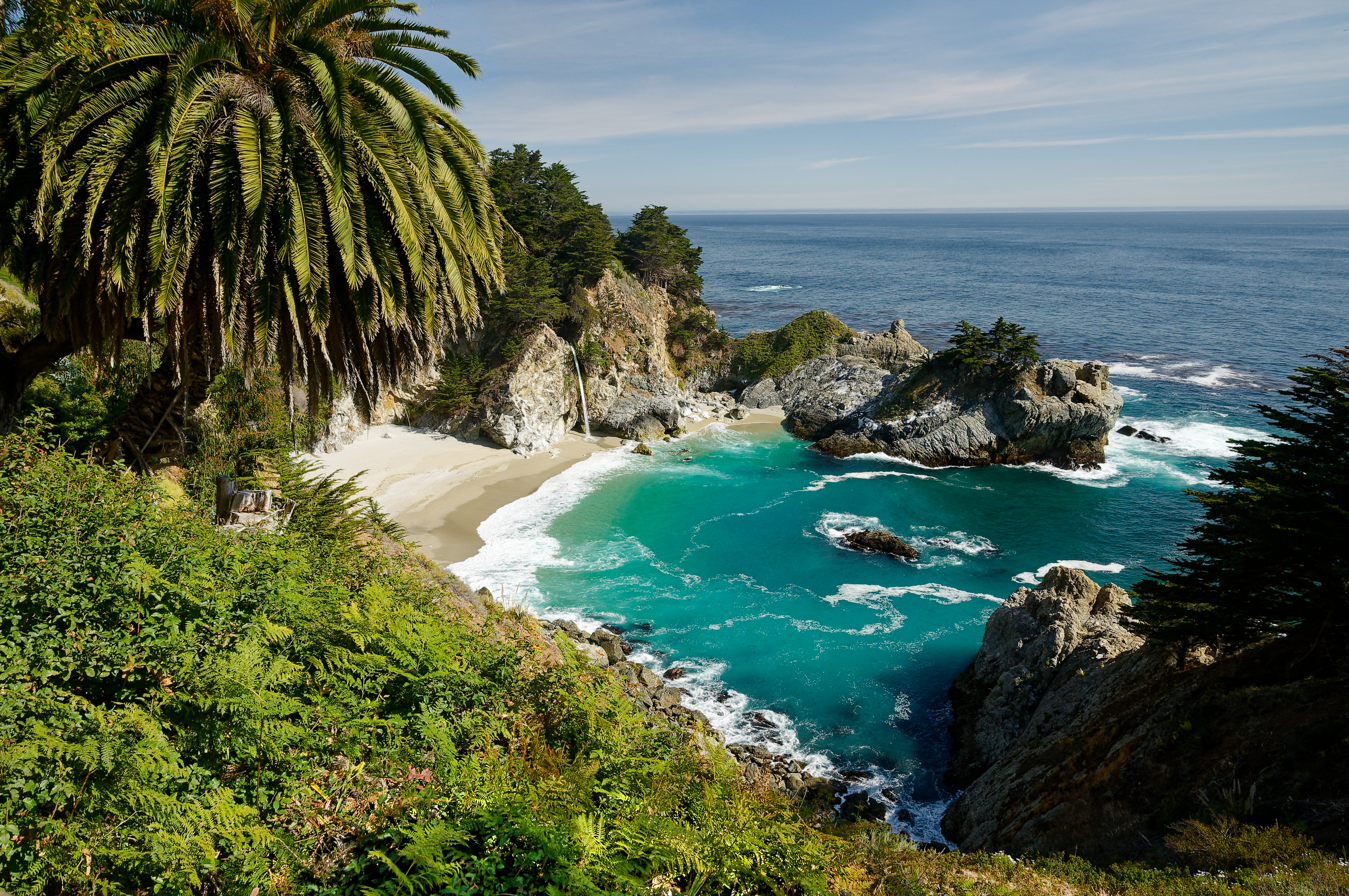
View of McWay Cove, with the McWay Falls, from the trail

Due to the high cliffs surrounding the cove, the beach is inaccessible except by boat, and may be covered by surf at high tide. The outlet of McWay Creek at the top of McWay Falls is accessible by a 0.5-mile-long (0.80 km) trail that starts at a parking area just east of Highway 1. From the parking lot, visitors can walk down a dirt path toward the ocean, through a short tunnel under the highway to the overlook. The Waterfall Overlook of McWay Falls was built on the site formerly occupied by the Browns' mansion. Visitors to the site today can view remnants of the home's foundation, landscaping (including palm trees), and the funicular railway. Ewoldsen's original Pelton wheel is displayed in a small building.

== See also ==
- List of waterfalls
- List of waterfalls in California
