= Tool use by sea otters =

Food-production techniques of Pacific Ocean marine mammal

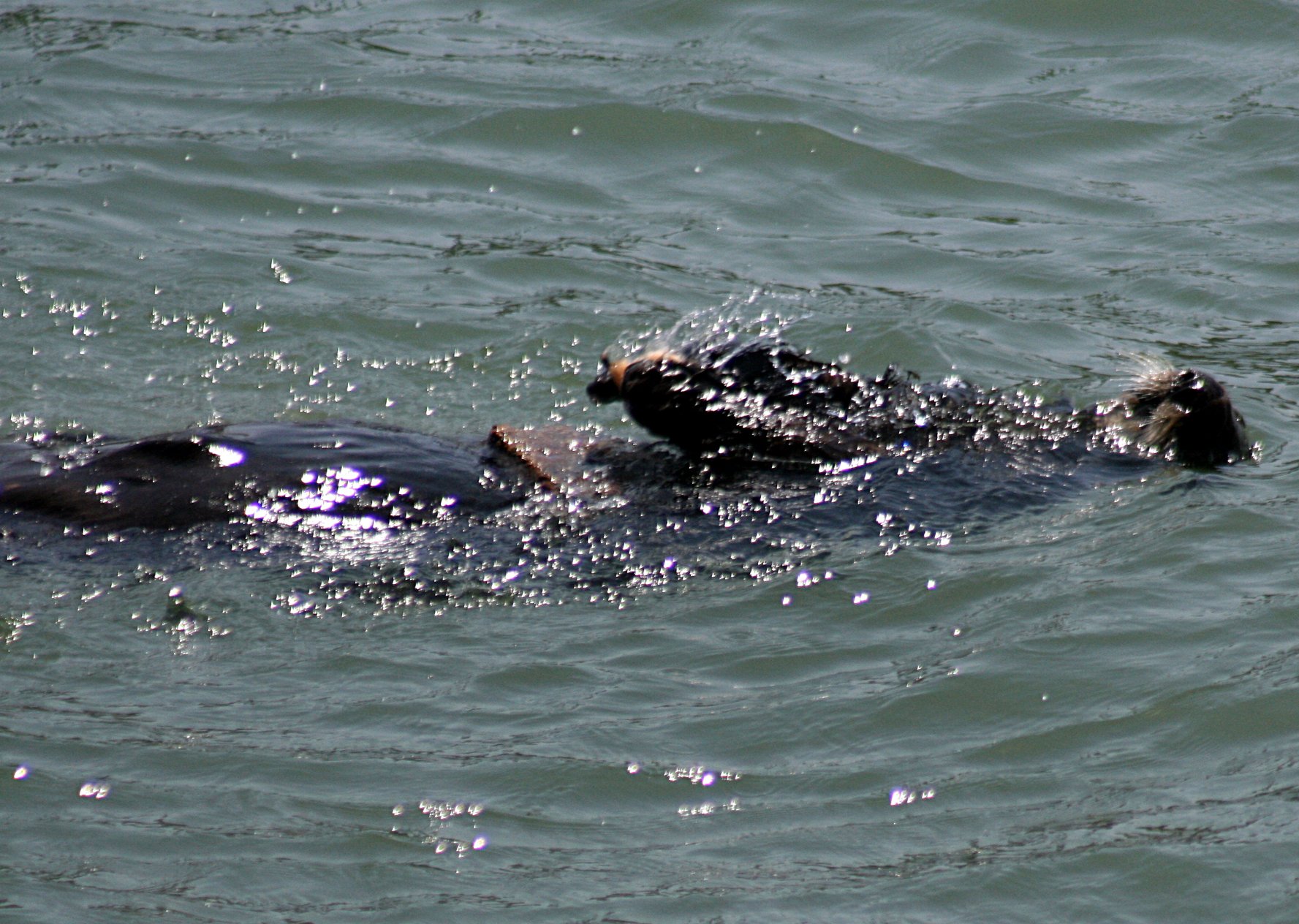
A sea otter using a rock to break open a shell

The sea otter, Enhydra lutris, is a member of the Mustelidae that is fully aquatic. Sea otters are the smallest of the marine mammals, but they are also the most dexterous. Although sea otter tool use is most associated with their use of stones as anvils and hammers, they have been observed using a wide array of other objects as tools, including empty shells, driftwood, and discarded cans or bottles. Sea otters also use kelp or seaweed as an anchor to buoy themselves or to immobilize prey such as crabs. Some sea otters will even improvise techniques, such as ripping off the claws of crabs and using them to pry open the crab's own shell.

Sea otters have demonstrated the capacity for social learning, with knowledge passed down both vertically from mom to pup and horizontally within groups. The frequency of tool use varies greatly between geographic regions and individual otters and depends heavily on maternal transmission. Regardless of the frequency, the use of tools is present in the behavioral repertoire of sea otters and is performed when most appropriate to the situation. This flexibility in whether or not sea otters use tools and in the types of tools they use further emphasizes the importance of learning.

Sea otters are one of only three species, along with humans and bottlenose dolphins, among which individual-level specialization in tool use is documented. Genomic analyses of sea otters and bottlenose dolphins indicate that the RELN gene, which encodes the reelin protein and modulates synaptic plasticity and long-term potentiation, has been under positive selection among both species. The authors suggest that the maternally and socially transmitted variation in foraging behavior and tool use displayed by both sea otters and bottlenose dolphins might be linked to genetic adaptations for increased memory and learning abilities.

== Evolution of tool use behavior ==
Sea otters are one of five species, and the only non-primate, known to regularly use percussive stone-tool technology in the wild. The others are humans, chimpanzees, the bearded capuchin, and the long-tailed macaque.

It is not possible to pin-point when sea otters began using tools consistently. It is hypothesized that certain behaviors were selected for, in the process of evolution, which led to this adaptation. The first instance of a rock as a tool may have occurred when an otter was unable to access a prey item at the bottom of the ocean and used a rock to facilitate access to the object. Similarly, an otter at the surface of the water may have chosen to crush two bivalves against each other when faced with an inability to crush the prey items with the forelimbs or teeth. Shellfish are found on rock structures at the bottom of the ocean, so collecting multiple rocks and shellfish from the bottom of the ocean in one diving episode and crushing the objects together on the surface may have led to the association of rocks with crushing shells of foods items. If a behavior which was performed in a conflict situation happened to open a prey item, an otter may have attempted to repeat the behavior and therefore learned to repeat the behavior consistently.

Sea otters commonly exhibit swimming behavior where they swim on their backs. The features which facilitate swimming on the back also facilitate tool use. Otters that do not use tools still feed on their backs. This habit of feeding on the surface with the chest up facilitates a flat surface for resting rocks and pounding items together (1). Once discovered and consistently performed by one or some otters, the tool use behavior may have spread through a population of nearby otters by horizontal social learning.

Tool use behaviors are observed in mammalian species where adults and their progeny have close ties. Mother otters have one pup at a time and sea otter pups are dependent on their mothers for an average of 6 to 7 months. Extremely young pups cannot swim or dive due to their natal fur coating, so they must be anchored to the mothers at all times. Otter pups therefore receive undivided attention from their mothers for prolonged periods of time.

Similarly, young otters are observed to be exceptionally active, curious, and playful. Selection may have favored certain kinds of manipulatory play. Sea otter pups are adept pickpockets when reared by humans, and have been compared to monkeys in their predilection for mischief.

=== Skeletal changes ===
Sea otters belong to the order Carnivora, whose members possess typical carnivoran teeth, or shearing carnassials. These are blade-like teeth formed by an upper premolar and lower molar. Sea otters have replaced their carnassial teeth with bunodont post-canines to improve their food crushing ability. These teeth favor a diet of aquatic invertebrates which is crucial to the otter's survival in the water.

Sea otters also belong to the family Mustelidae. When compared with other mustelids, such as the river otter, weasels, and minks, the sea otter shows distinct hindlimb anatomy which could contribute to propulsion and stability at the surface of the water while the forelimbs manipulate tools and food. E. lutris has significantly larger gluteus muscles than other mustelids.

Sea otter forelimbs are small and not used in swimming. Forelimb structure, particularly musculature and skeletal anatomy, are potentially adapted for, "tactile sensitivity and tool use associated with detection, handling, and consumption of prey".

== Anatomy ==
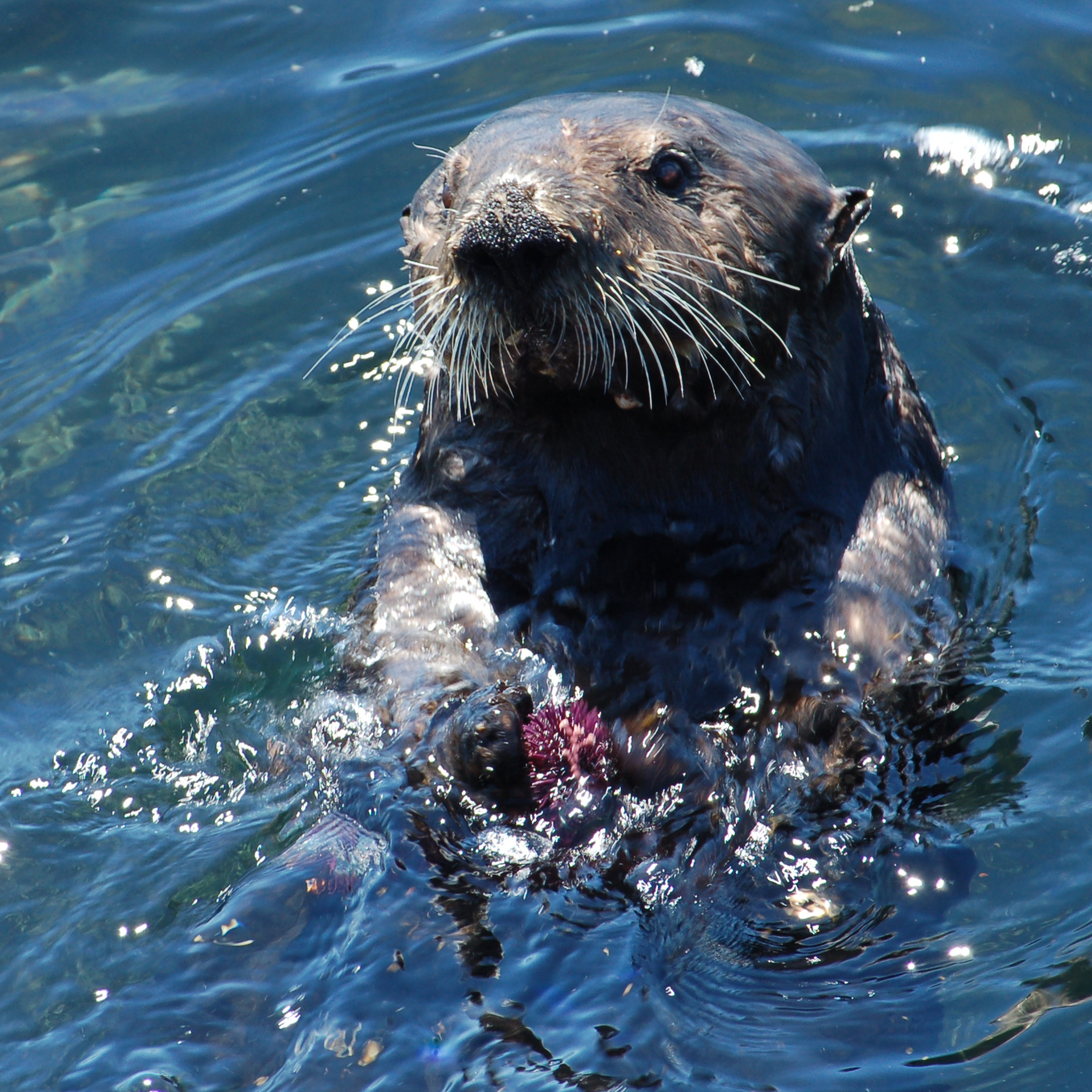
Sea otters have dexterous hands which they use to grasp prey.

The lower incisors of sea otters protrude and are shaped like spades, a shape which may facilitate their ability to scoop food out of shellfish. During consumption of sea urchins, otters use a tool or their paws to crack open the sea urchins and scoop out the gonads and viscera with the lower incisors (12). The canines are blunt, and the post-canines are bunodont. Their flat and broad shape is useful for chewing a combination of soft invertebrates and the harder parts of tougher invertebrates, like shell fragments and sea urchin tests.

Sea otters also have some of the largest lungs in the otter family, which may be helpful for buoyancy, especially because sea otters do not have blubber. Being buoyant along the length of the body allows otters to lie on their backs and manipulate food, tools, and young while on the surface of the water.

Underneath the arm of each sea otter, at the axilla, is a flap of skin that can store stones and food. The hind legs are long and flattened like flippers, and the tail is also flattened. The tail moves in an undulating motion for propulsion. Paws and vibrissae work in tandem to find and grasp prey underwater. Sea otters also have retractile claws on their forelimbs.

== Learning ==
Otters that use stones to open prey do not use stones every time they need to manipulate their prey. Crabs, for example, can be ripped apart by the forelimbs and then eaten. Otters will store a stone in the pouch of skin under the arm to eat prey with both forelimbs, such as crabs, and then retrieve the stone at a later instance. Otters have been observed to use a clam shell as a digging tool and as a pry tool as well. This seems to imply, "an anticipation of use that goes beyond the immediate situation". If a stone appears to be particularly good for opening one food item, it will be kept for several others. In an observation of an otter in Point Lobos State Park, it was seen than one otter ate 44 mussels in one feeding episode and only used six stones. This retention of stone hammers and anvils for later reuse, also documented among chimpanzees, has been cited as indicative of cognitive complexity.

=== Development ===
Sea otter development is marked by a six-month-long dependency period. Once an otter has adult-like swimming and diving behavior, can procure food by itself, and self-groom, it is considered independent. Until then, otter pups spend all of their time with their mothers. This is exacerbated by the fact that for the first three months of life, otter pups cannot swim or dive effectively. They are born with a natal pelage that differs in color and structure from adult pelage and is incredibly buoyant. This prevents them from submerging their bodies underwater and must be held or anchored to kelp.

Sea otter pups display a propensity for manipulating objects between their paws and regularly pound rocks and little bits of coral against their bodies in a random and curious manner. According to some of the earlier otter behavior biologists, Hall and Schaller, this, "tendency to manipulate and pound is far from stereotyped in its application and seems to prove the basis for learning the use of tools in feeding behavior".

=== Social transmission ===
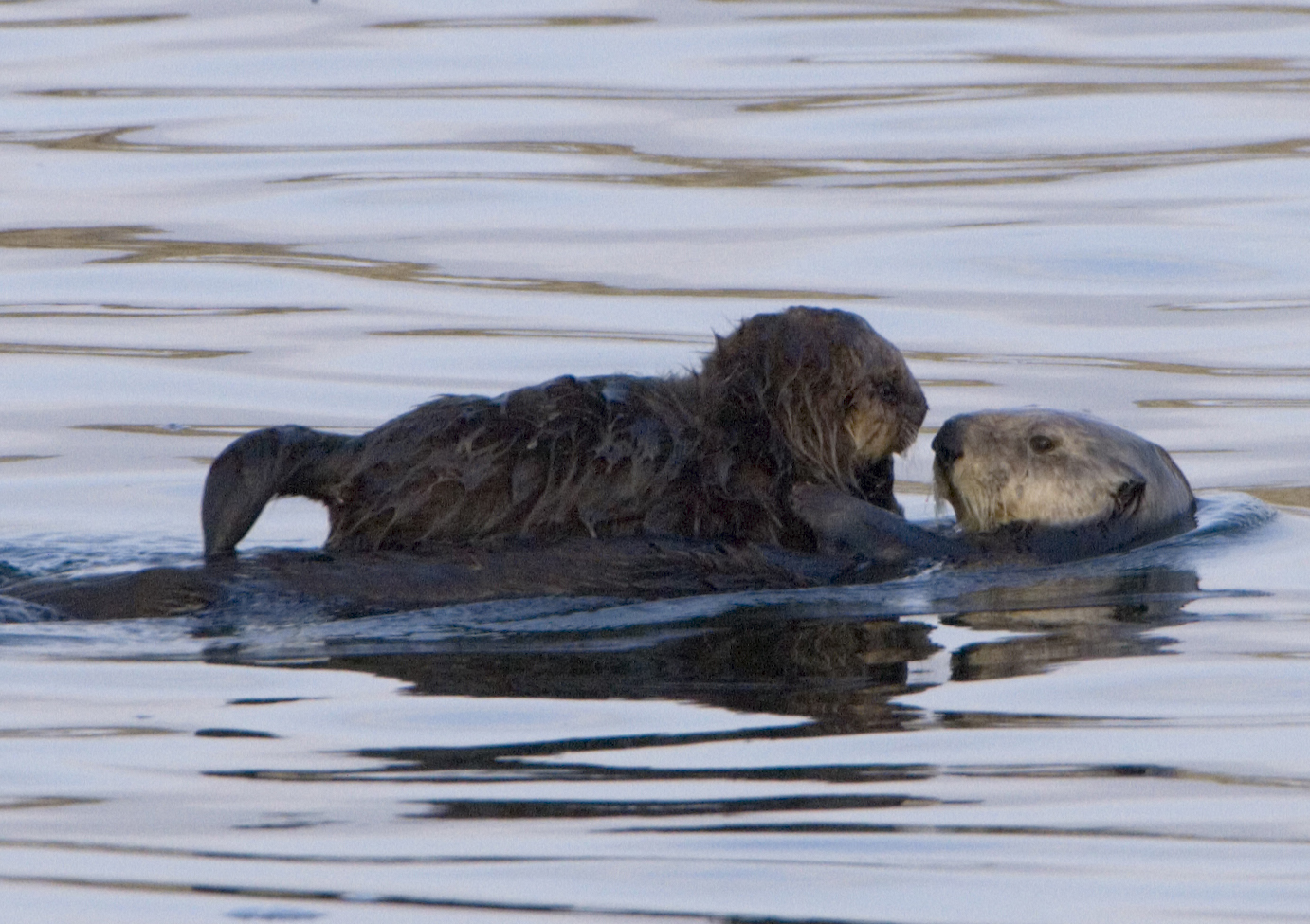
Sea otters, mother and pup

Otters forage independently, except for females with offspring, who feed with their single young. Twins are observed but very rare. This allows for the mother otters to focus their attention on the pup, especially because mating occurs without pair bonding, so the father of the pup is not present. Pups express the same preferences in tools, technique, and diet as their mothers, which is evidence of vertical social transmission. It has been observed that if a pup has not been taught by its mom to use tools by three years of age, it will never use tools as an adult. In addition, pups that are taught to use tools spend years refining their techniques.

Mother otters appear to make sacrifices in order to help their pups. In Prince William Sound it was observed that, "the diet of females with pups was often of poor quality because the mothers frequently foraged on prey items that are easily captured by pups". Georg Steller wrote that "their love for their young is so intense that they expose themselves to the most manifest danger of death. When taken away from them, they cry bitterly, like a small child, and grieve so much that, as we have observed from rather authentic cases, after ten to fourteen days they grow as lean as a skeleton, become sick and feeble, and will not leave the shore."

Sea otters show variation in their foraging techniques, with some examples of horizontal transmission within groups as well, such as the sudden spread of smooth lumpfish hunting among Amchitka Island sea otters. Other sea otters will dig trenches up to four feet long to hunt clams.

== Current tool use behaviors ==
The foundation for observation studies of otters was conducted by scientists K. R. L. Hall and George B. Schaller in 1964. The scientists spent six days observing the Californian otters in Point Lobos State Park, California. Over the course of their time, they observed 30 separate instances of tool use behaviors, most of which involved otters using rocks to crack mussels. Since then, Californian sea otters have been studied extensively for their tool use behavior, garnering more attention to the subject, and serving as a model for what kinds of tool use behaviors the sea otter species is capable of performing.

Sea otters do not seem to express preference for stones and rocks of a particular shape (smooth, sharp, flat, irregular), instead choosing ones that fall between a size range of 6–15 cm (2.4–5.9 in), suggesting that size is more important than shape.

Otters go on dives with their tools stored in specialized pouches of skin underneath the arms. A sea otter may capture more than two different food items on a single dive.

=== Diet ===
In all populations of sea otters, soft-bodied organisms such as worms and sea stars are the least likely to be consumed with the aid of tools. On the other hand, shelled bivalves and snails with shells are the most likely to be cracked open with tools. Otters of the Northern Pacific consume mostly sea urchins and fish, thereby exhibiting less tool use behavior. Otters of the southern Pacific Ocean feed on tougher macro invertebrates such as bivalves.

In central California, sea otters feed mostly on sea urchins, abalones, and rock crabs. Rocks are used to knock abalones from the structure on which they are growing. Rocks can also be used to crack crab carapaces. Scientists have studied areas of California where up to 80% of abalone shells display crack patterns that are suggestive of breakage against rocks performed by otters. In areas near the Aleutian Islands, less tool use is recorded and sea otters consume much more fish. The diet in these areas also includes sea urchins, which otters can break with their forepaws, mollusks, and crustaceans.

=== Methods of tool use ===
Sea otters demonstrate at least three distinct methods of tool use. Two pertain to the use of stones and one pertains to the use of kelp as an anchor. Stones can be used as anvils, in which they are rested on the chest of an otter lying on the ocean surface. Hard prey items can be pounded against the anvil to create cracks and facilitate access to flesh. Stones can also be used as hammers, primarily to extract shellfish from their substrates. Other important aspects of otter tool-use behaviors include the use of tool composites and tool reuse. Tool composite is the term given to the combination of two rocks as an anvil and a hammer, separately, but used on the same prey item at once. Tool reuse is demonstrated by the use of the same stone in a variety of feeding opportunities over one large feeding period.

There have also been observed instances of tool use methods which do not involve stone or kelp, but rather parts of the prey itself. These have been specifically seen as otters taking pieces of shell or crab carapace. Otters will take advantage of nearby objects, occasionally using, "empty shells, driftwood, empty glass, or other discarded man made objects. Live clams are also pounded against each other".

==== Stones as anvils ====
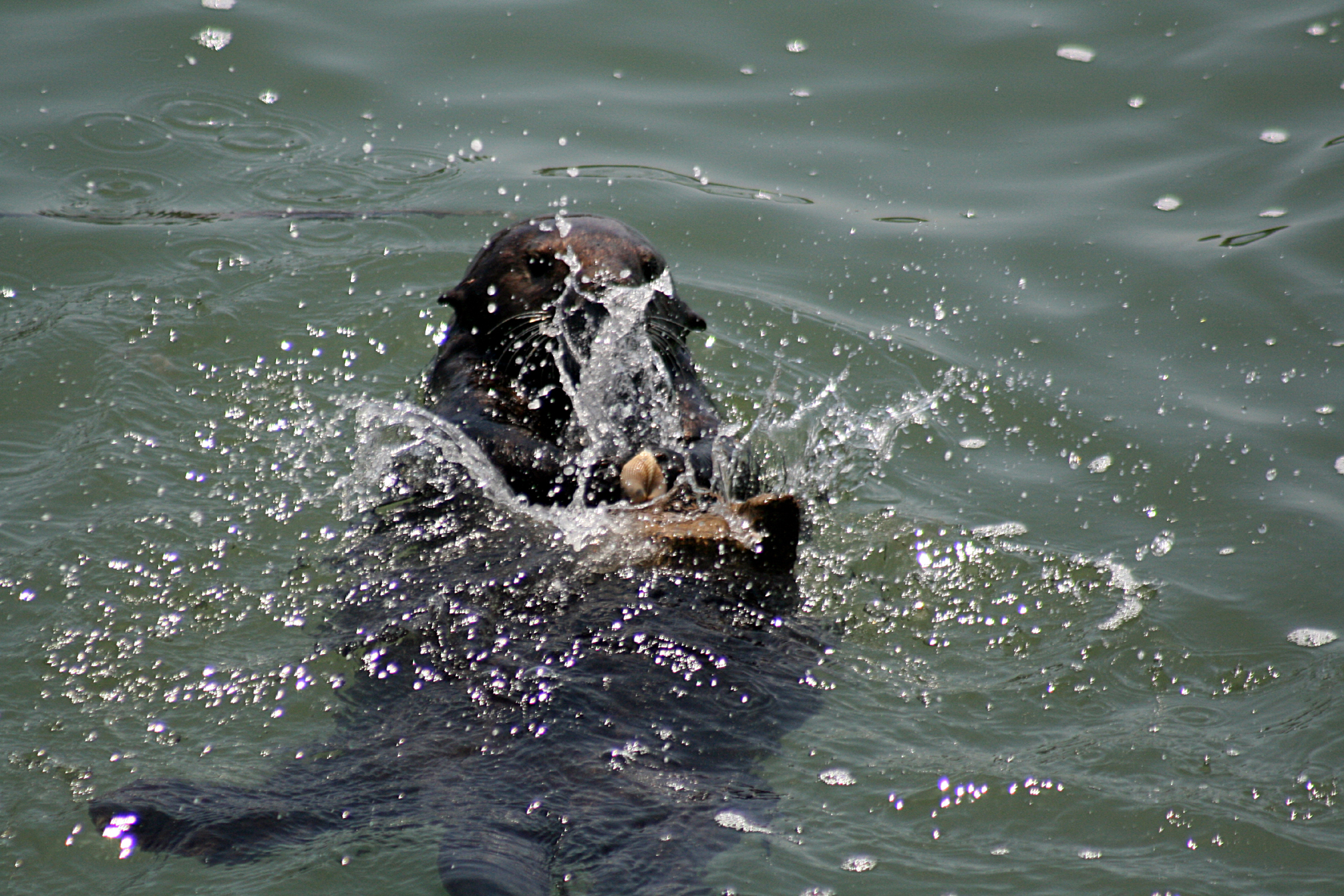
Sea otter using a rock as an anvil for opening a shell

Sea otters most commonly use stones as anvils. They do not express a preference for the shape of the stone or rock, but they do choose fairly large stones, between 6 and 15 cm (2.4 and 5.9 in), to rest on their chests. While all sub-species of otters use the forelimbs to rip open urchins, the Californian otters were observed to have used rocks as a surface to pound urchins and crabs, as well as mussels (observed most frequently). Otters seem to rise from a dive and immediately lie on the surface of the water with their chests up and place a stone on the chest to function as an anvil. The average length of a dive is 55 seconds. Otters hold mussels so as to orient the flat sides of the mussels against the "palms" of the paws and the seam of the two shells contacts the stone in a pounding instance. Mussels are pounded against rock or stones at a rate of two pounds per second. It takes approximately 35 blows to crack open a mussel.

==== Stones as hammers ====
In order to extract abalones from their substrate, otters demonstrate a hammering method by picking up rocks from the bottom of the ocean and hammering the abalone free from the substrate. Once on the surface, the otter may use the anvil method to continue to crack the abalone shell. Otters may also use a stone to hammer a prey item that is rested on the chest.

==== Kelp ====
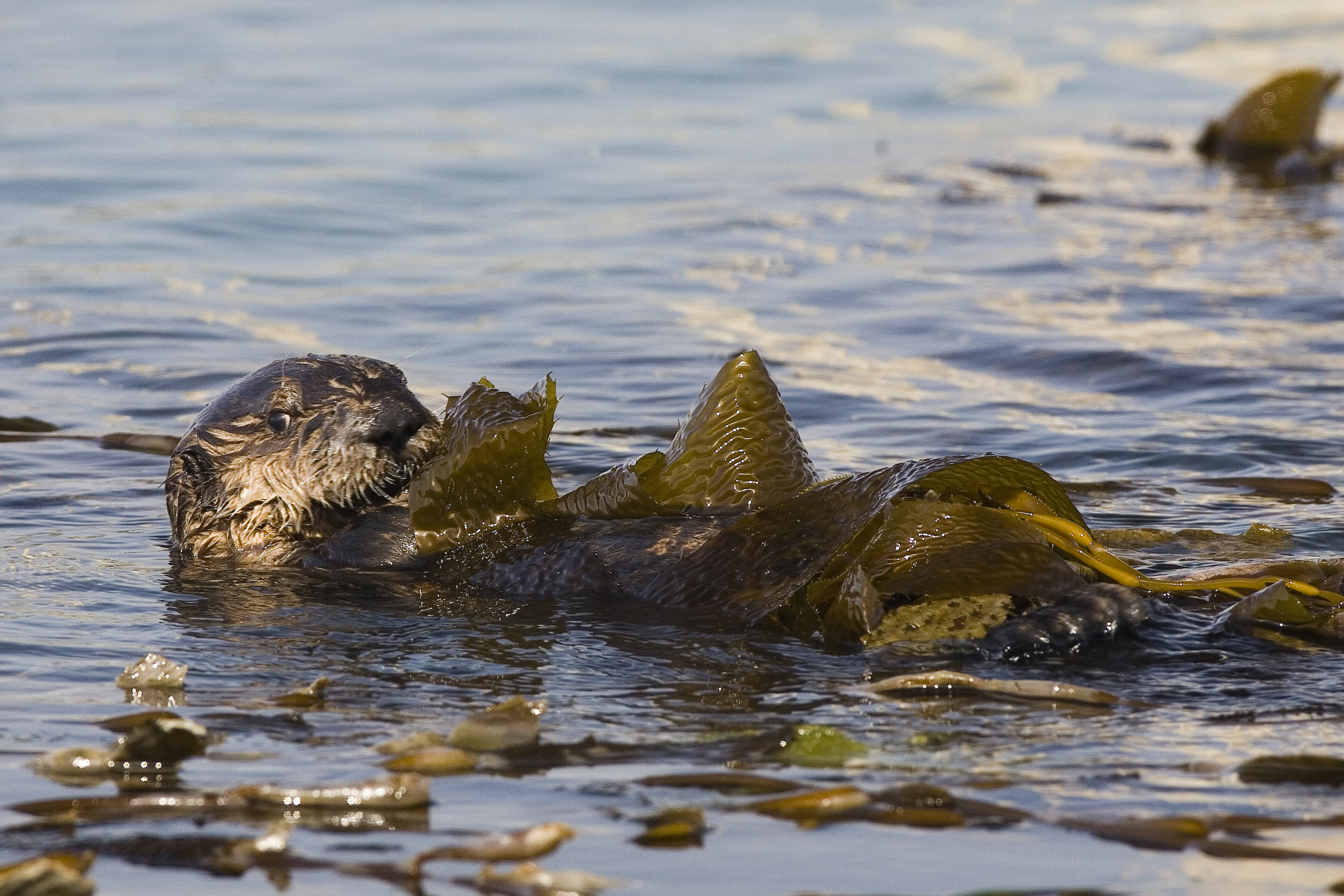
Sea otter in kelp

Otters commonly wrap crabs in strands of kelp to immobilize them and leave the wrapped crabs on the chest while the otter eats other kinds of collected prey from the ocean bottom. Sea otters are familiar with kelp as a wrapping agent because they wrap themselves in kelp to remain in one location at the surface during periods of rest, or during sleeping. Mother otters also wrap their offspring in kelp when they cannot rest the pups on their chests.

In addition to using kelp to buoy themselves, California sea otters have been observed using harbor fenders to prevent themselves from drifting away.

=== Variation ===
==== Intra-species variation ====
Intra-species variation is observed with regards to the Northern Pacific and the Southern Pacific. In Point Lobos, the use of tools to open mussels is very common. This behavior is distinctly less common in northern areas like the Commander Islands and Kuril Islands. There, adult otters only use tools if they are unable to open food items after trying first with their teeth. Alaskan otters do not use tools as often as Californian otters. Californian otters show multiple techniques with differences that are tailored specifically to eating bivalves and crabs.

A study that compiled seventeen years' worth of observational data demonstrated a significant difference between the occurrence of tool use in Amchitka Island, Alaska and Monterey, California. Alaskan otters used tools on 1% of dives, while Californian otters used tools on 16% of dives.

==== Sexual variation ====
All otter pups generally use tools if their mothers did. However, females are more likely to use tools to crush their prey in situations where the prey does not necessarily require a stone. It is suspected that matrilineal transmission can explain the observed female sex bias. Female otters also display more variation in the types of tool-use methods they employ.

==== Individual variation ====
During long-term studies to record behavior, it is frequently recorded that some individual otters do not use tools at all. Instead, these otters target soft-bodied prey like fish, or urchins which can be ripped apart with the forelimbs. Among tool using otters, up to 21% of the day can be spent engaging in tool use. In a study conducted from Alaska to Southern California, sixteen otter populations demonstrated that individual diet specializations are much more likely to be present in environments of rocky habitat over soft sediment substrates. Daughter Californian otters display the same tool techniques as their mothers, expressing explicit preference for certain methods when eating bivalves or eating crabs.

In an aforementioned study, which compiled 17 years of observational data on otters from southern California to the Aleutian Islands, it was discovered that anywhere from 10% to 93% of individuals in a population use tools.

Some otters have developed very specific, individual behaviors that do not necessarily demonstrate tool use, but do demonstrate dexterity. Individuals in California have learned how to tear open aluminum cans that float in the water from incidents of pollution. Small octopuses commonly reside in the cans and the sea otters attempt to eat the small octopuses. Others have learned to reach on the stern of small boats to obtain bait fish or squid.

== Paralytic shellfish poisoning ==
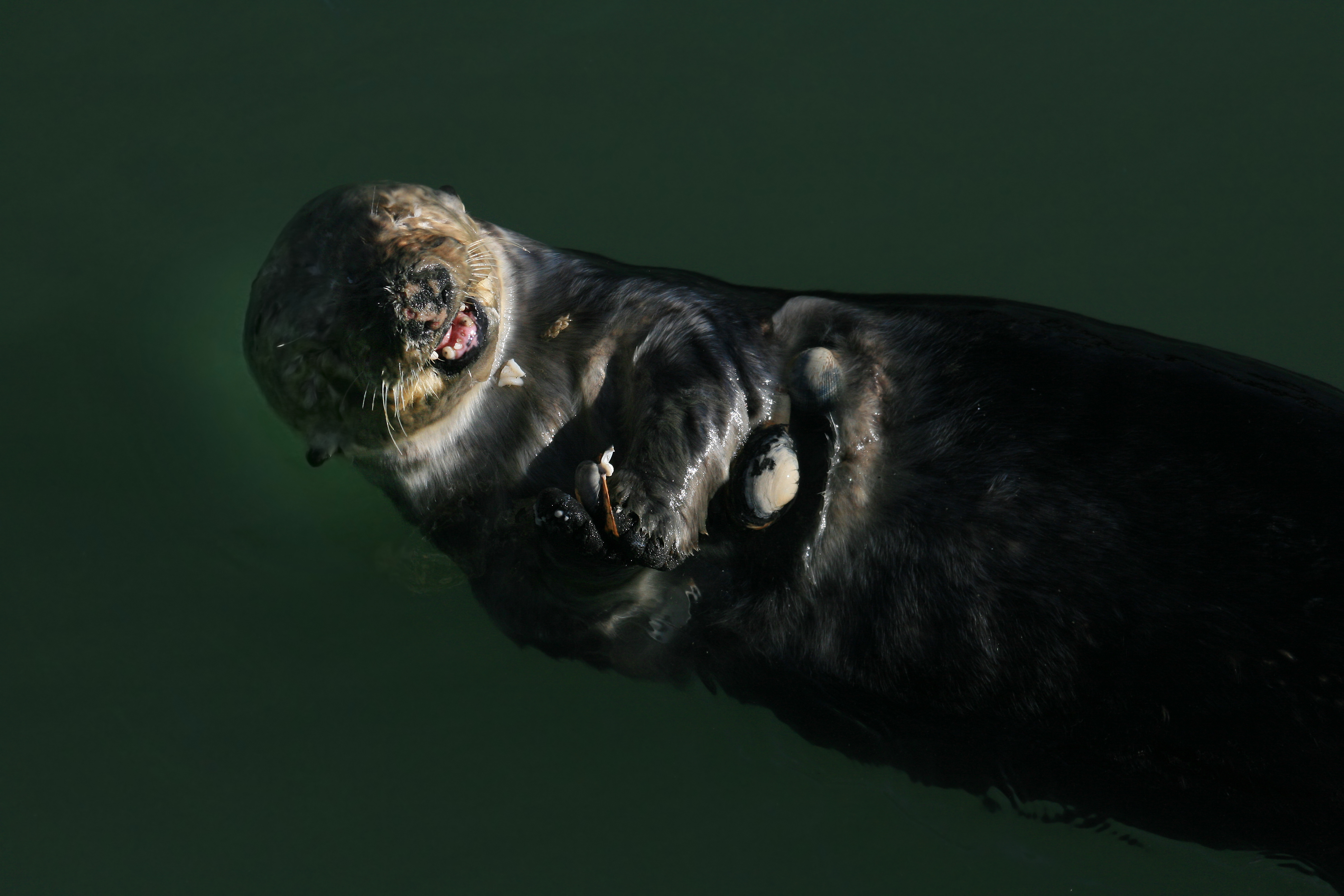
Female sea otter eating clams in Moss Landing, California

Otters are not immune to paralytic shellfish poisoning, despite some popular belief that they are. However, they have the ability to manipulate their prey enough to avoid the paralytic shellfish poisoning toxins so that they do not consume lethal amounts. Alaskan sea otters prey heavily on the butter clam, which has the ability to retain toxins obtained from dinoflagellate blooms. Captive sea otters were fed live butter clams in a study designed to test toxin avoidance and the otters discarded the siphons and kidneys before eating the clams. Most of the toxins are concentrated in these organs.

== See also ==
- Tool use by non-human animals
