= Adaa (sea otter) =

Oldest known male sea otter (1999–2022)

- Species: Sea otter
- Sex: Male
- Born: September 1999
- Died: February 27, 2022 (aged 22)
- Cause of death: Euthanasia
- Residence: Seattle Aquarium; Seattle, Washington

Adaa was a male sea otter at the Seattle Aquarium, known for being the oldest male sea otter on record at 22 years and eight months. Male sea otters in the wild typically live between 10 and 15 years, while females average 15–20 years.

== Early life ==
Adaa was estimated to be seven months old when he was discovered suffering from hypothermia on a remote airport runway in Port Heiden, Alaska. He received emergency care at the Alaska SeaLife Center, where he was named Adaa, an Aleut word meaning "come ashore." He was then transferred to the Oregon Coast Aquarium, where he lived until April 2004, when he was moved to the Seattle Aquarium.

== Appearance, habits and care ==
Adaa was known for his gentle demeanor towards both the female otters and his human handlers. He would hop on his rear flippers while on land and make soft cooing sounds while chewing. His favorite pastimes included crunching on ice and solving puzzle feeders. After the passing of his mate Aniak, he was often seen grooming and holding onto Mishka, Seattle Aquarium's youngest female otter, while he slept.

== Family ==
Adaa sired two pups with Aniak, who was born in captivity in 2002 to Lootas, Seattle Aquarium's oldest otter until her death in November 2020. Lootas, affectionately known as "Grandma," was also rescued in Alaska, and her pups Aniak, Alki, and Yaku became the first sea otters to be successfully born and raised to adulthood in captivity. She was the subject of a children's book, Lootas Little Wave Eater: An Orphaned Sea Otter's Story by Clare Meeker, with the help of Seattle Aquarium.

Adaa and Aniak's first pup, Chugach, a male, was transferred to Pittsburgh Zoo & Aquarium, where he predeceased Adaa. Their second pup, Sekiu, a female, was the eleventh sea otter pup born at Seattle Aquarium and the last one born in captivity before the Association of Zoos and Aquariums discontinued the otter breeding program to focus resources on rescuing stranded pups. Sekiu was born during a snowstorm, and the event attracted many Seattle residents who wanted to get a glimpse of mom Aniak carrying around her new pup.

The aquarium's three generations of otters were highly affectionate with each other. When Lootas returned from a 5-month stay at the Oregon Zoo, she was enthusiastically greeted by Adaa. Adaa was reunited with his daughter Sekiu in December 2021, a few months before his death. Aniak died in June 2021. Sekiu is alive and remains one of Seattle Aquarium's featured otters.

== Death ==
In mid-February 2022, Adaa was diagnosed with terminal cancer. He was so trusting of his human handlers that he allowed them to take X-rays and samples of the fluids that had rounded his abdomen. During his last days, Adaa was treated to his favorite foods, such as Dungeness crab and Atlantic surf clam, in addition to his favorite ice to crunch. Despite being given oral steroids to suppress the cancerous cells, his condition rapidly deteriorated and he was humanely euthanized on February 27.

A children's book about Adaa's rescue and subsequent aquarium life, Adaa’s Story: The Remarkable Life of a Rescued Sea Otter, was written and illustrated by Rachel J.E. Sprague in collaboration with the Seattle Aquarium and Alaska SeaLife Center.
