= Duden (disambiguation) =

The Duden is a dictionary of the German language.

Duden may also refer to:

- Duden (surname)
- "Duden" (song), a song by Natacha Atlas
- Duden Park, a park in Brussels, Belgium
- 26119 Duden, a main-belt asteroid
- Düden River of Anatolia, Turkey
- Düden Waterfalls formed by the Düden River
