= List of waterfalls that empty into an ocean =

This is a list of coastal waterfalls, i.e. waterfalls that debouch into an ocean, grouped by continent.

== Africa ==
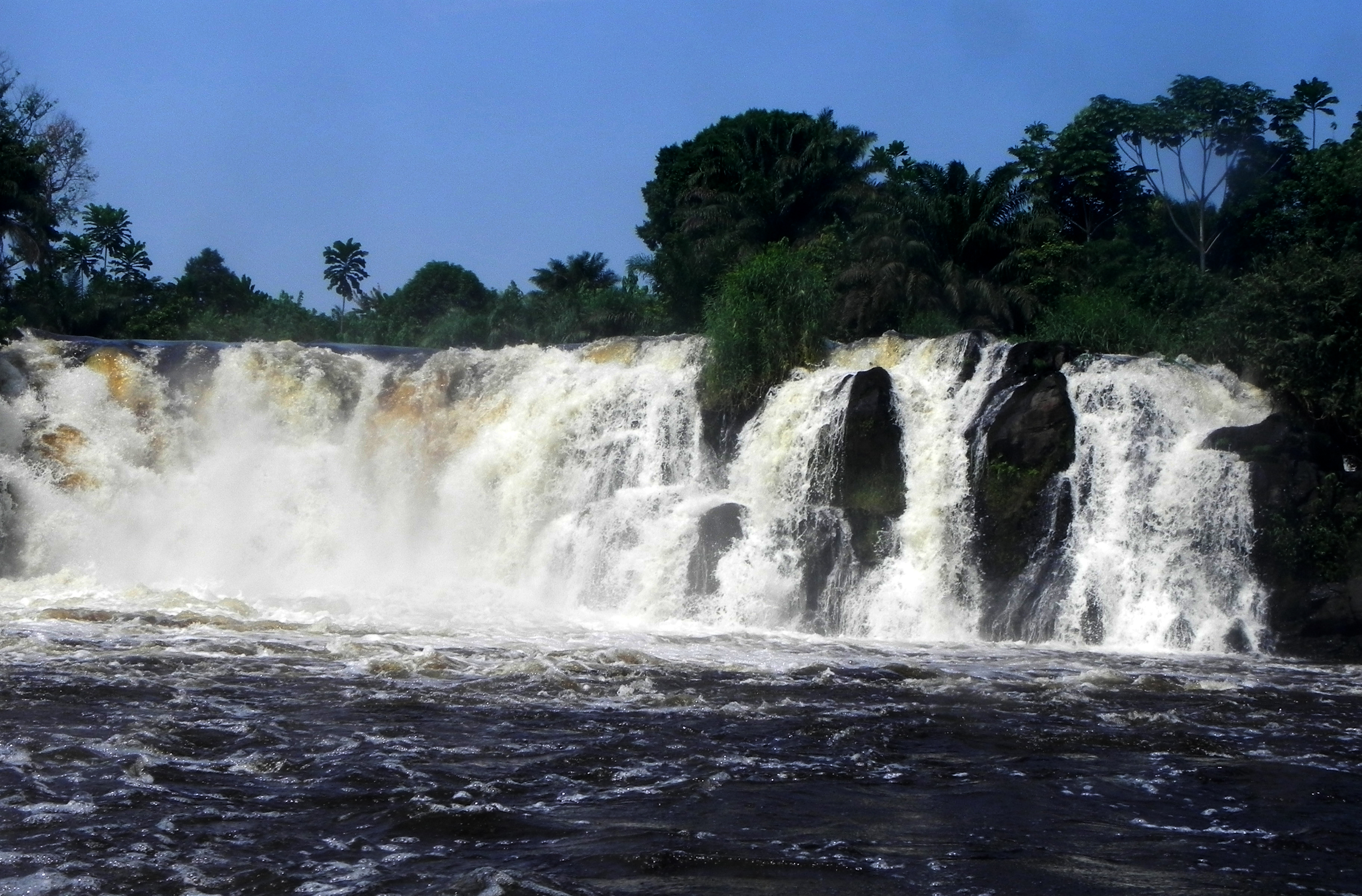
- Lobe waterfall, Cameroon
  Lobé Waterfalls (Kribi, Cameroon)
- Waterfall Bluff (South Africa)
- Secret Falls (South Africa)

== Asia ==
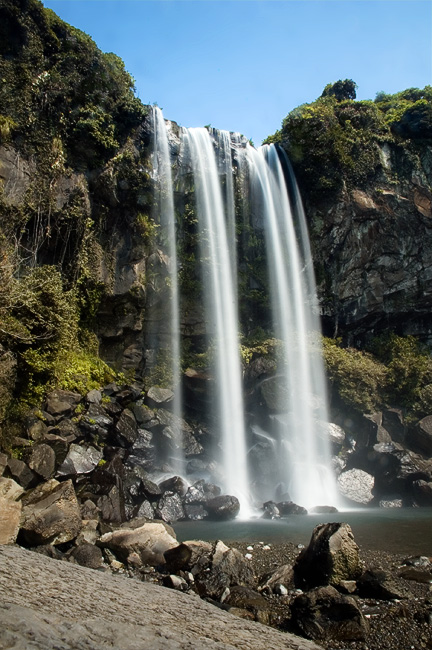
Jeongbang Waterfall in South Korea

- Jeongbang Waterfall (South Korea)
- Tajima Falls (Japan)
- Mursala Island Waterfall (Indonesia)
- Banyutibo Waterfall (Indonesia)
- Alabat Waterfall (Philippines)
- Bisibis Waterfall (Philippines)
- Catandayagan Waterfall (Philippines)
- Pyamaluguan Sabang Waterfall (Philippines)
- Düden Kıyı Şelalesi Waterfall (Antalya, Turkey)

== Europe ==
- Cascada del Ézaro waterfall, Dumbría, Galicia (Spain)
- Cascada de Maro, Maro, Málaga (Spain)

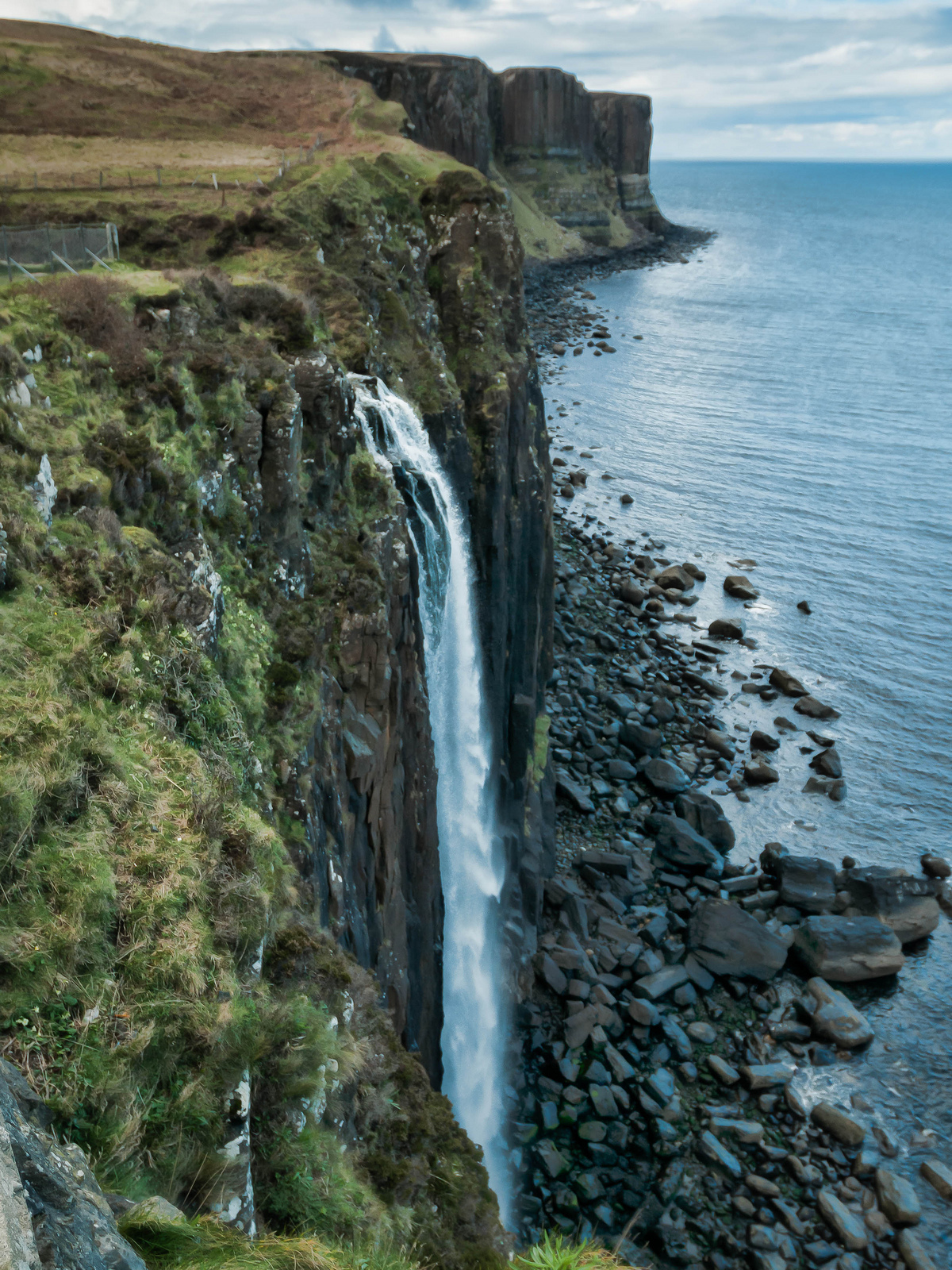
Mealt Falls, Isle of Skye

- Ketubjorg (Skagafjörður, Iceland)
- Mealt Falls (Isle of Skye, Scotland)
- Seven Sisters Waterfall (Geirangerfjord, Norway)
- The Suitor / The Friar (Geirangerfjord, Norway)
- Tresaith waterfall (Wales)
- St Audries waterfall (England)
- Múlafossur waterfall (Faroe Islands)
- Bøsdalafossur (Faroe Islands)
- Skarðsáfossur (Faroe Islands)

== Americas ==
South America

- Saco Bravo (Brazil)

North America

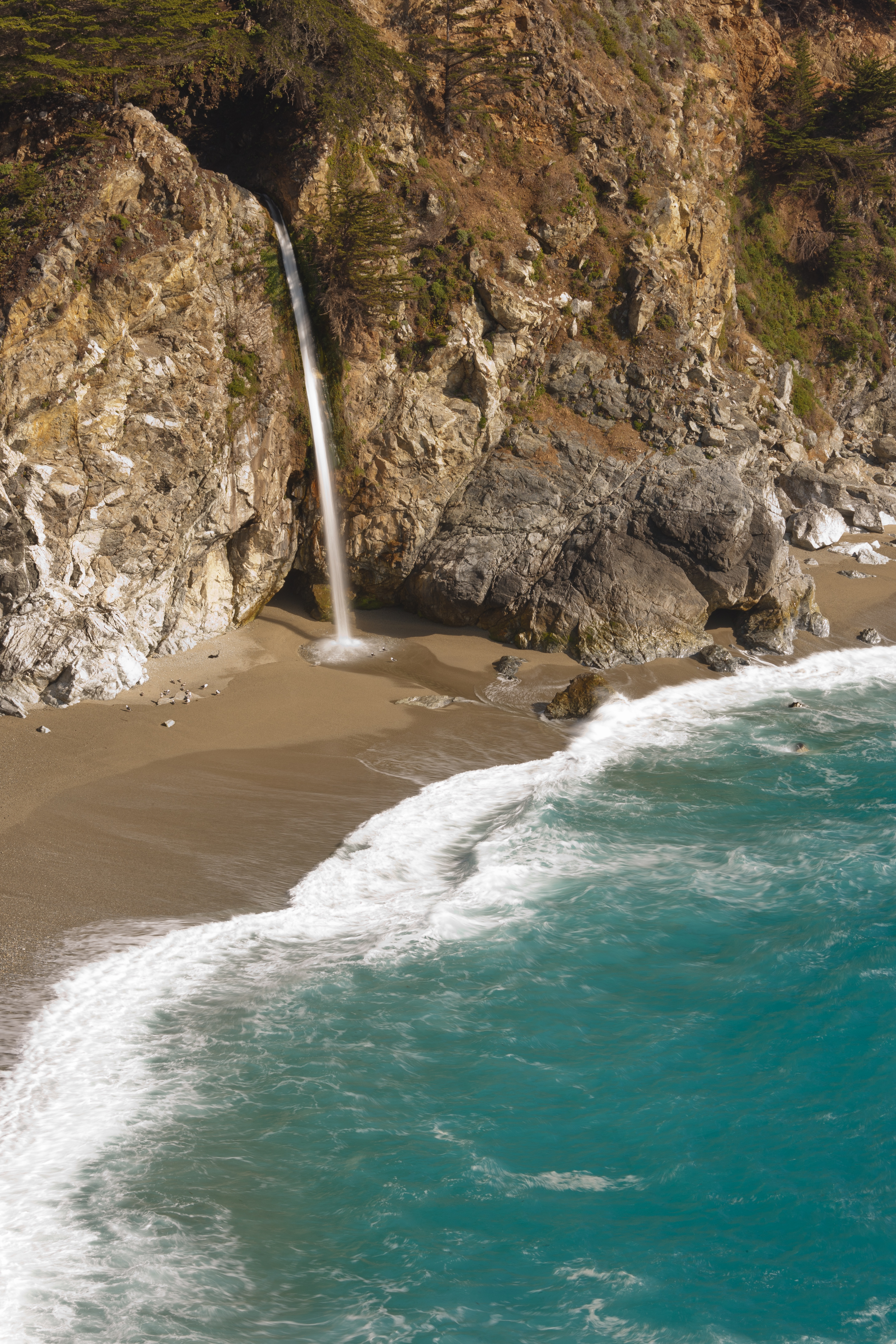
McWay Falls in California

- Strawberry Bay Falls (Washington, USA)
- Alamere Falls (California, USA)
- McWay Falls (California, USA)
- Dunns River Falls (Jamaica)
- Wavine Cyrique (Dominica)
- Baxter Falls (Nova Scotia, Canada)
- Racine Falls, (Toba Inlet, British Columbia, Canada)

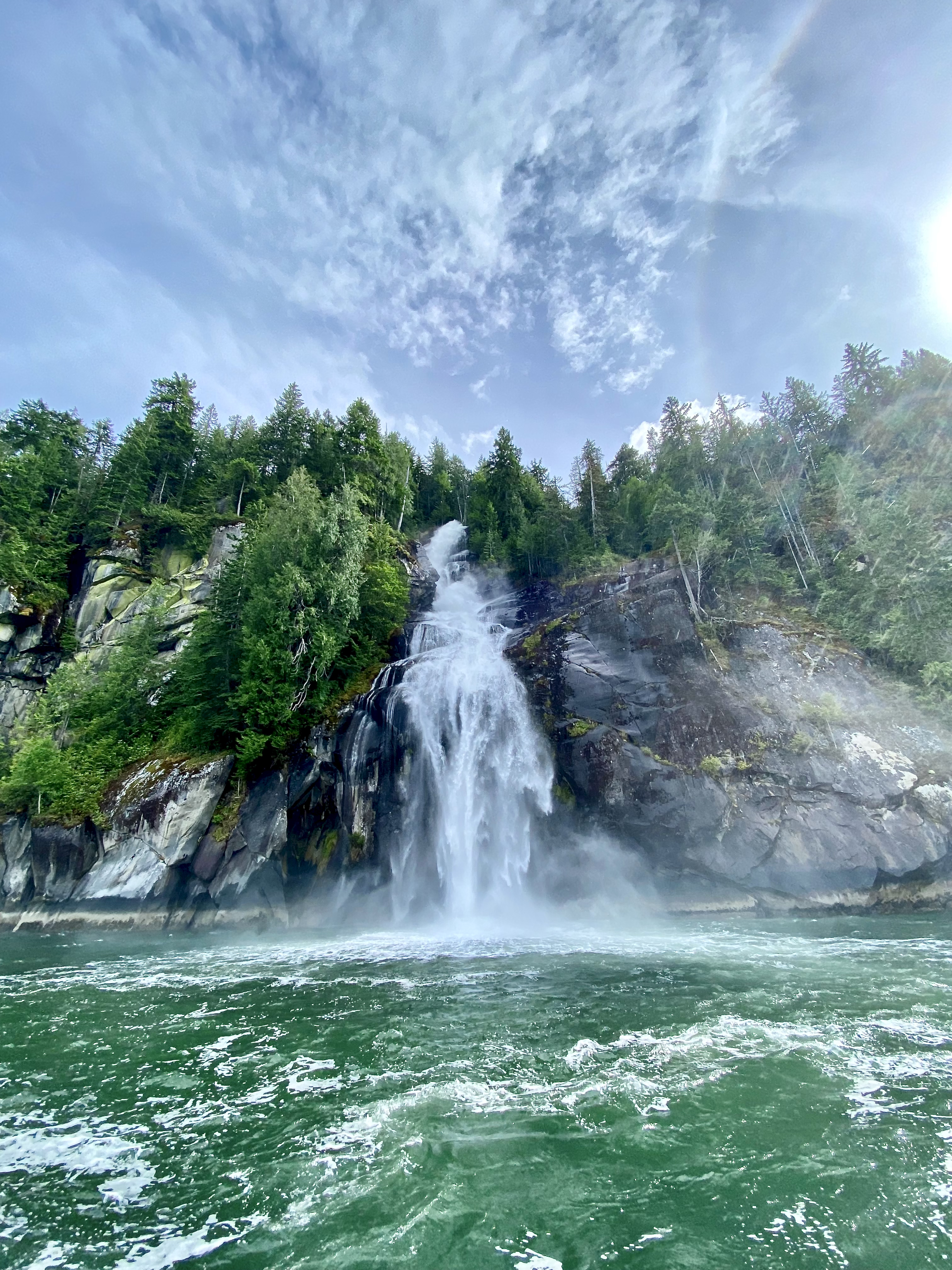
Racine Falls, Toba Inlet, British Columbia, Canada

- Tsusiat Falls, (British Columbia, Canada)
- Playa Cocalito, Cocalito Falls (Tambor, Costa Rica)

== Oceania ==
- Waiulili Falls (Big Island, Hawaii, USA)
- Savulevu Yavonu Waterfall (Taveuni, Fiji)
- Curracurrong Falls (NSW, Australia)
- Waterfall Bay (Tasmania, Australia)
- King George River, (Western Australia)
- New Zealand: the following waterfalls empty into fjords of the Tasman Sea:
  - into Doubtful Sound - Chamberlain Falls, Helena Falls, Lady Alice Falls.
  - into Milford Sound - Bowen Falls, Stirling Falls.
- Samoa: Mu Pagoa Waterfall in the Palauli District on Savaii:
