= Catarrhactes =

Catarrhactes (Ancient Greek: Καταρράκτης) meaning "waterfalls" may refer to:

- Düden River
- Maeander River
