= Coastal waterfall =

Waterfall that plunges directly into the sea

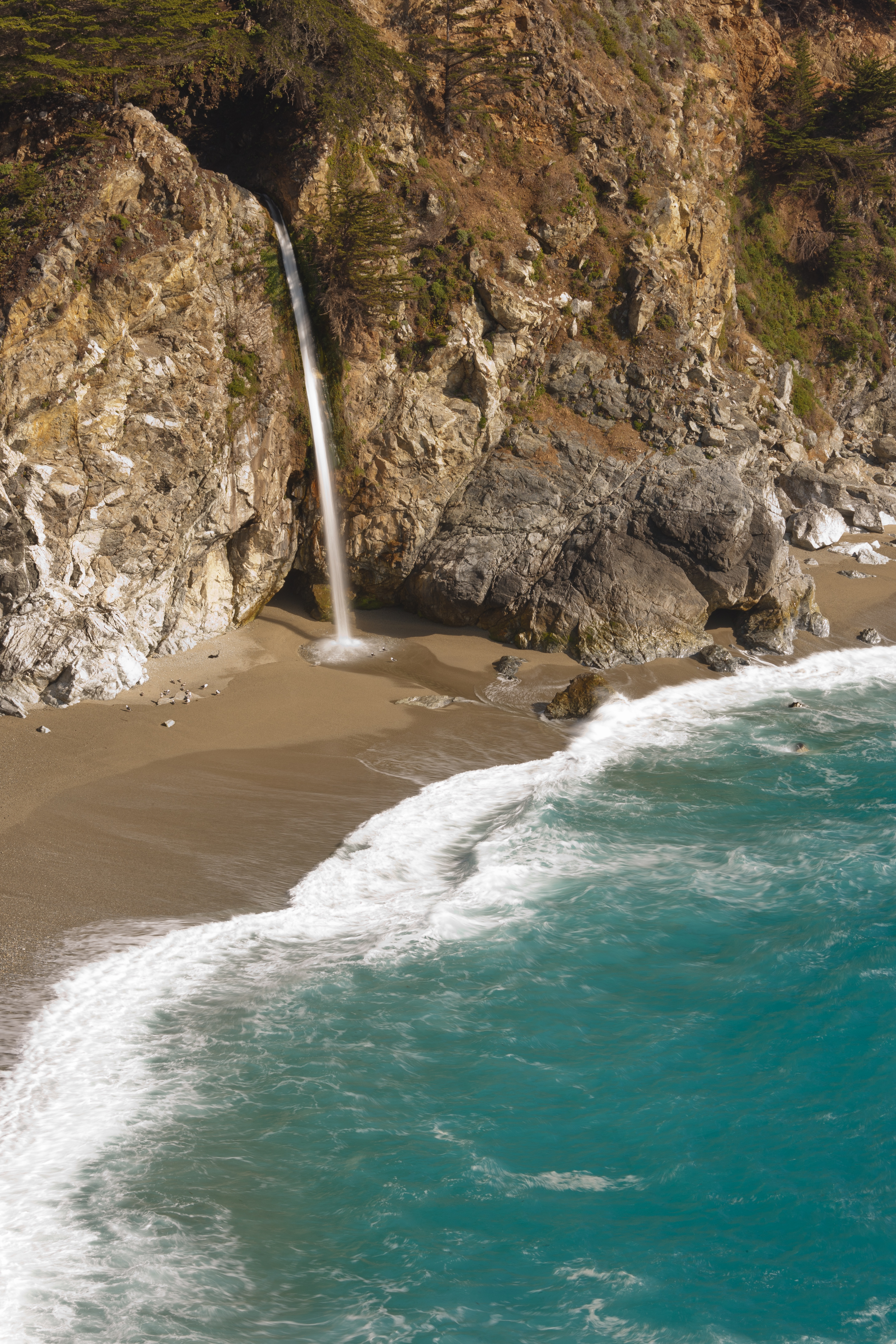
McWay Falls in Julia Pfeiffer Burns State Park, Big Sur, California

A coastal waterfall is a waterfall that plunges directly into the sea. Another common name for this feature is a tidefall.

== Notable coastal waterfalls ==
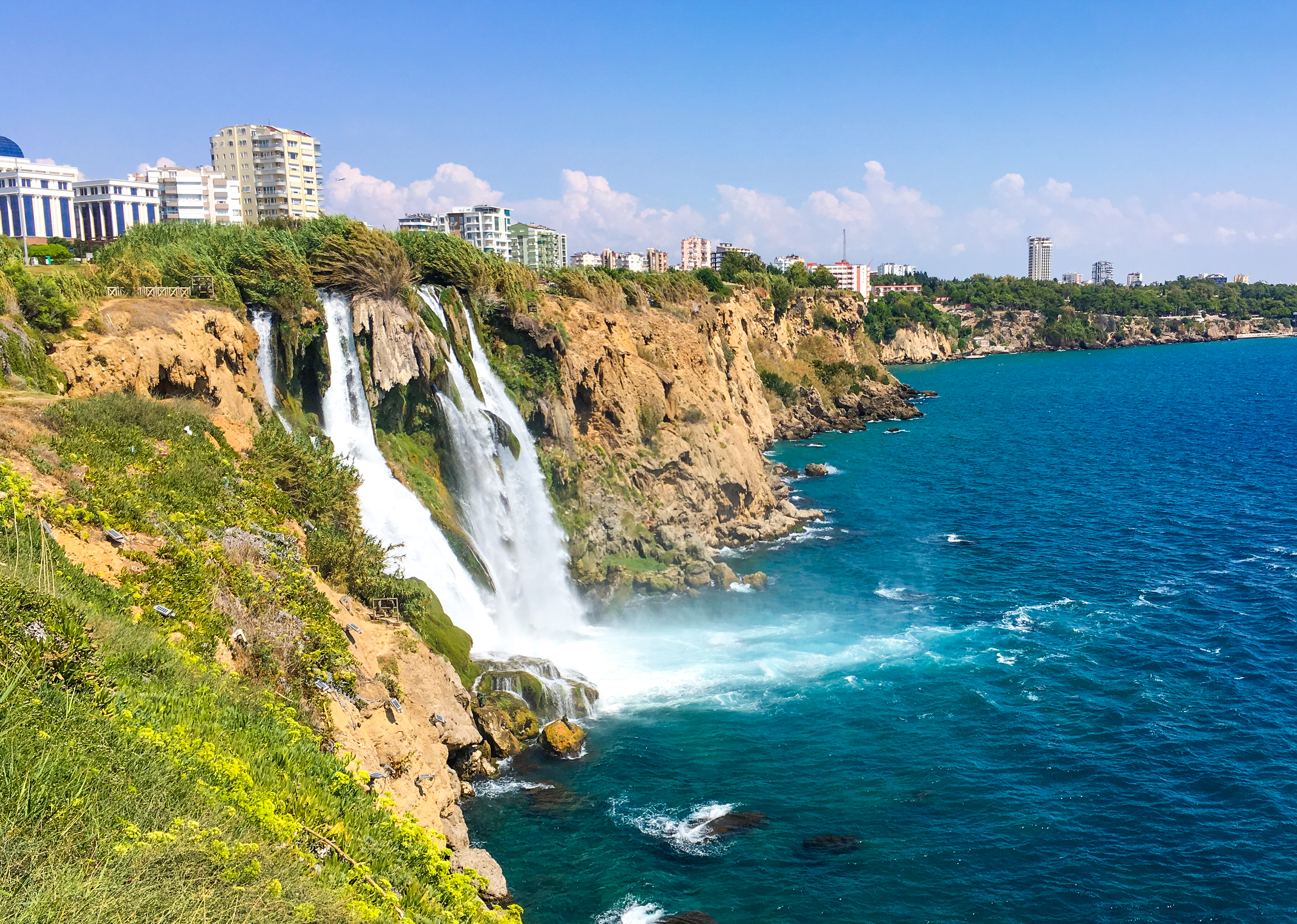
Lower Düden Waterfalls, Antalya, Turkey

Coastal waterfalls include:

- Waterfall Bay Falls, Hong Kong
- Bowen Falls, Milford Sound, New Zealand
- McWay Falls, Julia Pfeiffer Burns State Park, California
- Alamere Falls, Point Reyes National Seashore, California
- Hayburn Wyke, Scarborough, North Yorkshire, England
- Lower Düden Waterfalls, Antalya, Turkey

== See also ==
- List of waterfalls that empty into an ocean
