= Bolinas, California =

Unincorporated community in California, United States

- Unincorporated community Census-designated place
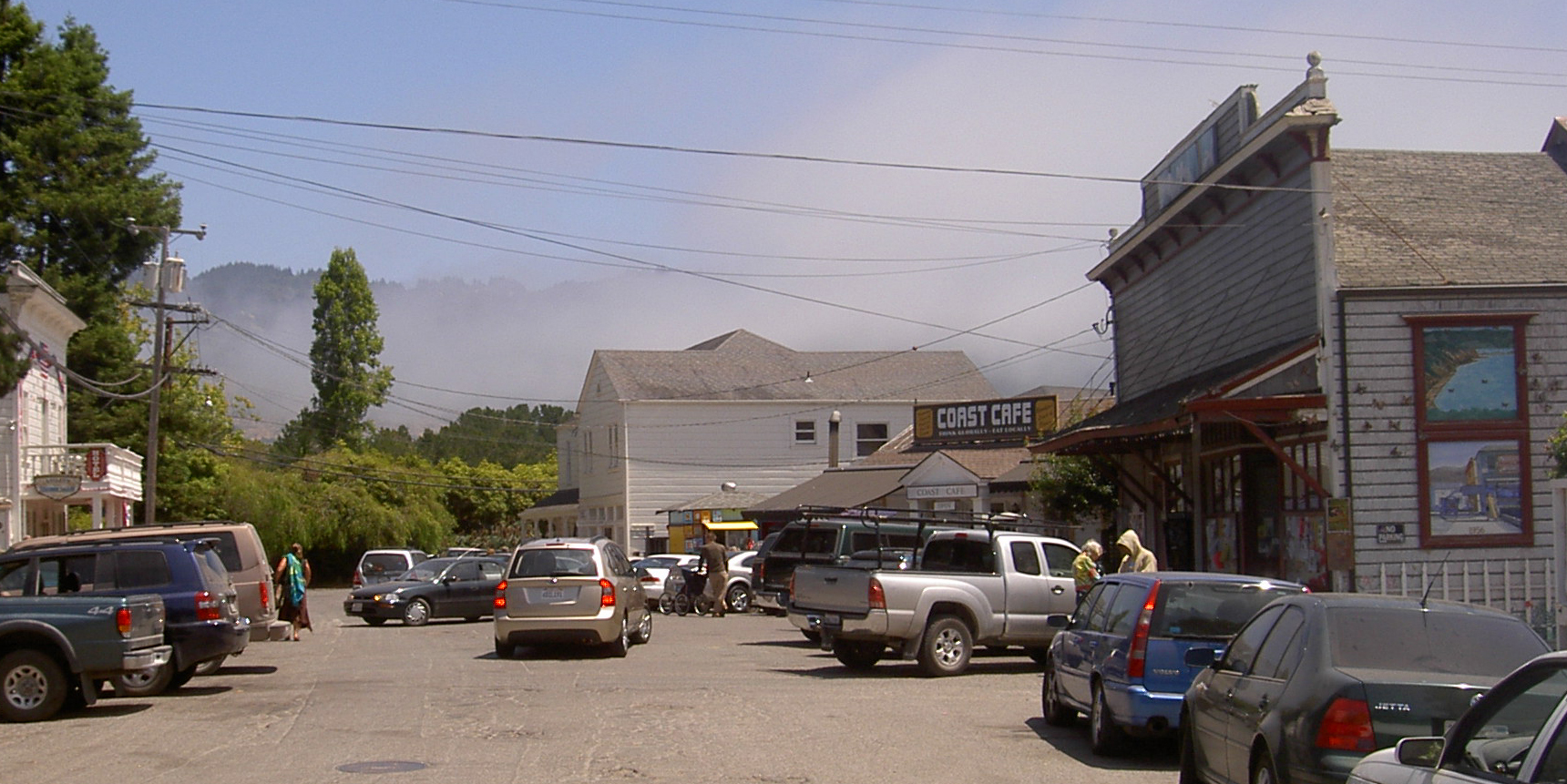
- Street scene in Bolinas, 2009

- Location in Marin County and the state of California

- Location in California Location in the United States
- Coordinates: 37°54′34″N 122°41′11″W
- Country: United States
- State: California
- County: Marin
- Established: 1863

Government
  - Type: Unincorporated
  - Supervisor: District 4 Dennis Rodoni
  - State senator: Mike McGuire (D)
  - Assemblymember: Damon Connolly (D)
  - U. S. rep.: Jared Huffman (D)

Area
  - Total: 5.83 sq mi (15.09 km^{2})
  - Land: 5.83 sq mi (15.09 km^{2})
  - Water: 0 sq mi (0.00 km^{2}) 0%
- Elevation: 36 ft (11 m)

Population (2020)
  - Total: 1,483
  - Density: 254.5/sq mi (98.27/km^{2})
- Time zone: UTC-8 (Pacific)
  - Summer (DST): UTC-7 (PDT)
- ZIP code: 94924
- Area codes: 415/628
- FIPS code: 06-07316
- GNIS feature IDs: 277476, 2407875

Bolinas is an unincorporated coastal community in Marin County, California, United States. It is located on the California coast, approximately 13 miles (21 km) (straight line distance) northwest of San Francisco, and 27 miles (43 km) by road. For statistical purposes, the United States Census Bureau has defined the community as a census-designated place (CDP). As of the 2020 census, it had a population of 1,483.

== History ==
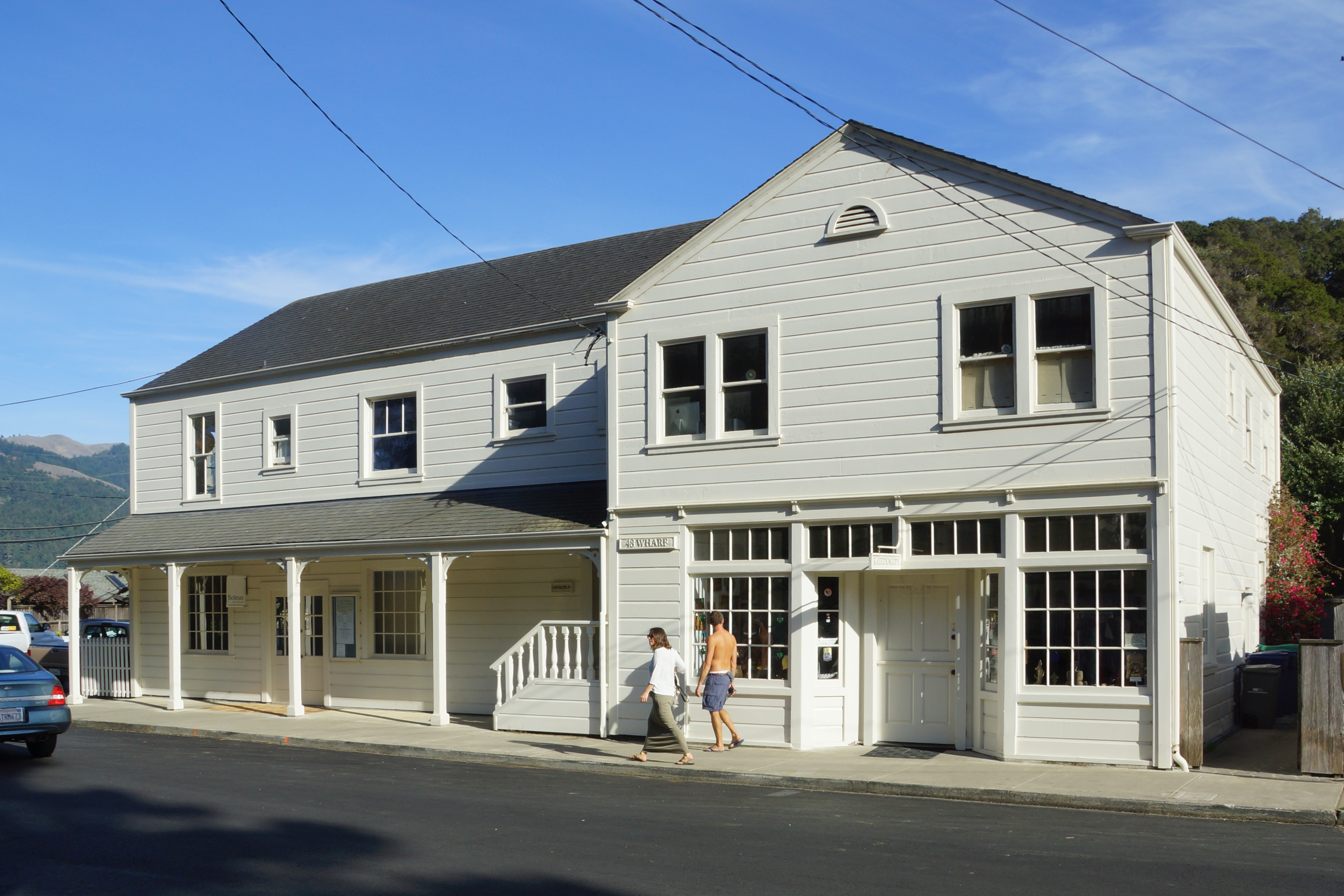
Bolinas Museum, 2013

Prior to the European colonization of California, the Coast Miwok lived in the area, possibly calling the area "Bali-N".

Bolinas and present-day Stinson Beach were once encompassed by Rancho Las Baulines, a Mexican land grant given by Governor Pío Pico to Gregorio Briones in 1846.

The first post office in the town of Bolinas opened in 1863. The post office closed on March 3, 2023. The town's residents have petitioned for it to reopen.

In 1927, a 300 acres (121 ha) former dairy farm on the Big Mesa was subdivided into a grid of streets and 5,336 lots measuring 20 ft × 100 ft (6.1 m × 30.5 m). Many of these lots were sold for $69.50 by the San Francisco Bulletin as a subscription promotion. Portions of the mesa, including sections of Ocean Parkway, have since eroded into the sea. A few streets on the mesa are paved and maintained by the county, but many are unpaved, and either maintained by adjoining property owners or completely unmaintained. The Big Mesa doesn't have sewer system, and houses on the mesa have individual septic systems.

The Bolinas beaches were hit hard by the 1971 San Francisco Bay oil spill, with the community coming together to clean the beach of crude oil.

The Bolinas Museum was founded in 1983. It contains five galleries featuring contemporary art, historical information, and works from local artists.

== Geography ==
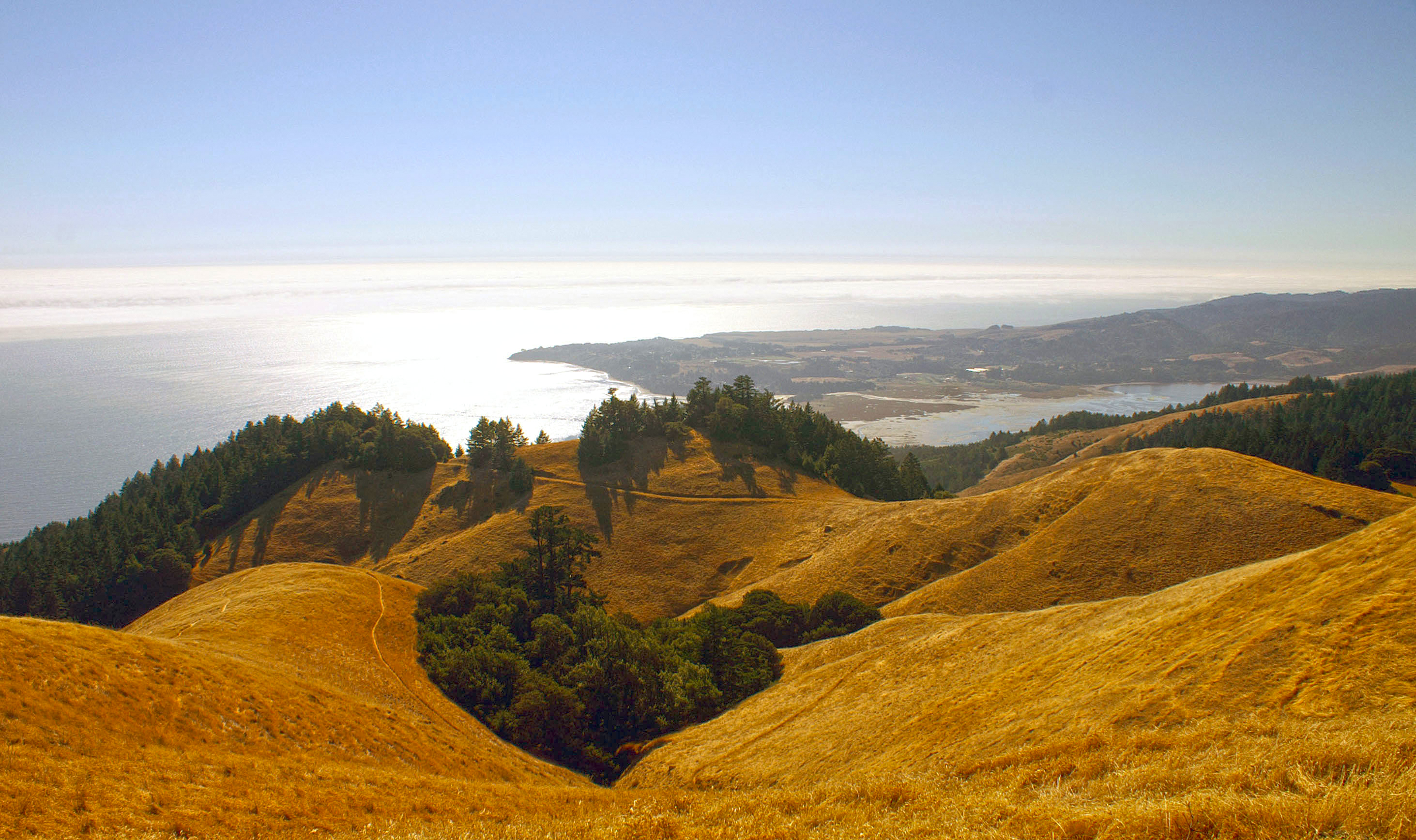
Bolinas Peninsula from Panoramic Highway

Bolinas sits at an elevation of 36 feet (11 m) above sea level. It is bordered on the northeast by Bolinas Lagoon and Kent Island, on the south by Bolinas Bay and Duxbury Point, on the southwest by the Pacific Ocean, and on the northwest by Point Reyes National Seashore. According to the United States Census Bureau, the CDP has a total area of 5.8 square miles (15 km^{2}), all land. The GNIS has cited archaic alternate town-names, including "Ballenas", "Baulenas", "Baulings", and "Bawlines".

Bolinas's downtown is located on the eastern side of town along Wharf Road, which ends at Bolinas Lagoon. The downtown buildings were mostly built between 1850 and 1920. Brighton Avenue connects downtown to the south-facing Brighton Beach. In the southeast corner of town is the Little Mesa. The Big Mesa, also known as the Gridded Mesa, lies to the west, with Agate Beach at its western end. Roughly 1.5 mi (2.4 km) of that is the Bolinas Military Reservation.

The community is known for its reclusive residents. It is only accessible via unmarked roads; any road sign along State Route 1 that points the way into town has been torn down by local residents, to the point where county officials offered a ballot measure to which the voters responded by stating a preference for no more signs.

Bolinas lies west of the San Andreas Fault, which runs the length of Bolinas Lagoon and continues northward through Olema Valley and Tomales Bay. Bolinas and the Point Reyes peninsula are on the Pacific Plate, moving north relative to Stinson Beach and the North American Plate at an average rate of approximately 1 inch (2.5 cm) per year.

Point Reyes National Seashore borders Bolinas to the northwest. Duxbury Reef State Marine Conservation Area encompasses Bolinas' western shoreline.

=== Climate ===
Bolinas experiences warm (occasionally hot) and dry summers, with some average monthly days in summer months above 77.1 °F (25.1 °C). According to the Köppen Climate Classification system, Bolinas has a warm-summer Mediterranean climate, abbreviated "Csb" on climate maps. Like much of the California coast, summer afternoons are often cool and windy (and sometimes foggy) as winds blow in off the ocean. It receives more rain than other coast cities in the San Francisco Bay Area in this latitude with 1,034.70 mm (40.736 in) of rain.

Climate data for Bolinas, California
Month	Jan	Feb	Mar	Apr	May	Jun	Jul	Aug	Sep	Oct	Nov	Dec	Year
Mean daily maximum °F (°C)	55.2 (12.9)	59.6 (15.3)	63.0 (17.2)	66.1 (18.9)	69.8 (21.0)	74.1 (23.4)	76.7 (24.8)	77.1 (25.1)	77.0 (25.0)	72.1 (22.3)	62.6 (17.0)	55.3 (12.9)	67.4 (19.7)
Daily mean °F (°C)	48.8 (9.3)	52.2 (11.2)	54.5 (12.5)	56.8 (13.8)	55.8 (13.2)	59.9 (15.5)	65.4 (18.6)	65.8 (18.8)	65.4 (18.6)	61.7 (16.5)	54.8 (12.7)	49.1 (9.5)	57.5 (14.2)
Mean daily minimum °F (°C)	42.3 (5.7)	44.7 (7.1)	45.9 (7.7)	47.4 (8.6)	50.0 (10.0)	52.7 (11.5)	54.0 (12.2)	54.4 (12.4)	53.8 (12.1)	51.3 (10.7)	47.0 (8.3)	42.9 (6.1)	48.9 (9.4)
Average precipitation inches (mm)	7.7 (200)	7.8 (200)	5.5 (140)	2.2 (56)	1.3 (33)	0.3 (7.6)	0 (0)	0.1 (2.5)	0.3 (7.6)	1.9 (48)	5.3 (130)	8.3 (210)	40.7 (1,034.7)
Source: Bestplaces.net

== Demographics ==
Historical population
Census	Pop.	Note	%±
1980	1,225		—
1990	1,098		−10.4%
2000	1,246		13.5%
2010	1,620		30.0%
2020	1,483		−8.5%
U.S. Decennial Census; 1860–1870 1880-1890; 1900 1910 1920; 1930 1940 1950; 1960 1970 1980; 1990 2000 2010; 2020

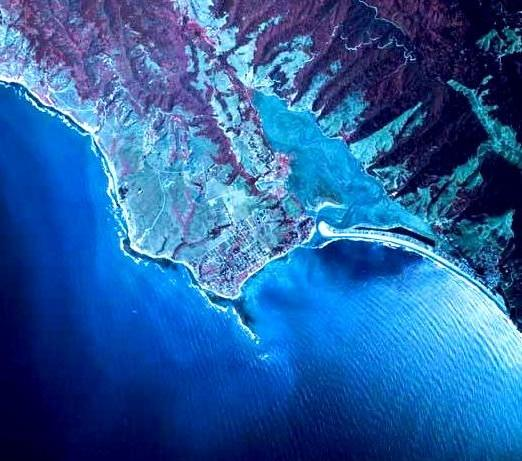
Bolinas Peninsula from 40,000 feet (12,000 m)

Bolinas first appeared as a census designated place in the 1980 U.S. census.

=== Racial and ethnic composition ===
Bolinas CDP, California – Racial and ethnic composition Note: the US Census treats Hispanic/Latino as an ethnic category. This table excludes Latinos from the racial categories and assigns them to a separate category. Hispanics/Latinos may be of any race.
Race / Ethnicity (NH = Non-Hispanic)	Pop 2000	Pop 2010	Pop 2020	% 2000	% 2010	% 2020
White alone (NH)	1,101	1,258	1,182	88.36%	77.65%	79.70%
Black or African American alone (NH)	22	8	12	1.77%	0.49%	0.81%
Native American or Alaska Native alone (NH)	4	3	6	0.32%	0.19%	0.40%
Asian alone (NH)	22	15	25	1.77%	0.93%	1.69%
Native Hawaiian or Pacific Islander alone (NH)	4	4	5	0.32%	0.25%	0.34%
Other race alone (NH)	3	2	10	0.24%	0.12%	0.67%
Mixed race or Multiracial (NH)	27	70	88	2.17%	4.32%	5.93%
Hispanic or Latino (any race)	63	260	155	5.06%	16.05%	10.45%
Total	1,246	1,620	1,483	100.00%	100.00%	100.00%

=== 2020 census ===
As of the 2020 census, Bolinas had a population of 1,483. The median age was 54.5 years. 14.0% of residents were under the age of 18 and 37.3% of residents were 65 years of age or older. For every 100 females there were 95.1 males, and for every 100 females age 18 and over there were 94.2 males age 18 and over.

0.0% of residents lived in urban areas, while 100.0% lived in rural areas.

There were 660 households in Bolinas, of which 16.2% had children under the age of 18 living in them. Of all households, 34.1% were married-couple households, 24.1% were households with a male householder and no spouse or partner present, and 32.6% were households with a female householder and no spouse or partner present. About 37.0% of all households were made up of individuals and 22.1% had someone living alone who was 65 years of age or older.

There were 887 housing units, of which 25.6% were vacant. The homeowner vacancy rate was 0.8% and the rental vacancy rate was 3.7%.

=== 2010 census ===
The 2010 United States census reported that the Bolinas CDP (Census-designated place) had a population of 1,620. The population density was 278.0 inhabitants per square mile (107.3/km^{2}). The racial makeup of Bolinas was 1,406 (86.8%) White, 27 (1.7%) African American, 10 (0.6%) Native American, 17 (1.0%) Asian, 14 (0.9%) Pacific Islander, 64 (4.0%) from other races, and 82 (5.1%) from two or more races. Hispanic or Latino of any race were 260 people (16.0%).

The census reported that 88.4% of the population lived in households and 11.6% lived in non-institutionalized group quarters.

There were 698 households, 144 (20.6%) had children under the age of 18 living in them, 259 (37.1%) were opposite-sex married couples living together, 54 (7.7%) had a female householder with no husband present, 32 (4.6%) had a male householder with no wife present. There were 49 (7.0%) unmarried opposite-sex partnerships, and nine (1.3%) same-sex married couples or partnerships. There were 280 households (40.1%) made up of individuals, and 98 (14.0%) had someone living alone who was 65 or older. The average household size was 2.05. There were 345 families (49.4% of all households); the average family size was 2.65.

The age distribution was 234 people (14.4%) under the age of 18, 76 people (4.7%) aged 18 to 24, 385 people (23.8%) aged 25 to 44, 642 people (39.6%) aged 45 to 64, and 283 people (17.5%) who were 65 or older. The median age was 49.3 years. For every 100 females, there were 115.1 males. For every 100 females age 18 and over, there were 113.6 males.

There were 986 housing units at an average density of 169.2 per square mile, of the occupied units 57.4% were owner-occupied and 42.6% were rented. The homeowner vacancy rate was 1.7%; the rental vacancy rate was 2.6%. 54.1% of the population lived in owner-occupied housing units and 34.3% lived in rental housing units.

=== 2000 census ===
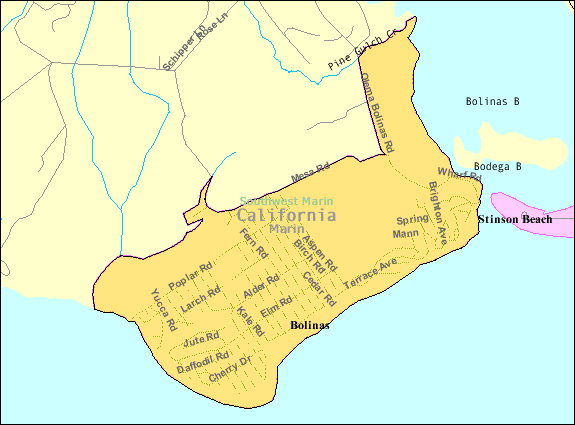
Bolinas CDP, California (dark yellow)

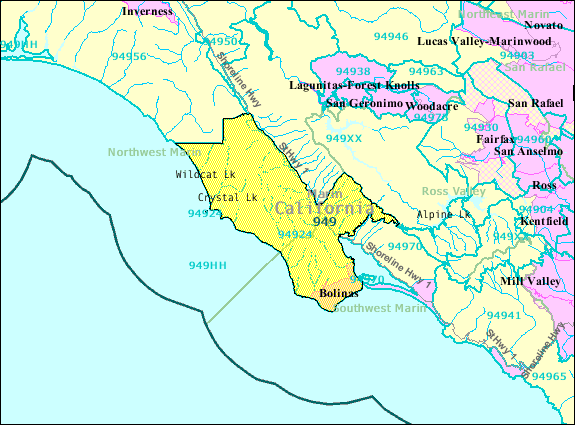
94924 ZIP Code Tabulation Area (bright yellow)

At the 2000 census there were 1,246 people in 486 households, including 260 families, in the CDP. The population density was 900.6 inhabitants per square mile (347.7/km^{2}). There were 629 housing units at an average density of 454.7 per square mile (175.6/km^{2}). The racial makeup of the CDP in 2000 was 77.7% non-Hispanic White, 0.5% non-Hispanic Black or African American, 0.2% Native American, 0.9% Asian, 0.2% Pacific Islander, 0.1% from other races, and 4.3% from two or more races. 16.0% of the population were Hispanic or Latino of any race. Of the 486 households 27.4% had children under the age of 18 living with them, 39.9% were married couples living together, 10.5% had a female householder with no husband present, and 46.3% were non-families. Of all households, 32.1% were one person and 4.5% had someone living alone who was 65 or older. The average household size was 2.29 and the average family size was 2.87.

The age distribution was 21.0% under the age of 18, 4.7% from 18 to 24, 26.0% from 25 to 44, 40.3% from 45 to 64, and 8.0% who were 65 or older. The median age was 44 years. For every 100 females, there were 110.8 males. For every 100 females age 18 and over, there were 102.1 males.

The median household income was $53,188 and the median family income was $56,111. Males had a median income of $48,281 versus $40,417 for females. The per capita income for the CDP was $28,973. About 5.5% of families and 10.2% of the population were below the poverty line, including 6.7% of those under age 18 and 2.8 percent of those age 65 or over.

The much larger area defined by the Census Bureau as ZIP Code Tabulation Area (ZCTA) 94924, which includes Horseshoe Hill, Dogtown, and Five Brooks, had a population of 1,372 according to the 2020–2024 American Community Survey 5-year estimates (see map).

== Education ==
Bolinas is in the Bolinas-Stinson Union School District, the Tamalpais Union High School District, and the Marin Community College District. Students in primary grades (kindergarten – grade 2) attend Stinson Beach School, while elementary grade students (grades 3–8) attend Bolinas School. Bolinas is included in the attendance area of Tamalpais High School, in Mill Valley.

In 1951, Ford Times identified Bolinas as the first in its series of "Tom Sawyer Towns... a good place for boys and girls to live and grow... its school days, its summer vacations, its vast adventures in fishing, swimming, baseball, basking and dreaming in the sun. Such a place is Bolinas."

== Government ==
Bolinas is unincorporated, receiving general government services from Marin County, including law enforcement, land use planning, public health, and code enforcement. Two special districts provide local services. The Bolinas Community Public Utility District provides water and wastewater service and contracts for garbage and recycling collection. The Bolinas Fire Protection District provides fire protection, emergency medical care, and disaster management services.

=== Bolinas Community Public Utility District ===
In 1967, the Bolinas Community Public Utility District was formed by the Marin County Board of Supervisors. It merged two local water districts, the Bolinas Beach Public Utility District which served the Big Mesa, and the Bolinas Public Utility District which served the Downtown and Little Mesa, with the Marin County Sanitary District #3, formed in 1908 to provide sewer service in the downtown. The BCPUD provides water service and solid waste pickup throughout Bolinas, and sewer service to the Downtown and Little Mesa.

In November 1971, the Bolinas Community Public Utility District instituted a moratorium on new water permits, which halted the construction of new homes. The moratorium was based on the limited local water supply during the summer months and in drought years, and also serves to limit new development in Bolinas. In 1990, the BCPUD enacted a moratorium on new sewer connections, to address the limited capacity of the sewage collection system. Many lots, especially on the Big Mesa, remain undeveloped.

In 2003, Bolinas voters adopted Measure G, authored by Bolinas artist Jane "Dakar" Blethen. The advisory measure called for the following language to be adopted as a policy of the Bolinas Community Public Utility District:

Vote for Bolinas to be a socially acknowledged nature-loving town because to like to drink the water out of the lakes to like to eat the blueberries to like the bears is not hatred to hotels and motor boats. Dakar. Temporary and way to save life, skunks and foxes (airplanes to go over the ocean) and to make it beautiful.

== Parks and recreation ==
Besides the public access beach near the downtown area, there is a county park, Agate Beach, which contains extensive tide pools that are protected as part of the Gulf of the Farallones National Marine Sanctuary. The town also hosts the Marin-Bolinas Botanical Gardens, and borders on the Point Reyes National Seashore to the north. Alamere Falls, one of only two beach waterfalls in the continental U.S., is on the California Coastal Trail from Palomarin Trailhead at the end of Mesa Road.

Duxbury Reef State Marine Conservation Area lies offshore from Bolinas. As an underwater park, this marine protected area helps conserve ocean wildlife and marine ecosystems.

== In popular culture ==
Bolinas and its reclusive reputation are featured in the 1981 novel Ecotopia Emerging by Ernest Callenbach.

Wildflowers, a 1999 film starring Daryl Hannah, was partly filmed in Bolinas.

Radio Free Bolinas was a pirate radio station that was founded in 1978, and was shut down by the FCC sometime after the station had a call from San Francisco, over 10 miles away and out of their broadcast range.

== See also ==
- Lighter Wharf
- California Historical Landmarks in Marin County
