= Bolinas Military Reservation =

- Near Bolinas, California in United States
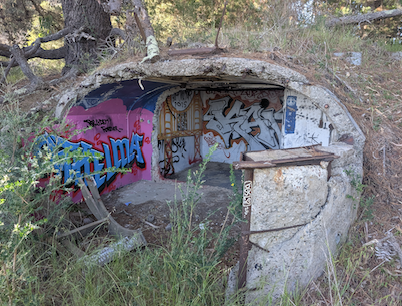
- A bunker in the reservation

Site information
- Type: Coastal defense
- Owner: Private owner

Location
- Coordinates: 37°55′15.282″N 122°43′08.008″W
- Area: 13.65 acres (5.52 ha)

Site history
- Built: 1941
- Fate: Quitclaimed in 1960

The Bolinas Military Reservation was a military fire control reservation located overlooking the Pacific Ocean in western Marin County, California. Named for the nearby town of Bolinas, the reservation was established with the purchase of 9 acres of land by the United States Department of War on December 30, 1940.

== Beginnings ==
A plan for the Bolinas Military Reservation was put into action on January 13, 1939, when the adjutant general of the United States Department of War authorized the purchase of 8.98 acres (3.63 ha) northeast of Mesa County Road (now Mesa Road) near the town of Bolinas to be used for the Bolinas Military Reservation. 1.61 acres (0.65 ha) of the land was to be used for a road leading to the site. The purchase was made on December 30, 1940. Construction started in 1941 with the erection of 2 reinforced concrete bunkers on the property. A third bunker was constructed in September 1941. Then, following a letter dated April 15, 1942 from the harbor defense commander to the commanding general, a wood-frame structure able to house 16 men was constructed as well. On March 24, 1943, another 4.67 acres (1.89 ha) of land was purchased in order for a more concealed access road. In 1944, the US Army Corps of Engineers constructed a 48 square feet (4.5 m^{2}) reinforced concrete powerhouse with a generator on the site.

== Construction and use ==
Despite being permanent fixtures, the bunkers lacked heating, water and sewer connections, and latrines. The bunkers were all set into the ground and camouflaged. The first 2 bunkers had 1-inch thick steel domes for protection and manholes for entry, while the third bunker had a reinforced concrete roof and a steel door for access. Additionally, a single M2 .50 caliber antiaircraft machine gun was located just outside the fence line on a small hill behind one of the bunkers. The bunkers were used to supply target azimuth angles to nearby harbor defense guns.

== Afterwards ==
In 1948, the harbor defenses of San Francisco, including the Bolinas Military Reservation, were deactivated, and all guns were declared surplus. In October 1951, the reservation was transferred to the United States Department of the Navy. However, just over a year later, control of the site returned to the United States Army. The General Services Administration gained control of the site in May 1959, before quitclaiming it to a private owner in June 1960. So far, the United States Government has spent at least $22,000 on cleanup of hazardous materials at the site. The last cleanup effort was in June 2012, with the Department of Defense declaring the cleanup of the site complete.
