= Marin-Bolinas Botanical Gardens =

Botanical gardens in Bolinas, California

Coordinates: 37.9094°N 122.686°W

The Marin-Bolinas Botanical Gardens (14 acres) are botanical gardens specializing in succulents, located in Bolinas, California, United States. They are not open to the public as of 2018. The gardens were created by Dr. Herman Schwartz, a retired physician. They now contain over 2,000 species; the children's garden has 280 types of succulents. The gardens include six greenhouses, including ones dedicated to aloes and euphorbias. A Marin County native flower garden (6.5 acres) is currently being added.

== See also ==
- List of botanical gardens in the United States
