= Duxbury Reef State Marine Conservation Area =

Protected area in California, US

Duxbury Reef State Marine Conservation Area (SMCA) is a marine protected area located about 1 mile (2 km) west of Bolinas in Marin County on California’s north central coast. This marine protected area covers 0.66 square miles (1.7 km^{2}). Duxbury Reef SMCA prohibits the take of all living marine resources, except the recreational take of finfish from shore only and the recreational take of abalone.

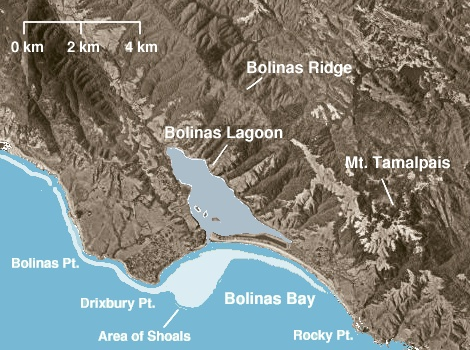

== History ==
Duxbury Reef SMCA is one of 22 marine protected areas adopted by the California Department of Fish and Game in August 2009, during the second phase of the Marine Life Protection Act Initiative. The MLPAI is a collaborative public process to create a statewide network of protected areas along California's coastline.

The north central coast's new marine protected areas were designed by local divers, fishermen, conservationists and scientists who comprised the North Central Coast Regional Stakeholder Group. Their job was to design a network of protected areas that would preserve sensitive sea life and habitats while enhancing recreation, study and education opportunities.

The north central coast marine protected areas took effect May 1, 2010.

== Geography and natural features ==
Duxbury Reef SMCA is a marine protected area located about 1 mile (2 km) west of Bolinas in Marin County on California's north central coast. Duxbury Reef is one of the largest shale reefs in North America and lies north of San Francisco’s Golden Gate Bridge, within the Point Reyes National Seashore.

The Duxbury Reef SMCA is bounded by the mean high tide line, a distance of 1,000 feet (300 m) seaward of mean lower low water and the following points:

1. 37°55.52′N 122°44.17′W
2. 37°55.42′N 122°44.31′W
3. 37°53.65′N 122°41.91′W and
4. 37°53.77′N 122°42.02′W.

== Habitat and wildlife ==
With one of the largest shale reefs in North America, Duxbury Reef contains various habitats including rocky and soft bottom, shallow rocky reefs and bull kelp beds. These habitats are home to many fish, marine mammal and seabird populations, including white sharks. They also host diverse marine invertebrate and algae populations. The Duxbury Reef SMCA will offer increased protections to these benthic species in a heritage area, while allowing traditional access.

== Recreation and nearby attractions ==
Through a haze of salty fog, visitors can observe the thunderous ocean breakers washing over long sandy beaches and crashing into rocky cliffs. Point Reyes National Seashore covers over 100 square miles (260 km^{2}) and includes 3,300 acres (13 km^{2}) of coastal wilderness area. The undeveloped coastline stretches for 80 miles (130 km). Extensive recreational activities include hiking, biking, camping and wildlife viewing. Kayaking in nearby Bolinas Lagoon or surfing at Bolinas or Stinson Beach are also popular activities. There are three visitor centers and extensive ranger-led programs.

Duxbury Reef SMCA prohibits removal of any living marine resources, except the recreational fishing of finfish from shore only and the recreational hunting of abalone. However, California's marine protected areas encourage recreational and educational uses of the ocean. Activities such as kayaking, diving, snorkeling, and swimming are allowed unless otherwise restricted.

== Scientific monitoring ==
As specified by the Marine Life Protection Act, select marine protected areas along California's central coast are being monitored by scientists to track their effectiveness and learn more about ocean health. Similar studies in marine protected areas located off of the Santa Barbara Channel Islands have already detected gradual improvements in fish size and number.
