= Bøsdalafossur =

Waterfall in the Faroe Islands

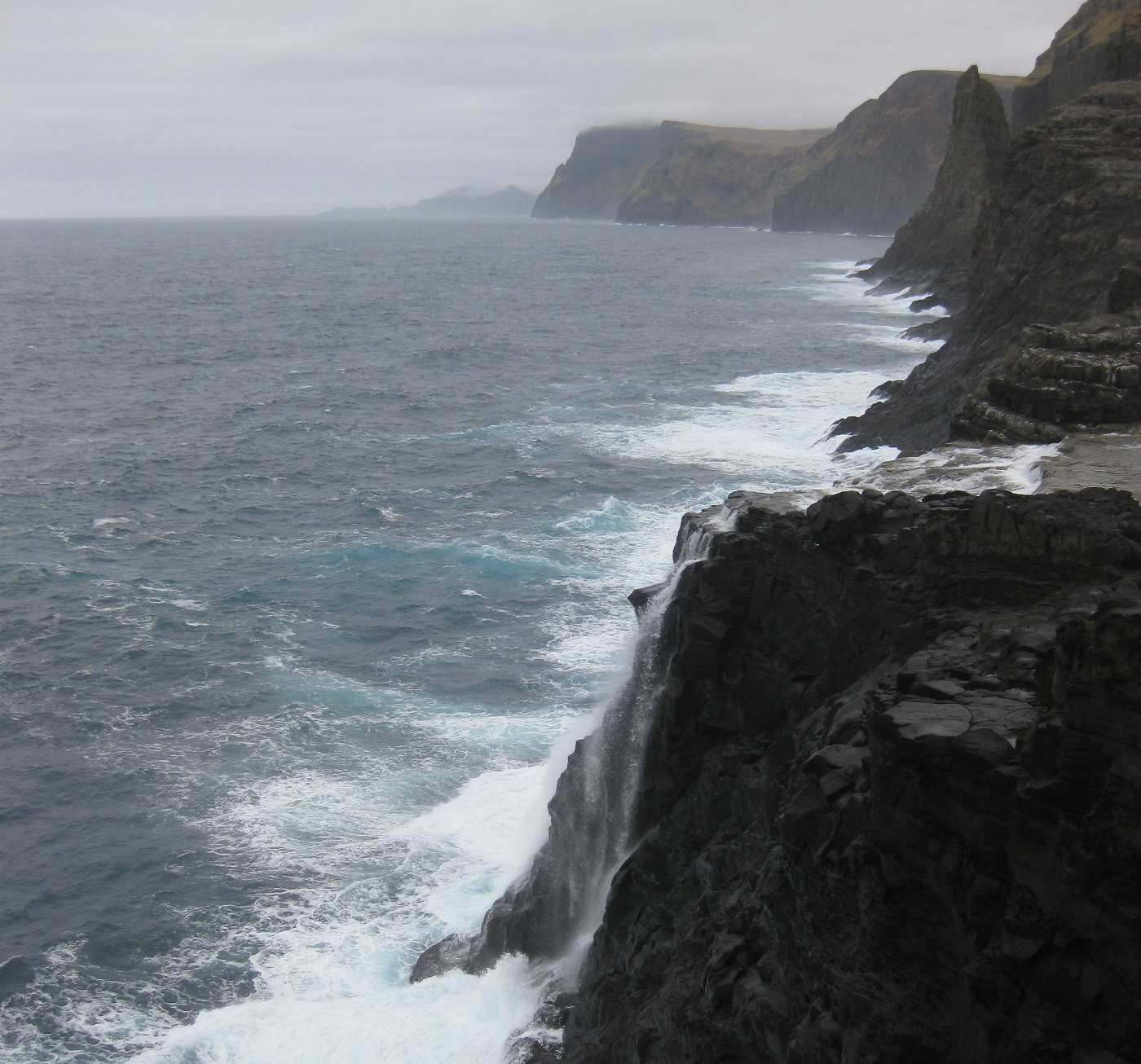
- Interactive map of Bøsdalafossur
- Location: Bøsdalafossur, Faroe Islands
- Coordinates: 62°01′32″N 7°13′26″W
- Total height: 30 meters

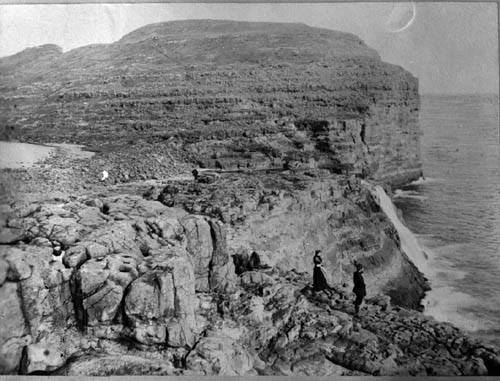
Bøsdalafossur pictured in 1899

Bøsdalafossur is a waterfall in the Faroe Islands that flows from the lake Sørvágsvatn/Leitissvatn into the Atlantic Ocean. It has a height of 30 meters.

== See also ==
- List of waterfalls
