= Duden (surname) =

Duden is a German surname. Notable people with the surname include:

- Anne Duden (born 1942), German writer
- Bob Duden (1920–1995), American golfer
- Dick Duden (1924–2013), American football player
- Gottfried Duden (1789–1856), German writer
- Konrad Duden (1829–1911), German philologist and lexicographer
