= Alamere Falls =

Tidefall in Point Reyes National Seashore, California, United States

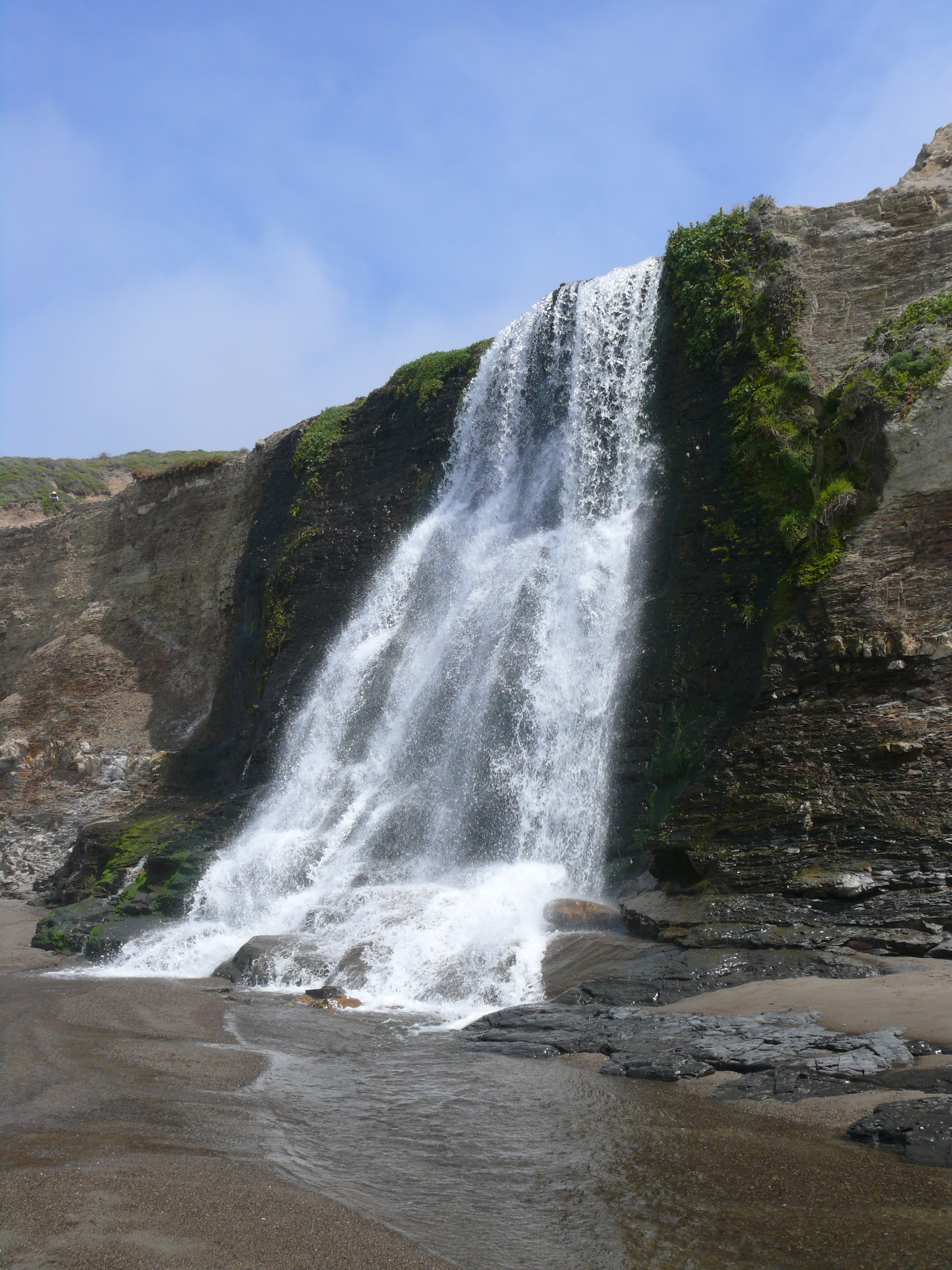

- Location within California
- Location: Point Reyes National Seashore, Marin County, California, United States
- Coordinates: 37°57′13.4″N 122°47′00.2″W
- Type: Horsetail
- Number of drops: 4
- Longest drop: 40 feet (12 m)

Alamere Falls is a coastal waterfall in Point Reyes National Seashore, Marin County, California; it flows directly into the ocean. It is one of only two coastal waterfalls in California, the other being McWay Falls.

Alamere Falls tumbles over fragile shale cliffs at Alamere Creek Beach. Upstream of the main Alamere Falls is the upper Alamere Falls, consisting of three separate cascades. Together, these cascades are approximately 20–30 feet (6–9 m) in height. All of these waterfalls are fed by Alamere Creek.

Alamere Falls can be reached by following the Coast Trail from the Palomarin Trailhead at the end of Mesa Road out of Bolinas, California. After 2.5 mi (4.0 km), the trail passes two small lakes (Bass Lake and Pelican Lake). Bass Lake can be accessed by a side trail that leads to a rope swing, and hikers often stop for a swim during summer months. From the Palomarin Trailhead, the hike is 3.8 mi (6.1 km), one-way, to the top of the falls. To reach the bottom of the falls, the National Park Service advises hikers to continue to Wildcat Campground, descend to the beach and then walk 1.1 mi (1.8 km) south; the one-way distance from Palomarin Trailhead to the base of the falls is 6.6 mi (10.6 km). This trail leads along the beach, check out the tides before to figure out the exact time for low tide. Usually, the beach to Alamere Falls is unsafe to access at high tide, and hikers are frequently trapped.

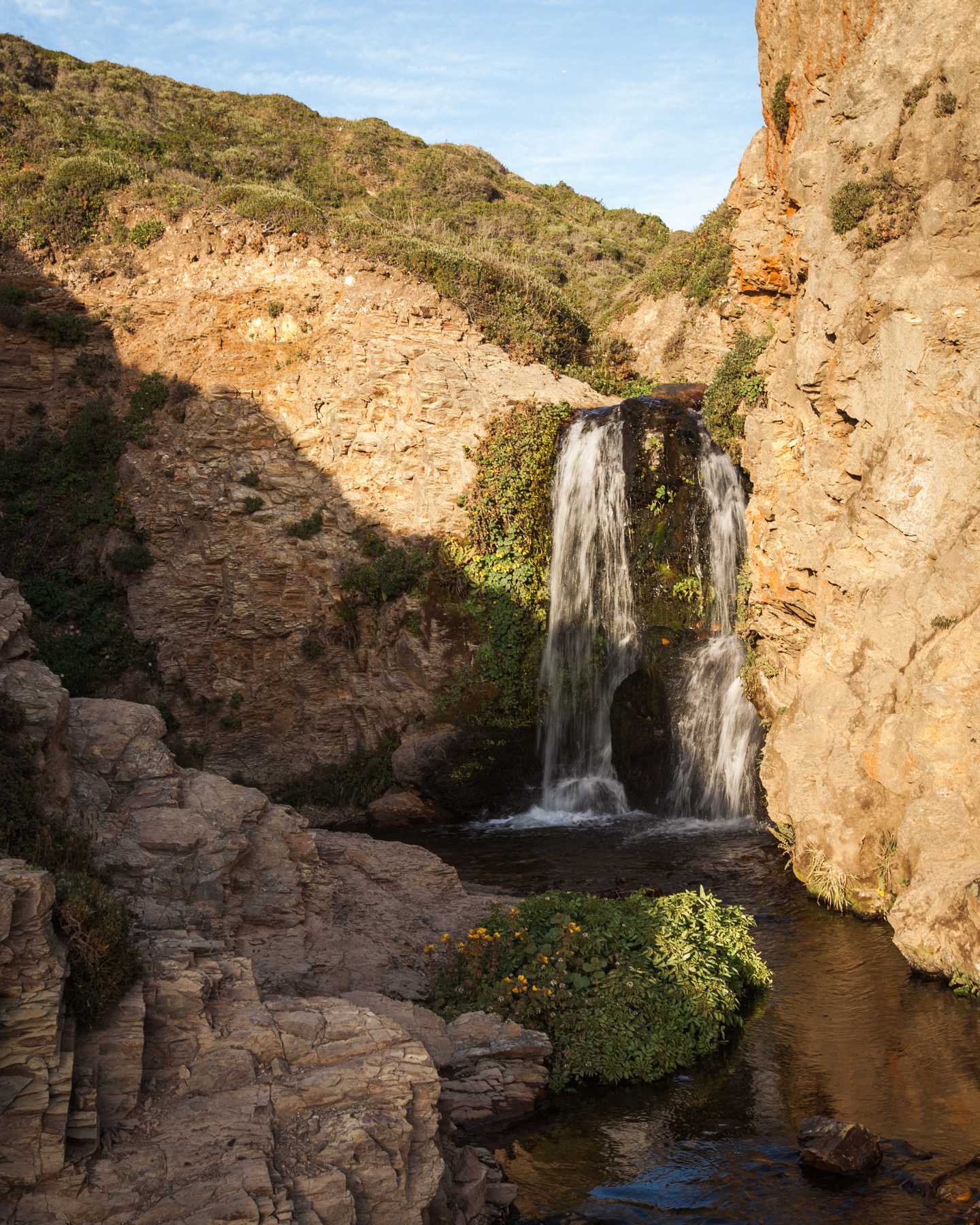
The uppermost falls in the system.

== See also ==
- List of waterfalls
- List of waterfalls in California
