= Düden River =

River in Antalya, Turkey

The Düden River (Turkish: Düden Su; Ancient Greek: Καταρράκτης - Katarraktes; Latin: Catarrhactes) is a river of southern Anatolia, Turkey, the lower reaches of which traverse the Düden Waterfalls, and enter the Mediterranean Sea east of Antalya.

Anciently, it was a major river of Pamphylia. Pomponius Mela describes its ancient names as being so called because it has a great fall or cataract. He places the town of Perga between the Cestrus and the Catarrhactes. The Stadiasmus describes it by the term οἱ Καταρράκται, or "the Falls". Strabo also speaks of this river as falling over a high rock.

This river, on approaching the coast, divides into several branches, which, falling over the cliffs that border this part of the coast, have formed a calcareous deposit. Through this calcareous crust the water finds its way to the sea, and the river has now no determinate outlet, unless, adds Leake, it be after heavy rains, when, it precipitates itself copiously over the cliffs near the most projecting point of the coast, a little to the west of Laara. According to the Stadiasmus the outlet of the river was at a place called Masura, probably the Magydus of Ptolemy or the Mygdale of the Stadiasmus may be Magydus.

== Düdenbaşı Waterfall karstic system ==
About 30 km (19 miles) north of Antalya (just north of Döşemealtı), two big karstic sources appear. These sources, Kırkgözler (around 37.0957°N 30.5807°E) and Pınarbaşı (37.1667°N 30.5994°E), merge after a short flow and disappear into Bıyıklı Sinkhole (37.10241°N 30.61642°E).

The water that disappears at Bıyıklı Sinkhole travels 14 km (9 mi) underground, shows itself briefly at Varsak pit (36.99215°N 30.71326°E), and then, after another 3 km (2 mi), appears again at the base of the Upper Düden Waterfall (36.96382°N 30.72691°E).

Part of the water is diverted through a canal from the Kirkgöz Springs to a reservoir at 36.95397°N 30.62860°E, from where it drops 162 metres (531 ft) through an underground pipe into Kepez 1 Hydroelectric Power Plant (36.9407°N 30.6238°E). Part of the water leaving the power plant travels through a canal to the Upper Düden Waterfall, where it creates the actual waterfall.

At the Upper Düden Waterfall, the water coming up from the ground (together with the water from the waterfall) forms a large river. Seven irrigation trenches distribute the water to land north-east of Antalya. The waters of the river separate into a number of streams and finally, east of Antalya, cascade 40 metres (131 ft) from a platform into the Mediterranean as the Lower Düden Waterfall (36.85093°N 30.78337°E). A park surrounds this waterfall. It can also be seen from the sea by taking a boat trip from Antalya yacht harbour.
