= Düden Waterfalls =

Group of waterfalls in Antalya, Turkey

- Interactive map of Düden Waterfalls

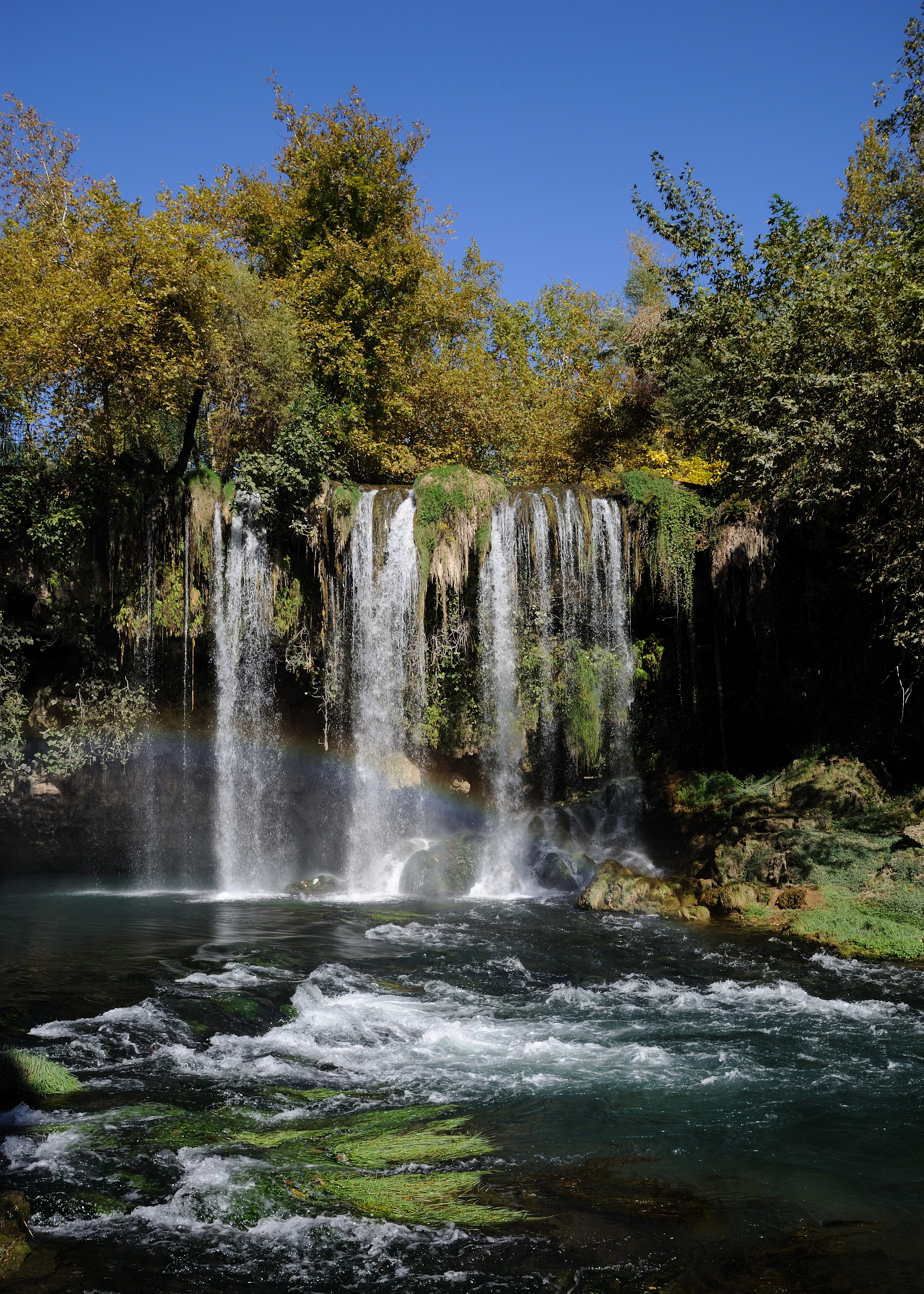
Upper Düden Falls

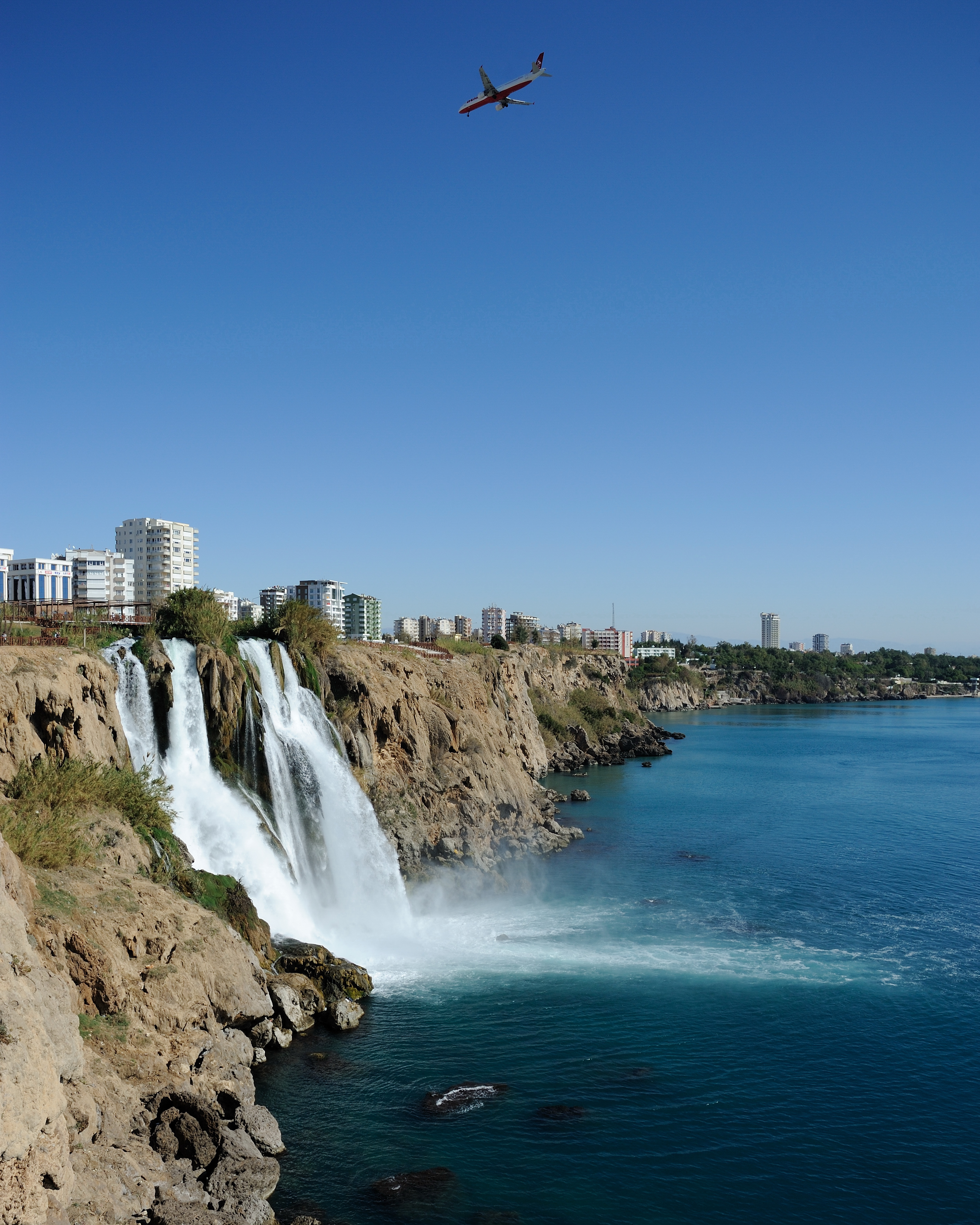
Lower Düden Falls

The Düden Waterfalls are two waterfalls of the Düden River in the province of Antalya, Turkey.

== Upper Düden Waterfall ==
At the Upper Düden Waterfall (36°57′49.7″N 30°43′36.1″E), the water of the Düden River reappears from a karstic source after having disappeared 18 kilometres (11 mi) away at Bıyıklı Sinkhole. Water coming through a canal from Kepez 1 Hydroelectric Power Plant forms the waterfall, which drops into the basin of the source.

The source and waterfall are surrounded by a park. The site is fenced in and can only be accessed at the opening hours and by paying a fee. The opening hours are 08:00–19:00 from April to October and 08:00–18:00 from November to March. As of 2025, the fee is 70 TL (around 1.90 €) per adult. The entrance to the park with the waterfalls is located at 21. Cd. road in Şelale Mahallesi.

=== Gallery ===
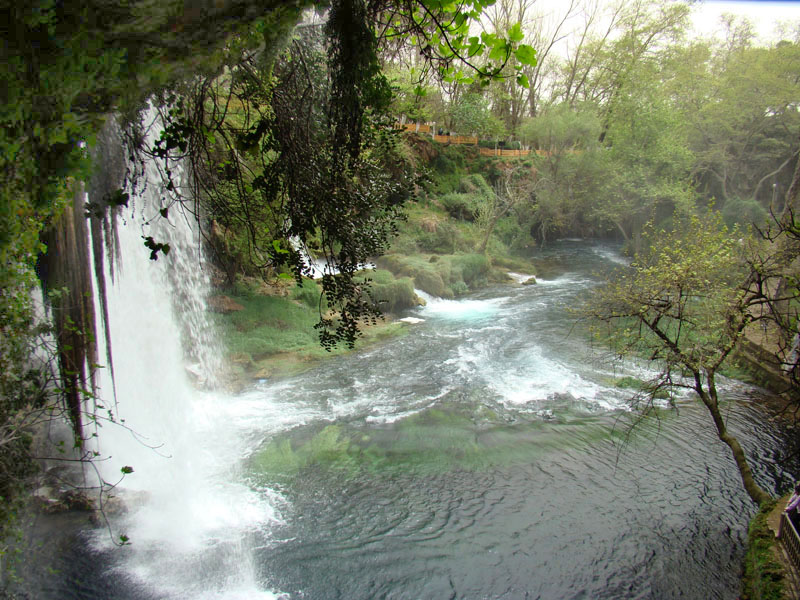

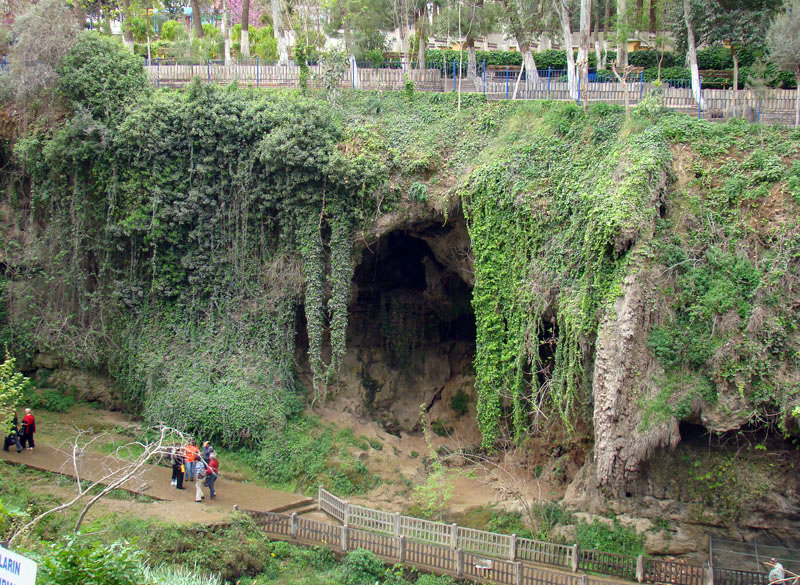

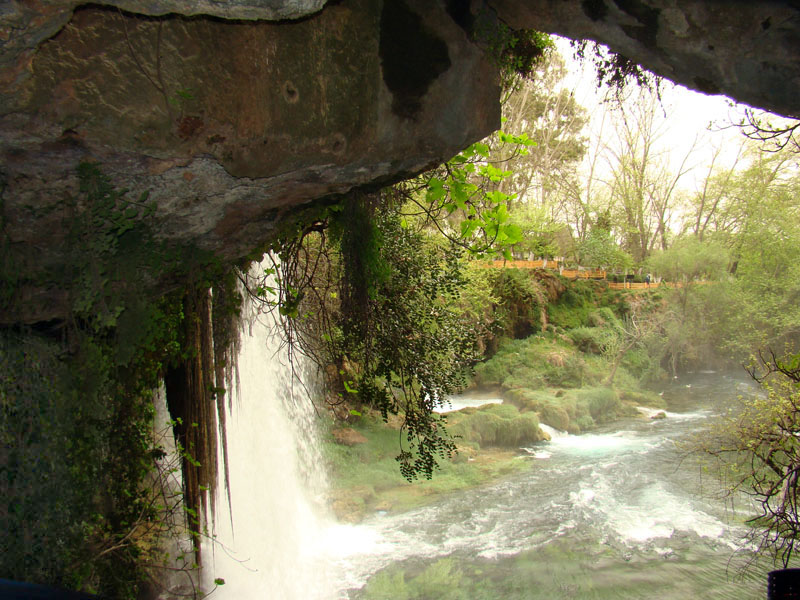

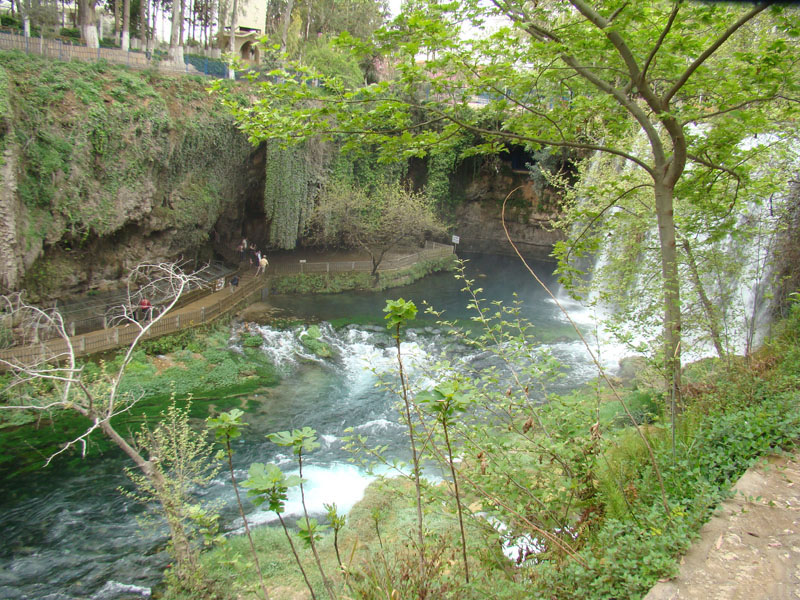

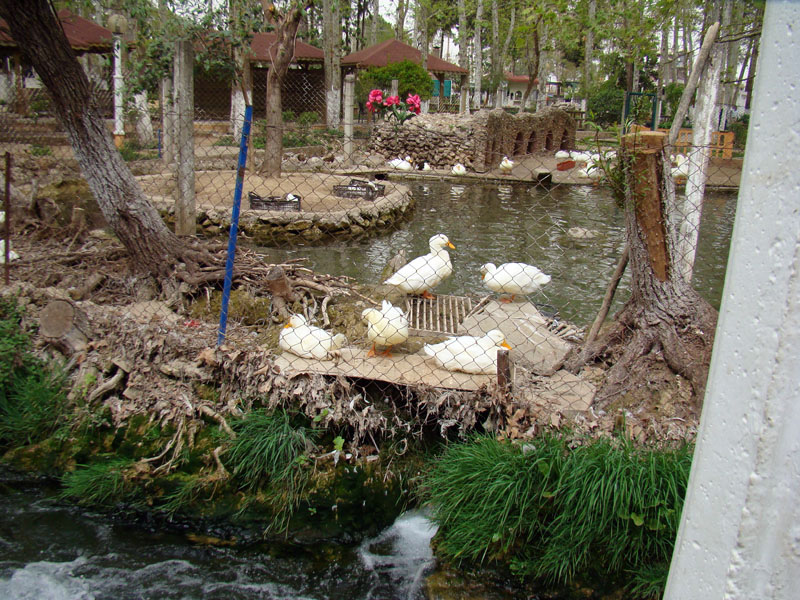

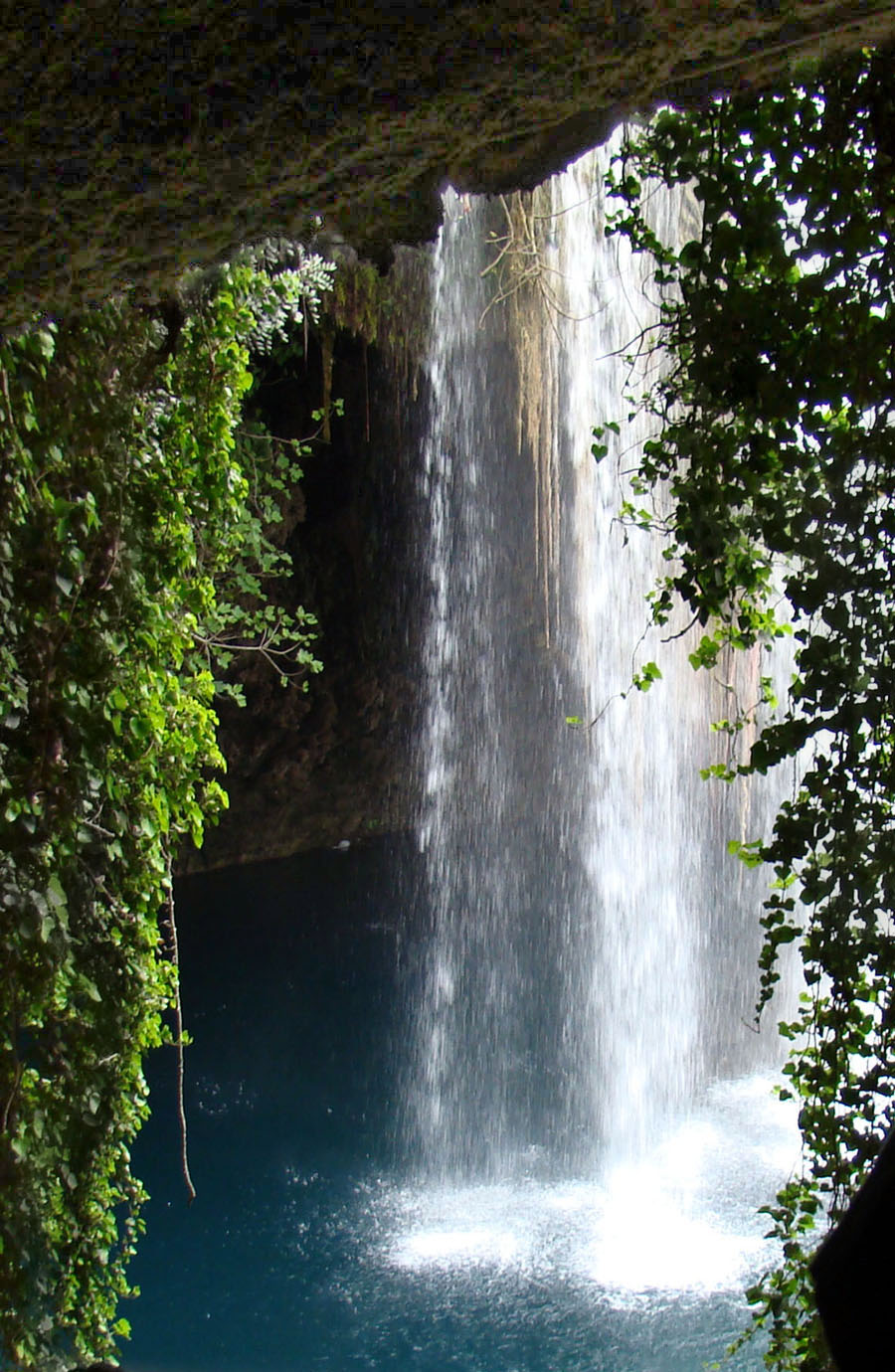

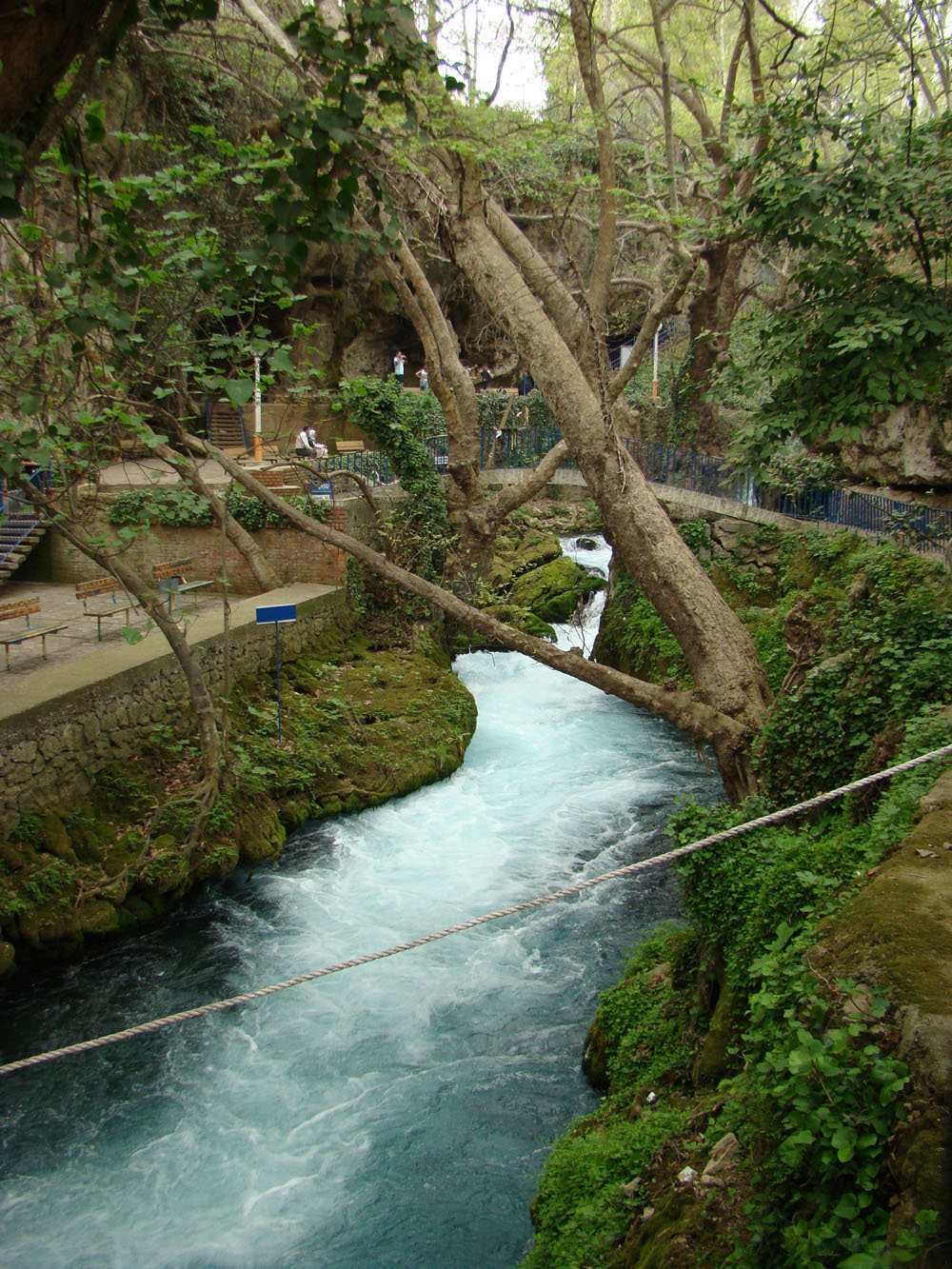

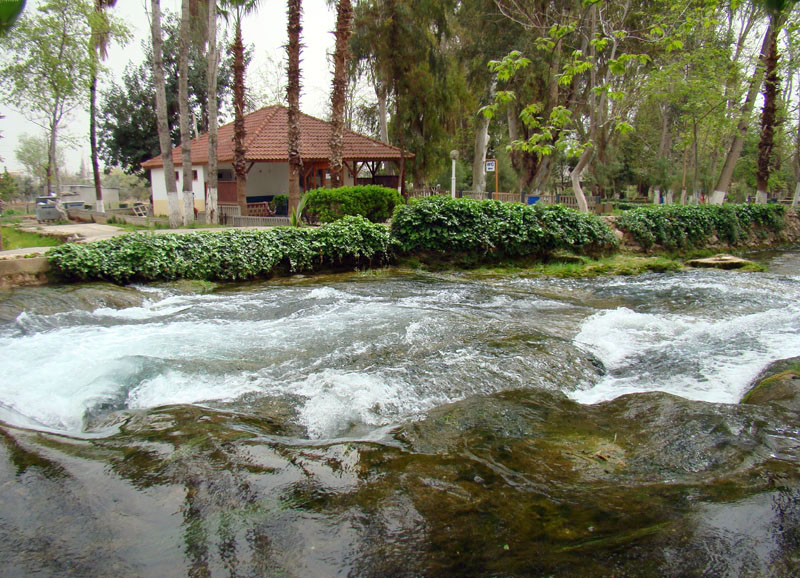

== Lower Düden Waterfall ==
At the Lower Düden Waterfall (36°51′03.6″N 30°47′00.1″E), the Düden River drops 40 metres (131 ft) into the Mediterranean Sea. The waterfall is surrounded by Düden Park, which is open to the public around the clock and free of charge.

== See also ==
- List of waterfalls
- List of waterfalls in Turkey
