= Palo Corona Ranch =

Historic Carmel Valley ranch

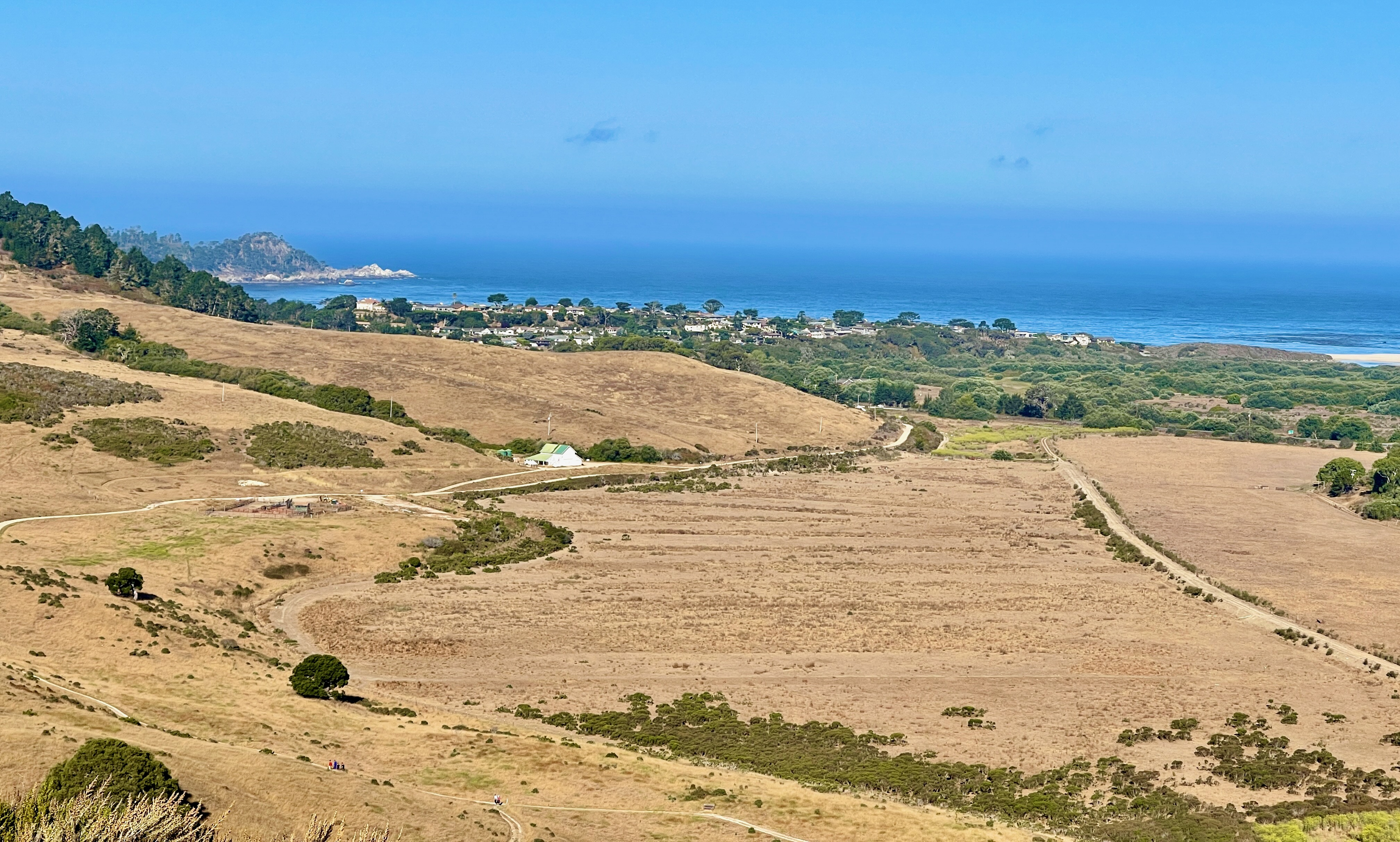
- Palo Corona Ranch looking west from Palo Corona Regional Park in 2022

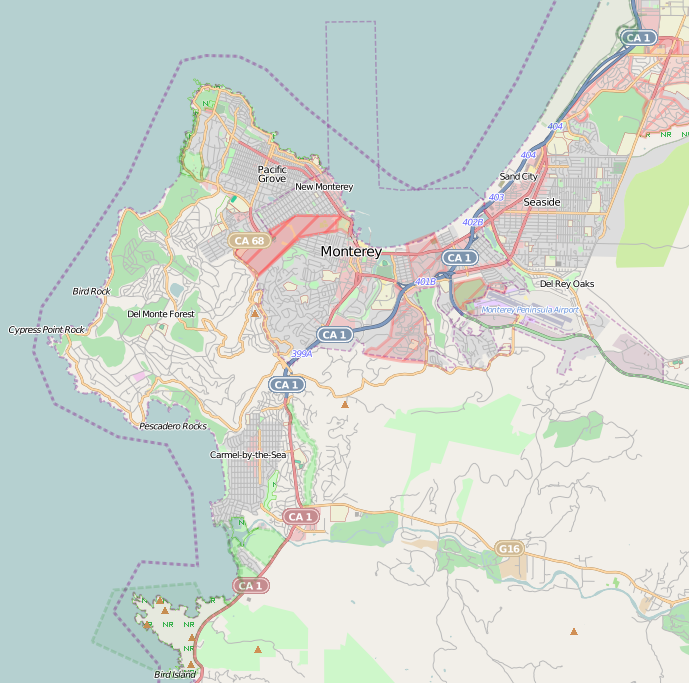
- Location within Monterey Peninsula
- Location: Monterey County, US
- Nearest city: Carmel, California
- Coordinates: 36°31′58″N 121°54′26″W
- Area: 4,500 acres (18 km^{2})
- Established: 1927, May, 2002
- Governing body: Monterey Peninsula Regional Park District

The 4,500 acres (1,800 ha) Palo Corona Ranch, also known as Fish Ranch, was once a private ranch located on the northern end of Big Sur, California, between Garrapata State Park to the west, Carmel Valley on the north, and Santa Lucia Preserve to the east. The ranch is now owned by Monterey Peninsula Regional Park District (MPRPD) In 2002, the Big Sur Land Trust and The Nature Conservancy acquired the land and transferred ownership to MPRPD in 2004, which created the Palo Corona Regional Park. Key habitat and resources include coastal grasslands and woodland, ponds, and perennial creeks.

== History ==
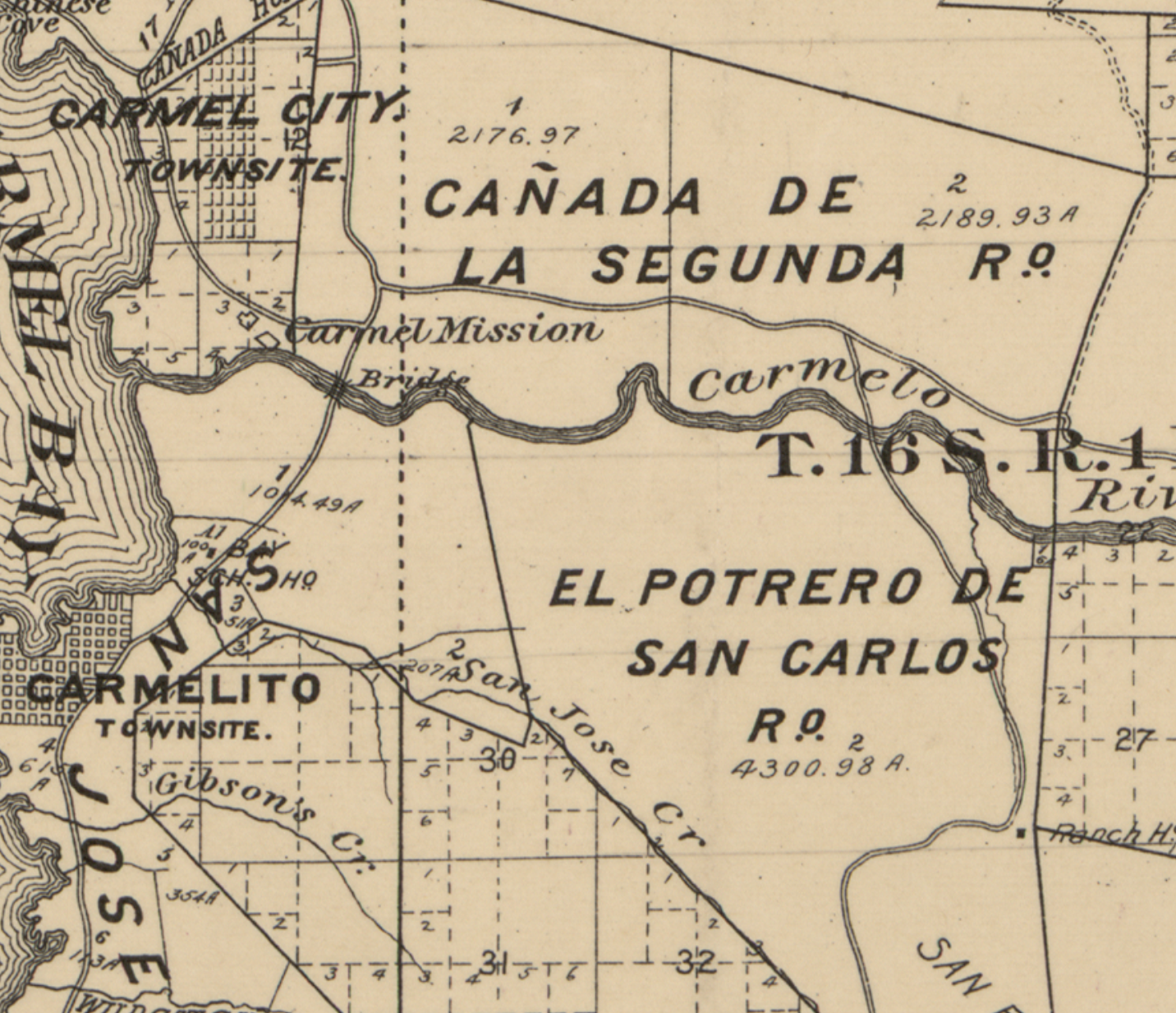
Map of Monterey County, showing Rancho Potrero de San Carlos and San José y Sur Chiquito areas

In 1927, Tom Oliver's wife sold the ranch to Sidney Fish after her husband's death in 1925. The ranch was part of the Rancho San José y Sur Chiquito Mexican land grant to the west, with some inland areas within the Rancho Potrero de San Carlos land grant.

In 1930, Charles Lindbergh and his wife Anne Morrow Lindbergh stayed at the ranch as guests while on an extended honeymoon, and Lindbergh flew a glider from a ridge at the ranch. Eight men towed the glider to the ridge where he soared over the countryside for 10 minutes and brought the plane down 3 miles below the Highlands Inn.

In September 1996, Craig McCaw bought the Palo Corona Ranch, which had grown to 4,500 acres (1,800 ha) for about $10 million. At that time, Fish Ranch stretched southeast about 11 miles (18 km) along the Carmel River south to the Los Padres National Forest.

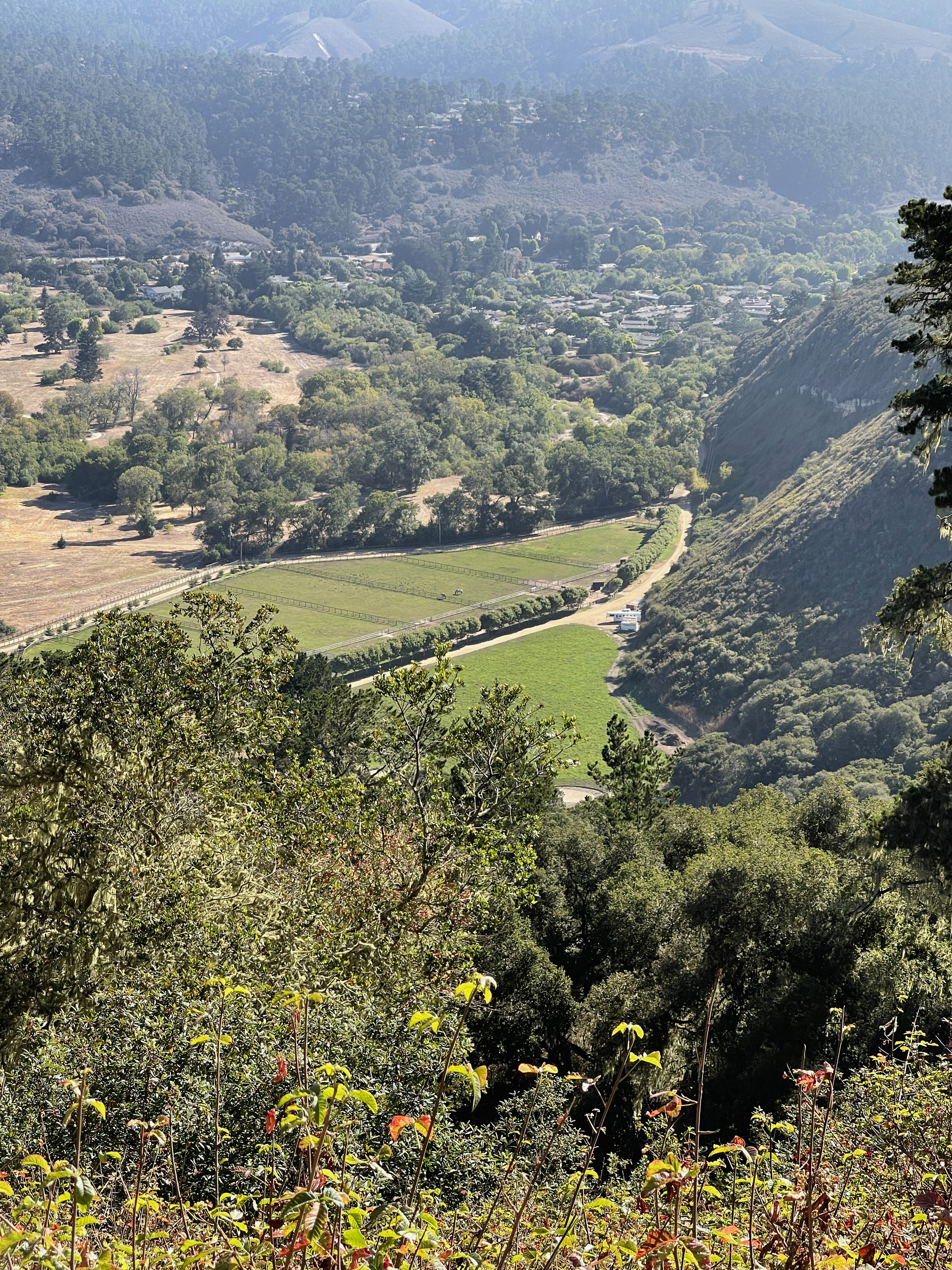
Palo Corona Regional Park looking east

Environmentalists were concerned that the Palo Corona Ranch would be converted to an estate-type development like Rancho San Carlos, now Santa Lucia Preserve. In May 2002, The Nature Conservancy and the Big Sur Land Trust, joined together, and bought the Palo Corona Ranch from McCaw for $37 million. Their plan was to sell it to the state of California and to a regional park district.

In 2004, the Monterey Peninsula Regional Park District (MPRPD) purchased the remaining 2,088 acres (845 ha) middle portion of the Palo Corona Ranch from The Nature Conservancy and the Big Sur Land Trust for the appraised value of $10.2 million. Once finalized in 2004, Palo Corona Ranch became the largest land conservation in Monterey County and one of the most significant due to its size and habitat. The acreage was then divided between the California Department of Fish and Wildlife and MPRPD for protection. The Palo Corona Regional Park was created from the northern 4,350 acres (1,760 ha). In 2016, MPRPD acquired 140 acres (57 ha) of the Rancho Caňada Country Club and golf course in Carmel Valley, which provides public access to the Palo Corona Regional Park.
