= Las Garzas =

Las Garzas may refer to:

- Las Garzas, Argentina, a town in General Obligado Department, Santa Fe Province
- Las Garzas, Chile, a town in Cardenal Caro Province
- Las Garzas Creek (Carmel River tributary), a creek in California, United States
