= Palo Corona Regional Park =

Public recreational area

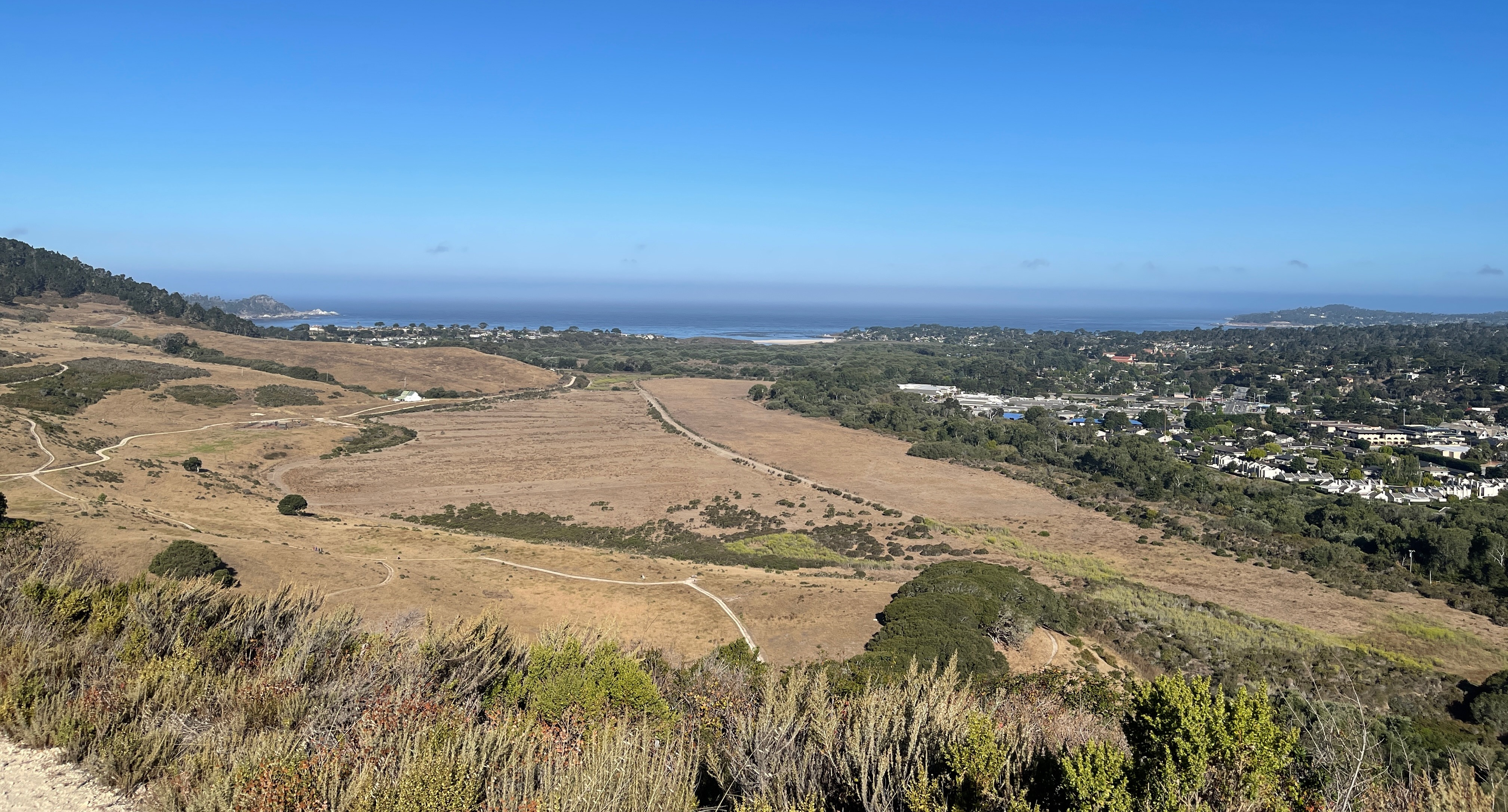
- Palo Corona Regional Park looking west out of Inspiration Point

- Location within California Location within the United States
- Location: Santa Lucia Mountains, Monterey County, USA
- Nearest city: Carmel, California
- Coordinates: 36°25′18″N 121°54′26″W
- Area: 4,500 acres (18 km^{2})
- Established: 2004
- Governing body: Monterey Peninsula Regional Park District

The Palo Corona Regional Park is a 4,500 acres (1,800 ha) park owned by the Monterey Peninsula Regional Park District on land east of Big Sur Coast Highway and Garrapata State Park in California. The 9,898 acres (4,006 ha) property stretches southeast about 11 miles (18 km) from the near the Carmel River State Beach to the Los Padres National Forest. The park is long from north to south, bordered on the northwest by Highway 1 and across from Carmel River State Beach. It wraps around Point Lobos Ranch and abuts Santa Lucia Preserve to the east. In the middle, it is sandwiched by Mitteldorf Preserve and Garrapata State Park. Its southern border abuts Joshua Creek Canyon Ecological Reserve. Environmental interests were concerned that it would be converted to an estate-type development like that done for Rancho San Carlos (renamed as the Santa Lucia Preserve). In May 2002, the Big Sur Land trust and The Nature Conservancy joined to buy the Ranch. Overall, the park directly and indirectly connects nine conservation properties preserved for their biological, recreation and scenic values. The area includes the former Rancho Caňada Country Club and golf course in Carmel Valley.

== Back country range ==
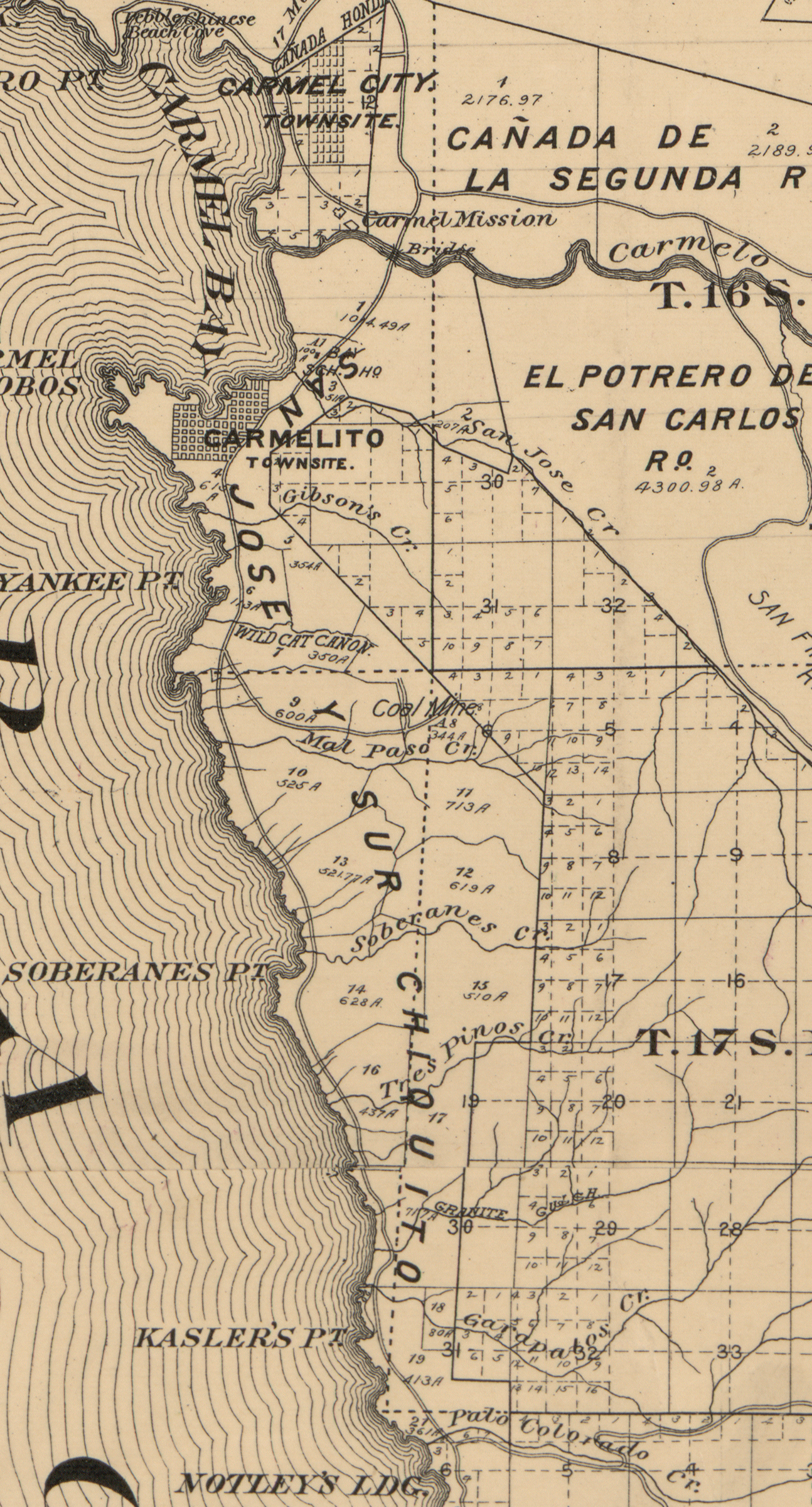
1898 map illustrating the legal boundaries of Rancho San Jose y Sur Chiquito including the mouth of the Carmel River.

The southern "Back Country" range of 5,500 acres (2,226 ha) was sold to the California Department of Fish and Game, which added it the existing 640 acres (260 ha) Joshua Creek Canyon Ecological Reserve. It is protected in perpetuity for public conservation and parkland. The Monterey Peninsula Regional Park District used the northern 4,350 acres (1,760 ha) to create the Palo Corona Regional Park. Due to budget constraints and right-of-way limitations, the district was only able to open the 681 acres (276 ha) front parcel to the public, and only on a limited basis. As of May 2018, access is restricted on a limited permit system. Due to a limited right-of-way and limitations imposed by the California Coastal Commission, only 21 access permits are available daily, 13 for the Highway 1 entrance, and eight permits at the entrance from the South Bank Trail south of the Carmel River. Visitors must apply at least two weekdays in advance.

== Front country range ==
The "front range" portion of the ranch includes the former Rancho Caňada Country Club and the land near the Carmel River State Beach and Point Lobos. The land near the beach was originally part of Rancho San Jose y Sur Chiquito. José Castro gained title to the Rancho in 1849. The land changed hands several times under sometimes mysterious circumstances. The rancho was the subject of multiple conflicting legal claims over many years. Joseph W. Gregg bought 1,000 acres (400 ha) north of San Jose Creek from others. But Castro's heirs and successors invalidated his ownership when they gained clear title to the land on December 24, 1885. President Grover Cleveland signed the land patent on May 4, 1888, 35 years after Castro filed his original claim with the court.

== Purchase ==
Craig McCaw bought it and seven other properties. In 2004, the Palo Corona Ranch, formerly known as the Fish Ranch, was listed for $55 million. Park district and the DPR joined to purchase the remaining 2,088 acres (845 ha) middle portion of the ranch from The Nature Conservancy and the Big Sur Land Trust for the appraised value of $10.2 million. The non-profits bought land from telecommunications millionaire Craig McCaw. They paid $32 million, $8 million less than the asking price. The land consists of coastal grasslands and woodland, ponds, and perennial creeks.
