= Las Garzas Creek (Carmel River tributary) =

Stream in Monterey County, California

Las Garzas Creek Arroyo de las Garzas
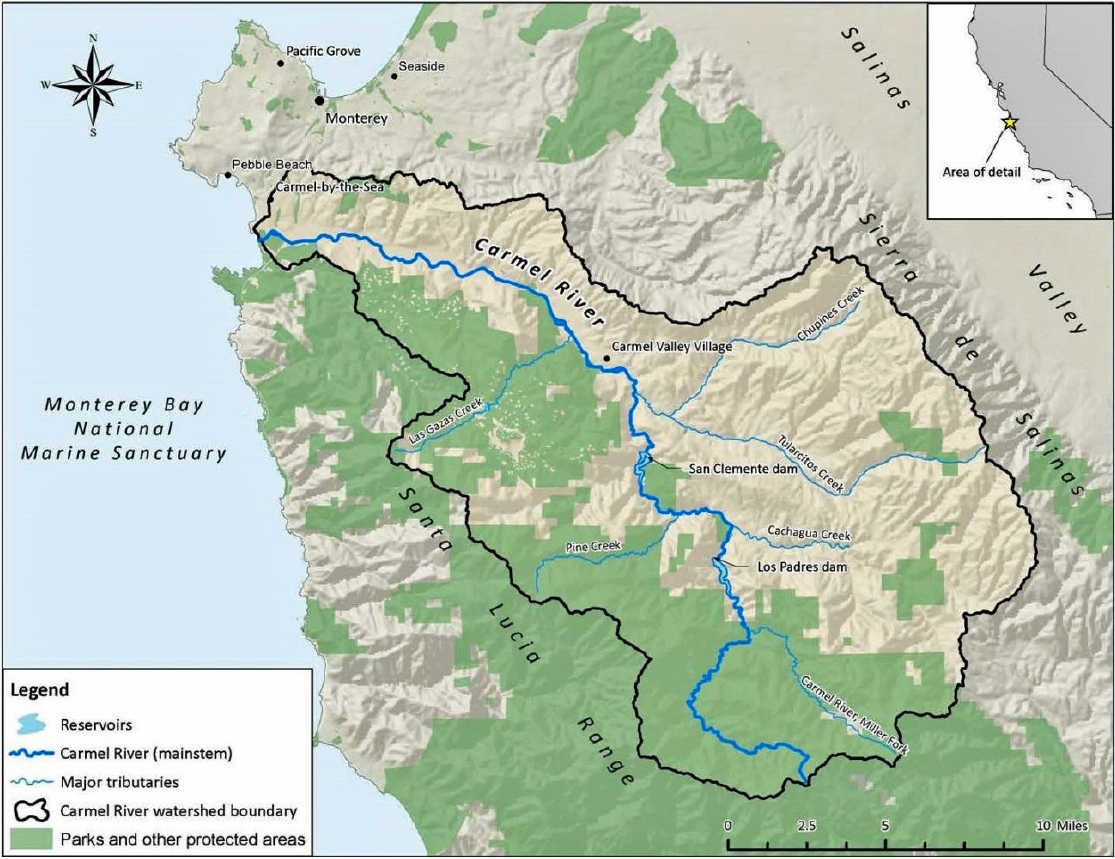
- Carmel River Watershed Map with major tributaries, National Marine Fisheries Service 2013

- Location of the mouth of Las Garzas Creek in Carmel Valley, California

Location
- Country: United States
- State: California
- Region: Monterey County
- Municipality: Carmel Valley, California

Physical characteristics
- Source: Southern flank of Patriarch Ridge, on the northeastern slope of the Santa Lucia Range
  - coordinates: 36°26′20″N 121°51′17″W
  - elevation: 2,814 ft (858 m)
- Mouth: Confluence with the Carmel River
  - location: Carmel Valley, California
  - coordinates: 36°29′32″N 121°45′04″W
  - elevation: 217 ft (66 m)

Basin features
- Tributaries
  - right: Salsipuedes Creek, Cienega Creek

Las Garzas Creek is a 9.0-mile-long (14.5 km) northeastward-flowing stream, the lowermost major tributary of the Carmel River. It originates about 1.2 miles (1.9 km) southeast of Palo Corona summit on a saddle between Patriarch Ridge and an unnamed peak to its south. This saddle is part of the east–west watershed divide of the northern Santa Lucia Range. The creek flows almost entirely through the Santa Lucia Preserve to its confluence with the Carmel River in Carmel Valley, Monterey County, California.

== History ==
Las Garzas Creek was historically Arroyo de Las Garzas, Spanish for "place of the herons". It reaches the Carmel River at the historic Rancho Potrero de San Carlos given in 1837 by Governor Juan B. Alvarado to Fructuoso del Real, a Native American from the Mission San Carlos. In 1851 it was acquired by Bradley Varnum Sargent and his brothers. In 1920, New Yorker George Gordon Moore acquired it, and renamed it the 20,000 acre San Carlos Ranch. Arthur C. Oppenheimer bought it in foreclosure in the early 1930s and made it into a cattle ranch, then in 1990 it was acquired by the Pacific Union Company which changed the name back to "Rancho San Carlos".

== Watershed ==
The Las Garzas Creek watershed drains 13.2 square miles (34 km^{2}). Its source is at 2,814 feet (858 m) elevation east of the watershed divide just south of Patriarch Ridge on the eastern edge of Joshua Creek Canyon Ecological Reserve in the northern Santa Lucia Range. The creek flows east into and through the Santa Lucia Preserve. After receiving the waters of Salsipuedes Creek it reaches San Francisquito Flat, a large marshy area which includes an impounded 17-acre reservoir known as Moore's Lake (constructed in the 1920s and named for former owner George Gordon Moore). Here it receives flows from Cienega Creek. Next, the creek passes beneath Robinson Canyon Road and proceeds northeast through a canyon, reaching the Carmel River in Carmel Valley, California. Las Garzas Creek is one of three Carmel River subwatersheds (Pine, Garzas, and Black Rock/San Clemente creeks) which produce 27% of the annual Carmel flow, although they compose only 15% of the Carmel watershed area.

== Ecology ==
Steelhead trout (Onchorhynchus mykiss) spawn and rear in Las Garzas Creek, although California Department of Fish and Wildlife staff indicated that "The major factors limiting steelhead production are inadequate sized gravels for spawning and low stream flows… The low stream flows during the summer could be supplemented with flow releases from Moore Lake, especially later in the summer when Las Garzas Creek becomes intermittent" and access as far upstream as Robinson Canyon Road is blocked by boulder cascades.

== See also ==
- Santa Lucia Preserve
- Santa Lucia Range
