= Mill Creek Redwood Preserve =

Protected area in Big Sur, California

- Location within California Location within the United States
- Location: Palo Colorado Canyon, Monterey County, USA
- Nearest city: Carmel, California
- Coordinates: 36°22′07″N 121°50′18.9″W
- Area: 1,534 acres (6.21 km^{2})
- Established: 2000
- Governing body: Monterey Peninsula Regional Park District
- Website: Mill Creek Redwood Preserve

The 1,534 acres (621 ha) Mill Creek Redwood Preserve is located in Big Sur, California, 6.8 miles (10.9 km) from Highway 1 on Palo Colorado Road. The park is owned by the Monterey Peninsula Regional Park District. To alleviate resistance by residents of Palo Colorado Canyon who were concerned about the impact of traffic on the narrow, one-lane road, access was limited to six visitors per day who must obtain a permit in advance from the district. The preserve was pieced together from several large properties between 1988 and 2000 at a cost of $2 million. When open, it is only accessible via trail from the road. The preserve was severely damaged by the Soberanes fire and is closed indefinitely.

== History ==
The land to the south of Palo Colorado Canyon was formerly owned by Charles Henry Bixby, namesake of the Bixby Creek Bridge. In 1906, when the available commercial timber was depleted, Bixby sold his land to the Monterey Lime Company. Lime was in demand as an ingredient in concrete to help re-build San Francisco following the 1906 San Francisco earthquake. The company built a 3 miles (4.8 km) aerial tram to transport the limestone from Long Ridge to Bixby's Landing, a small community that grew up around the Bixby Homestead. Eventually, the exhaustion of local fuel, wood and high operating costs closed the kilns in 1910. The tram remained in business for a time to off and on-load supplies for the community from schooners. Activity picked up in 1917 when Pacific Grove's T. A. Work and A. W. Furlong built and operated a logging mill further up the canyon in the preserve. Local Japanese from the peninsula were hired, a camp was constructed, and several steam-donkeys were brought in from San Francisco. Most of the lumber was hoisted up out of the canyon by cables and down what is now Palo Colorado Canyon Road by oxen.

The mill was closed in 1935 after the marketable timber was cut. Logging was renewed in 1946 when Charles Vander Ploeg built a mill in Beartrap Canyon. This mill was short-lived when a human-caused fire in 1949 destroyed the mill and killed two loggers. Evidence suggests that the redwood logging at that time was for fence posts. Logging once again found its way into the preserve for a few years in the early ‘60's. This time the trees were cut in the Turner Creek drainage. This area is in the very upper reach of the canyon and the logging was sporadic and selective. By 1986 the Humboldt County-based Philo Lumber Company owned the land. Their plan to harvest over a million board feet of redwood and then build upscale residences in the area was only derailed by the savings and loan crisis, when the land was seized by federal financial regulators. After two years of negotiations the Federal Land Bank sold the property to the Big Sur Land Trust, which in turn sold it to the Monterey Peninsula Regional Park District in 1988.

== Trails ==
The district joined the seized land with three adjacent properties to form the Mill Creek Redwood Preserve. The park district trail boss Chris Reed worked with AmeriCorps volunteers and prison crews to build a 2.75 miles (4.43 km) trail from Palo Colorado Road to an overlook, which was completed over eight years. The trail was opened on June 30, 2006. An 9 miles (14 km) loop trail is also planned.

== Limited access ==
Responding to concerns of canyon residents about traffic on narrow Palo Colorado Road, the county agreed to limit access to six permits per day. When open, visitors are required to obtain a permit in advance from the Monterey Peninsula Regional Park District. The trail head is located 6.8 miles (10.9 km) inland on Palo Colorado Road.

== Closure ==
The preserve was closed when the Soberanes Fire was started by campers in Garrapata Canyon who left a fire untended on July 22, 2016. The fire burned through Palo Colorado Canyon in less than two days, destroying 57 homes and 11 outbuildings in the Garrapata and Palo Colorado Canyon areas. The following winter Rocky Creek washed out the Palo Colorado road, and additional slides and slip outs closed the road. Monterey County states that it does not have the funds to repair the road, preventing visitors from accessing the park. The preserve was also severely damaged by the fire and is closed indefinitely.
