= Mitteldorf Preserve =

- Location within California Location within the United States
- Location: Santa Lucia Mountains, Monterey County, USA
- Nearest city: Carmel, California
- Coordinates: 36°22′07″N 121°50′18.9″W
- Area: 1,043 acres (4.22 km^{2})
- Established: February, 1990
- Governing body: Big Sur Land Trust

The 1,043 acres (422 ha) Mitteldorf Preserve in Big Sur, California, is owned by to the Big Sur Land Trust. It is located between Joshua Creek Canyon Ecological Reserve to the south, Palo Corona Regional Park on the north, and Santa Lucia Preserve to the east. It is only accessible through the Santa Lucia Preserve, a private, gated, community of about 300 homes on 20,000 acres (8,100 ha) in Carmel Valley, California.

Arthur Mitteldorf, an inventor and former president and chief executive of Spex Industries and his wife Harriet searched for property containing a pristine stand of Redwood trees and donated the funds to purchase the property to the trust in 1990. Mitteldorf conserves the largest Redwood trees in Monterey County. It also protects madrone, oak woodland, coastal chaparral, and grassland habitats. Williams Canyon Road through the preserve provides emergency access first responders. The road is an essential road for the California Department of Forestry Palo Corona Fuels Reduction Project. The trust began developing infrastructure for a nature camp and research program when the Soberanes Fire destroyed the barn and burned much of the habitat. Public access is allowed by reservation only.

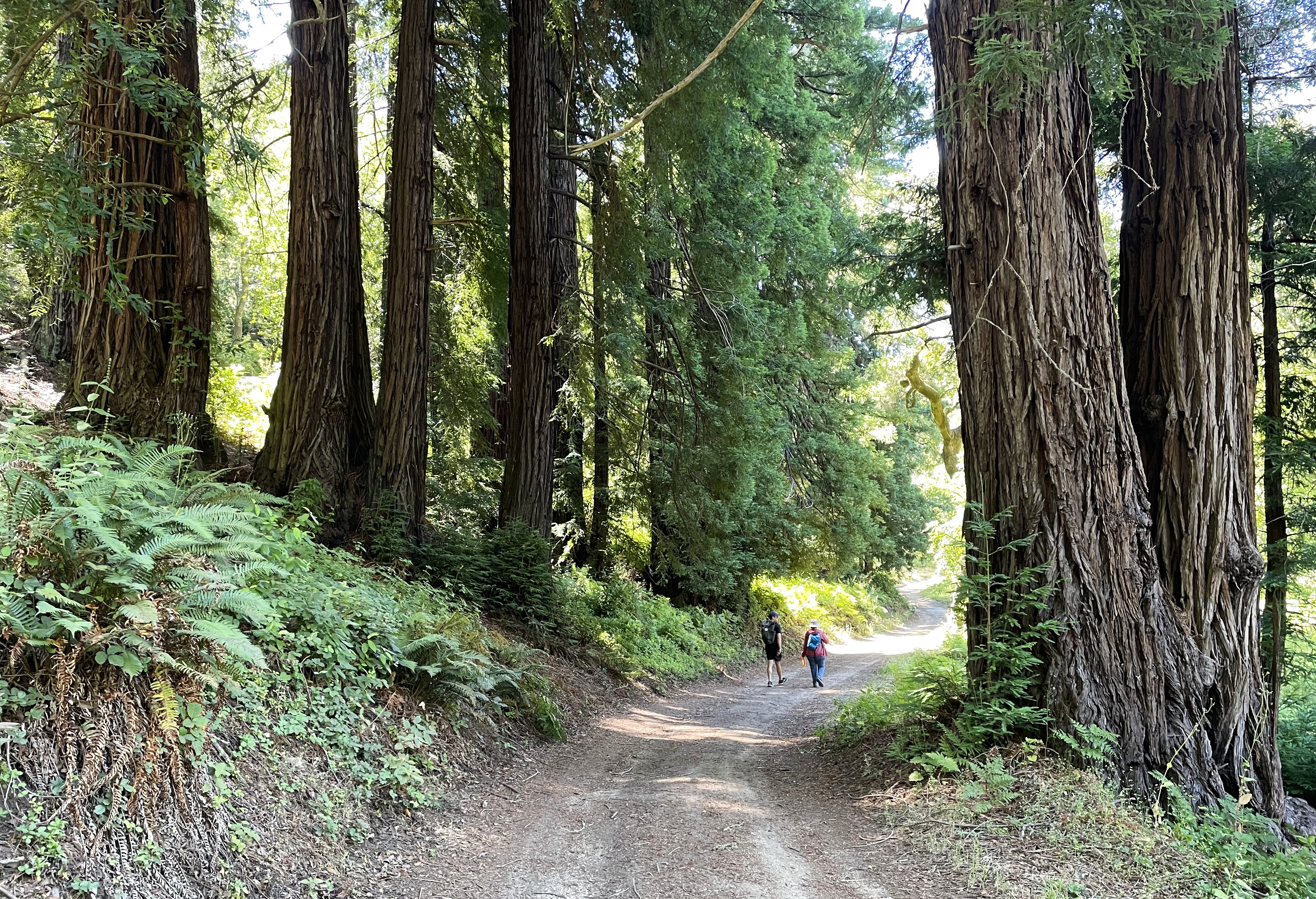

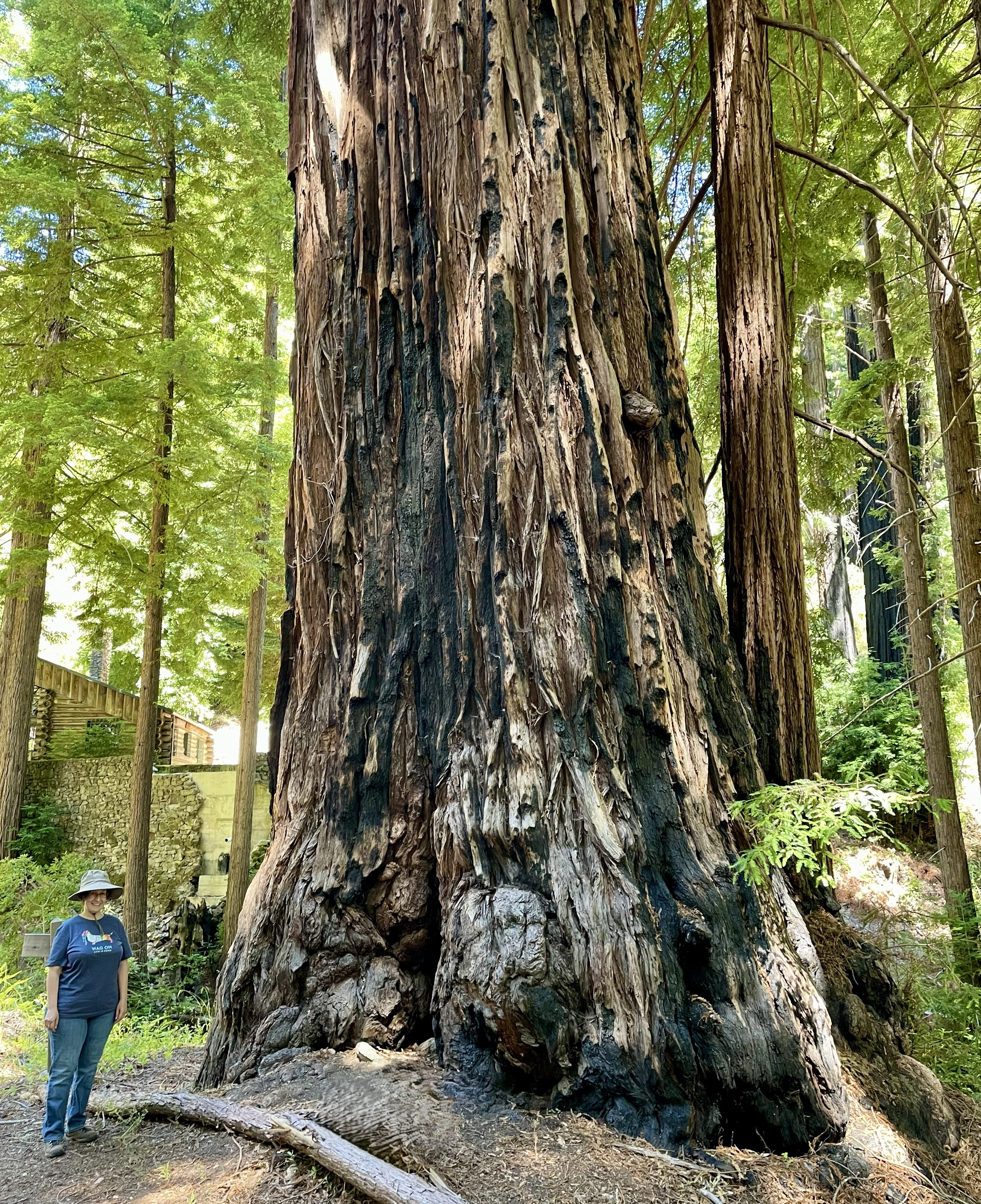
