= Joshua Creek Canyon Ecological Reserve =

Protected area in California, United States

- Location within California Location within the United States
- Location: Santa Lucia Mountains, Monterey County, USA
- Nearest city: Carmel, California
- Coordinates: 36°25′18″N 121°54′26″W
- Area: 5,887.31 acres (23.8251 km^{2})
- Established: February, 1990
- Governing body: California Department of Fish and Wildlife

The 5,887.31 acres (2,382.51 ha) Joshua Creek Canyon Ecological Reserve in Big Sur, California, is owned by to the California Department of Fish and Wildlife. It is located between Big Sur Coast Highway to the west, Palo Corona Regional Park and Mitteldorf Preserve on the north, and Santa Lucia Preserve and U.S. Forest Service land to the east. It is only accessible through the Santa Lucia Preserve, a private, gated, community of about 300 homes on 20,000 acres (8,100 ha) in Carmel Valley, California.

The Big Sur Land Trust purchased the 9,898 acres (4,006 ha) Palo Corona Ranch in 2002 and 2004 for $32 million from Craig McCaw. The southern portion comprising 4,300 acres (1,740 ha) was used to form the Joshua Creek Canyon Ecological Reserve. All ecological reserves are maintained for the primary purpose of developing a statewide program for protection of rare, threatened, or endangered native plants, wildlife, aquatic organisms, and specialized terrestrial or aquatic habitat types. Visitors are required to obtain "Daily or Annual Lands Pass for Authorized Uses other than Hunting".
