= K31OL-D =

Television station in Salinas, California

- Salinas, California; United States
- Channels: Digital: 31 (UHF); Virtual: 38
- Branding: MCAET TV

Programming
- Subchannels: 38.1: MCAET TV

Ownership
- Owner: Monterey County Superintendent of Schools

History
- First air date: 1969
- Former call signs: K83BU (1969–1971); K56AA (1971–2007); K38JP(-D) (2007–2019)
- Former channel numbers: Analog: 83 (1969–1971), 56 (1971–2007), 38 (2007–2010); Digital: 38 (2010–2019)

Technical information
- Licensing authority: FCC
- Facility ID: 43593
- ERP: 15 kW
- Transmitter coordinates: 36°32′17.8″N 121°37′34.7″W

Links
- Public license information: LMS
- Website: mcaet.org

K31OL-D (channel 38) is a low-power television station in Salinas, California, United States. It is owned by the Monterey County Office of Education. The main subchannel, MCAET TV, broadcasts programs of local interest and productions from the Media Center for Art, Education and Technology.

== History ==
=== As a translator ===
The Monterey County Superintendent of Schools began building a network of translators in the early 1960s to rebroadcast public television from KQED in San Francisco, with the first, channel 72 from Mount Toro, going on air in September 1964. The southernmost translator in the multi-county network, at Pismo Heights, went into service in 1966, and together with translators of Los Angeles station KCET as far north as Santa Maria, ensured educational television coverage up and down the California coast; the Monterey County network formed the largest educational television translator network in the United States at the time.

In 1967, the Monterey County Superintendent of Schools filed an application with the Federal Communications Commission to build a new translator on channel 83. This was licensed as K83BU in March 1969. Two years later, the FCC approved K83BU to move from channel 83 to channel 56 as K56AA.

By the mid-1970s, K83BU had switched its program source from KQED to KTEH in San Jose. By this time, the Monterey County superintendent of schools was beginning to pursue the concept of a full-service, higher-power television license, but it initially could not obtain the grant funding necessary to build the facility. A construction permit was issued for KHIJ in 1978, but the school board struggled to purchase needed equipment due to high inflation, and the passage of Proposition 13 killed the project.

K56AA returned to being a KQED translator by 1991. By that point, the district had begun the provision of instructional programming, preempting KTEH's daytime programming on local cable systems.

=== MCAET TV ===
K56AA moved to channel 38 as K38JP in 2007, due to the removal of channels 52 to 69 from television use, and converted to digital as K38JP-D in 2010. Initially, Monterey County programming aired as subchannel 38.2, with subchannel 38.1 leased to ESNE TV, a sister to Spanish-language Catholic radio network ESNE Radio. The two services have since switched positions.

In 2019, the station was repacked and moved to channel 31, retaining 38 as its virtual channel.

== Subchannels ==
Subchannels of K31OL-D
Channel	Res.	Short name	Programming
38.1	720p	MCAET	MCAET TV
