= River Fire (2020) =

2020 wildfire in Central California

- Part of the August 2020 California lightning siege
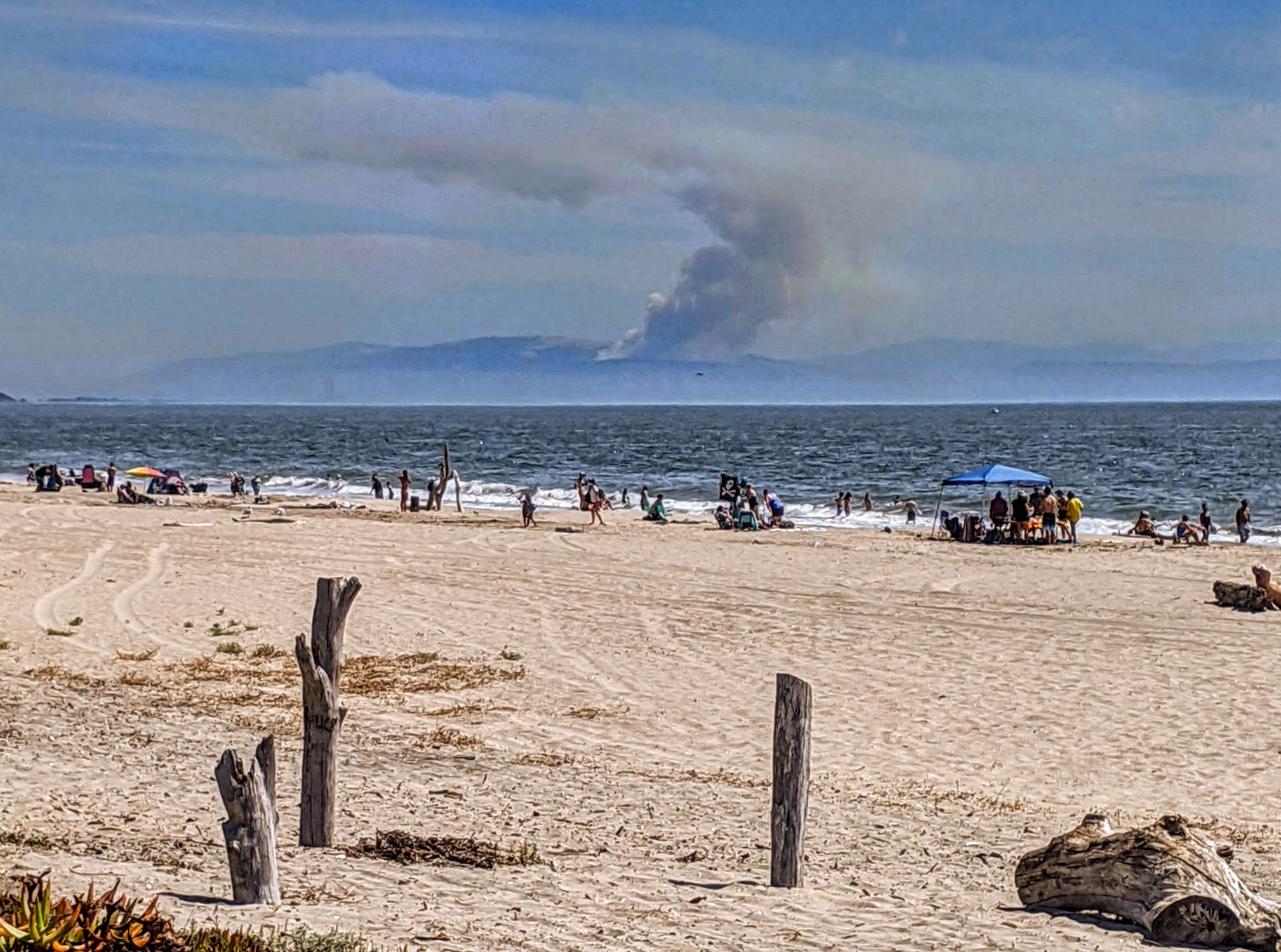
- The River Fire smoke plume as seen from the beach at Aptos the day it started
- Date: August 16, 2020 –; September 4, 2020

Statistics
- Burned area: 48,088 acres (19,461 ha)

Impacts
- Injuries: 4
- Structures lost: 30

The River Fire was a wildfire that broke out from a lightning storm early on August 16, 2020 in Monterey County, California, south of Salinas, near River Road and Mount Toro. Within its first day, it spread to 2,000 acres and was 10% contained; mandatory evacuations were ordered, while air and ground crews worked the fire.

On August 17, the fire, three miles south of Salinas, spread to 2,800 acres and threatened 1,500 structures; four firefighters were injured.

The fire had burned 4,070 acres by August 18, and as of August 19, the fire had grown to over 10,000 acres. By August 21, over 42,000 acres had burned and the fire was 12% contained. The nearby Carmel Fire was over 5,069 acres and five percent contained.

On September 4, Cal Fire reported that both the River Fire and the Carmel Fire were 100% contained. The River Fire had burned 48,088 acres and the Carmel Fire had burned 6,905 acres; between them, they had destroyed 103 structures and damaged 20.

When a strong atmospheric river winter storm came to the burned area in January, 2021, a mudslide occurred and damaged homes and barns near River Road, and trapped several horses that were later rescued.
