= Glen Deven Ranch =

Coordinates: 36.4011023°N 121.8884317°W

Glen Deven Ranch is an 860 acres (350 ha) property in Big Sur that was given to the Big Sur Land Trust in 2001 by Seeley and Virginia Mudd. Composed of coastal woodlands, coastal river lands, grasslands and wildlife, it is used by the Trust each summer as an outdoor summer camp to teach inner-city youth about coastal ecosystems. The ranch is accessible via Highway 1 east on Palo Colorado Road, to Garrapatos Road. The ranch's roads also offer residents of Palo Colorado Canyon an emergency exit during a flood or fire.

Dr. Mudd and his wife lived on the property for 30 years. They decided to donate the land when she learned she was terminally ill with cancer in 1998. After her husband passed in September 2000, the property became part of the Big Sur Land Trust in April 2001. The Mudd's former home, an artist's studio, and a pool have been retained on the property. The Mudds stipulated in their bequest that the property should be used to serve artists. To reduce fire danger, the Trust is removing non-native, highly-flammable Eucalyptus trees from the property. The ranch leases 30 acres (12 ha) of pasture to the Corral de Tierra Cattle Company.

In 2016, Jeannette Tuitele-Lewis, President and CEO of the Big Sur Land Trust, said that the Mudds bequeathed the property to the Trust because they wanted to both conserve and "share the landscape with people." On November 29, 2016, the ranch was the site of a special dinner prepared by Outstanding in the Field restaurateur Jim Denevan. The company hosts special events at various locations around the world, seeking to connect "local chefs, farmers, and artisans" to serve a one-time meal in each location. Individuals flew in from Chicago and drove to the site from Los Angeles and other distant points. The meal featured dates from a farm in Thermal, California; pork from the Klingman Ranch in Utah; apples from Devoto Orchards in Sonoma County, California, beef from the Corral de Tierra Cattle Company, and black code salad from TwoXSea in San Francisco. Other than special invitation-only events, access is restricted to camp attendees and members of the Trust.
