= Las Garzas, Chile =

Village in Cardenal Caro Province, Chile

Coordinates: 37°37′S 72°13′W

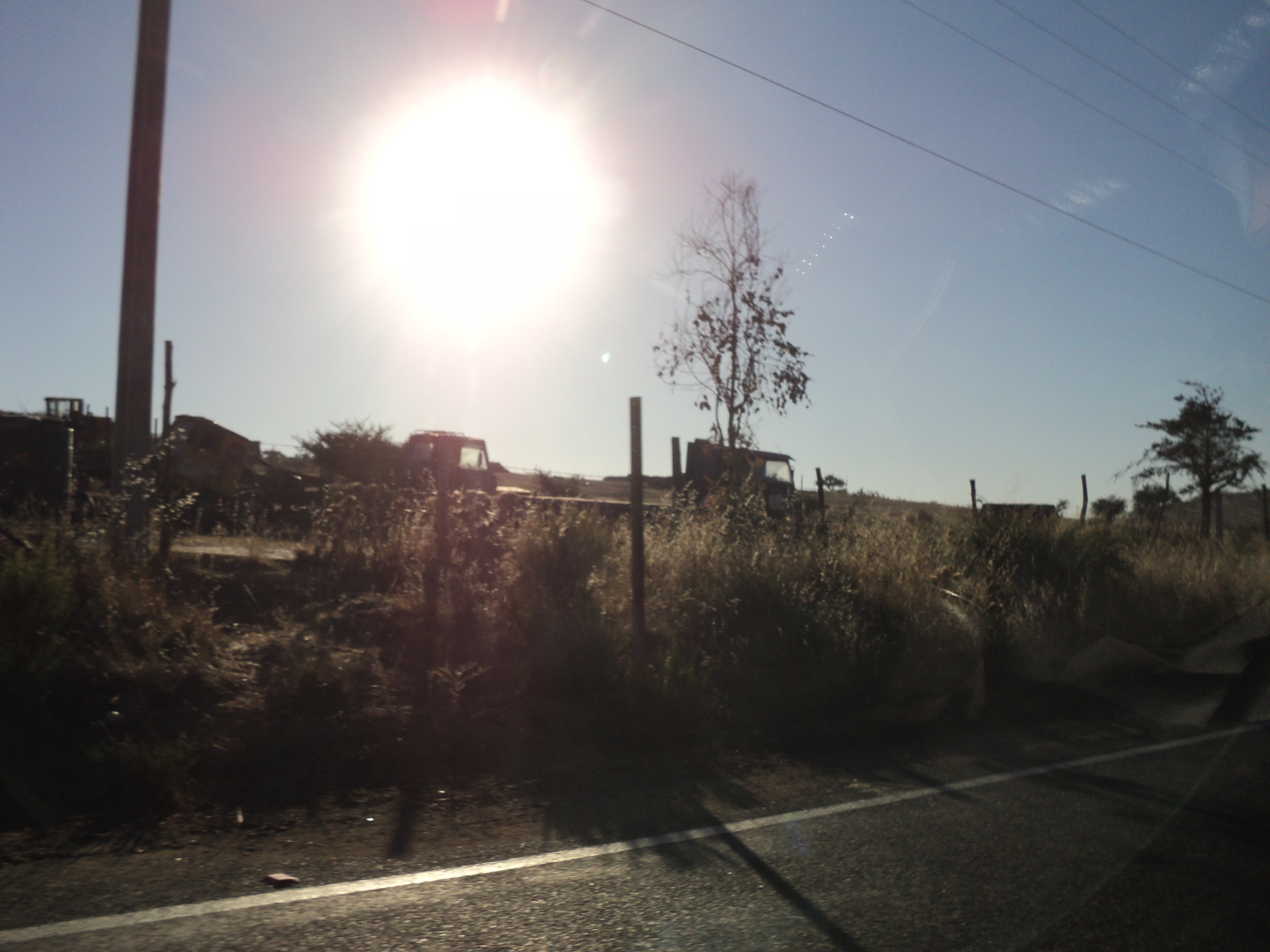
Las Garzas in March 2011.

Las Garzas is a village located in Marchigue, Cardenal Caro Province, Chile, near Pichilemu. It was formerly a farm.
