= Monterey Peninsula Regional Park District =

Recreation district in California, United States

- Founded: 1972 (54 years ago)
- Type: Independent special district
- Headquarters: Carmel, California, United States
- Region served: California Central Coast
- Method: Mello-Roos Community Facilities District
- Revenue: US$7.1 million (2022)
- Endowment: US$19,9 million (2022)
- Employees: 19
- Website: mprpd.org

The Monterey Peninsula Regional Park District is an independent special recreation district with offices in Carmel, Monterey County, California. It was formed in 1972 and serves much of northern Monterey County. For the benefit of the general public, it serves to safeguard and preserve parks and open space. The District has preserved more than 20,000 acres (8,100 ha) of park and open space on the Monterey Peninsula. It is not an agency of Monterey County or of any of the local municipalities.

== Funding ==
The district collects 1/2% of the property tax collected within the District. For every $100,000 of property value, the District receives approximately $5.00 for open space acquisition and operations. It also formed in 2004 a Community Facilities District under the Mello-Roos Community Facilities Act of 1982. In 2016, voters renewed the district and approved a Special Tax Lien of $25.26 per single family dwelling equivalent each year. In 2022, expenses are projected to be $9,729,259 based on revenue of $7,143,200. The district has a balance of $19,986,224.

== Governance ==
It is governed by a five-member Board of Directors elected in even years. There are five wards from which board members are elected that generally include Marina; Seaside; Del Ray Oaks and portions of Sand City and Monterey; Pacific Grove, Pebble Beach, and Monterey; Carmel, Pebble Beach, Carmel Valley, Cachagua, Carmel Highlands, and Big Sur.

== Programs ==
It offers a variety of programs at its various parks, including environmental education and outdoor related programs such as geocaching, stargazing, hiking, geology, wildlife watching, art and writing, gardening, and fire safety.

== Parks ==
It owns ten parks within Monterey County.

- Garland Ranch Regional Park is a 3,464 acres (1,402 ha) park in Carmel Valley that was the district's first land acquisition. It was purchased in 1975 from William Garland II for $1.1 million along with a $250,000 gift from Garland. After Garland died on May 10, 1975, the park district named the park after him.
- Cachagua Community Park is a 14 acres (6 ha) park located in the Cachagua area of Carmel Valley.
- Eolian Dunes Preserve is a 26 acres (11 ha) property in Seaside acquired in 1995.
- Frog Pond Wetland Preserve is a 17 acres (7 ha) refuge for resident and migratory wildlife alongside Highway 218 in Del Rey Oaks, California.
- Joyce Stevens Monterey Pine Preserve is a 851 acres (344 ha) park east of the City of Monterey and adjacent to and north of Monterey County's Jacks Peak Park. It was purchased from the Pebble Beach Company for $7.45 million on December 4, 2014.
- Locke-Paddon Wetland Community Park is a 12 acres (5 ha) parcel in Marina that was acquired by the district in 1986. It is located off Reservation Road and Highway 1, near the Marina Library.
- Marina Dunes Preserve is a 62 acres (25 ha) park that was purchased by the district in 1988.
- Mill Creek Redwood Preserve is a 1,386 acres (561 ha) parcel including a Big Sur coastal redwood canyon land. It was purchased by the Big Sur Land Trust for $2 million which sold it to the district in 1988.
- Palo Corona Regional Park is a 4,300 acres (1,740 ha) park that was purchased in 2004 from the Whisler and Wilson Family Trust by the Big Sur Land Trust for $4.25 million. It is located east of Point Lobos.
- Laguna Grande Regional Park is a 35 acres (14 ha) park on the border of Monterey and Seaside, California. The District is a member of the Laguna Grande Regional Park Joint Powers Agency organized in 1976 that is responsible for managing Laguna Grande Park with those two cities. The heavily wooded park contains Laguna Del Rey, a 12 acres (4.9 ha) fresh water lake and marsh, and is located on the south side of Canyon Del Rey Boulevard and between Del Monte Avenue and Fremont St. The park is one of the top birding destinations on the Central Coast and has been plagued by ongoing issues of homeless encampments. In 2014, three dead bodies were found within the park in less than a year.
