= Mount Toro (Monterey County, California) =

Mountain in California, United States

- Location within California Location within the United States

Highest point
- Elevation: 3,560 ft (1,090 m)
- Prominence: 1,080 ft (330 m)
- Coordinates: 36°31′34″N 121°35′35″W

Geography
- Location: Monterey County, California, US
- Parent range: Santa Lucia Mountains
- Topo map: Mount Toro

Climbing
- Easiest route: Trail hike

Mount Toro is a mountain peak in the Santa Lucia range in Monterey County, California. It is located within the boundaries of Los Padres National Forest. The name comes from the word "Toro," which in Spanish means "Bull".

The highest point in the area is the Sierra de Salinas mountain range, 3,560 ft (1,090 m) above sea level, ten point six miles (17 km) southeast of Mount Toro and 1,080 ft (330 m) above the surrounding terrain. There are about 16 people per square kilometer around Mount Toro. The land around Mount Toro is mountainous. The nearest town is Salinas, fifteen miles (24 km) north of Mount Toro. The area around Mount Toro is covered with dirt and mud.

Mount Toro is not accessible to the public. In the past, it had been used for winter recreational activities during rare events of snowfall. Magnificent views can be seen of the entire shoreline of Monterey Bay, the Corral de Tierra basin, Monterey, Watsonville, Castroville, Salinas, Santa Rita, Natividad, Chualar, Gonzales, and Soledad with the naked eye. Using a telescope you can see Lick Observatory on Mt. Hamilton, and Mount Diablo and the snow-covered Sierras one hundred and fifty miles (241 km) eastward.

The KPRC-FM, KWAV, KLVM (FM), KION-TV, KOTR-LD and other transmitters are on Mount Toro, located ten miles (16 km) to the south of Salinas. The Monterey County Superintendent of Schools began building a network of K31OL-D translators in the early 1960s to rebroadcast public television from KQED in San Francisco, with the first, channel 72 from Mount Toro, going on air in September 1964.

Dorrance Ranch, having conservation easements with the Big Sur Land Trust is about 10 miles (16 km) south of Salinas and 15 miles (24 km) east/southeast of Monterey in the Sierra de Salinas Mountain Range of Monterey County on Mount Toro's northern ridge. The land has oak savannas, ponds, wetlands, and grasslands, habitat for golden eagle, California red-legged frog, California tiger salamander, burrowing owl, and California condor.

Mount Toro is one of Monterey County's most familiar vistas. John Steinbeck characterized Corral de Tierra as "Pastures of Heaven.”

They climbed stiffly from their seats and stood on the ridge peak and looked down into the Pastures of Heaven. And the air was as golden gauze in the last of the sun. The land below them was plotted in squares of green orchard trees and in squares of yellow grain and in squares of violet earth. From the sturdy farmhouses, set in their gardens, the smoke of the evening fires drifted upward until the hillbreeze swept it cleanly off. Cowbells were softly clashing in the valley; a dog barked so far away that the sound rose up to the travelers in sharp little whispers. Directly below the ridge a band of sheep had gathered under an oak tree against the night. "It's called Las Pasturas del Cielo," the driver said. "They raise good vegetables there good berries and fruit earlier here than any place else. The name means Pastures of Heaven."

— John Steinbeck

The River Fire was a wildfire that broke out from a lightning storm early on August 16, 2020, in Monterey County, south of Salinas, near River Road and Mount Toro. Within its first day, it spread to 2,000 acres (810 ha) and was 10% contained; mandatory evacuations were ordered, while air and ground crews worked the fire.

== Climate ==
The climate is Mediterranean. The average temperature is 16 °C. The warmest month is July, at 26 °C, and the coldest is February, at 8 °C. The average rainfall is 492 millimeters per year. The wettest month is December, with 129 millimeters of rain, and the driest is May, with 1 millimeters.

Mount Toro

Climate chart (precipitation, max. and min. temperature)
J	F	M	A	M	J	J	A	S	O	N	D
62 14 4	75 14 3	71 18 4	40 22 5	1 27 10	2 36 11	1 36 15	2 36 13	2 33 15	25 27 11	82 18 8	129 12 4
- █ Average max. and min. temperatures in °C
- █ Precipitation totals in mm
Imperial conversion
J	F	M	A	M	J	J	A	S	O	N	D
2.4 57 39	3 57 37	2.8 64 39	1.6 72 41	0 81 50	0.1 97 52	0 97 59	0.1 97 55	0.1 91 59	1 81 52	3.2 64 46	5.1 54 39
- █ Average max. and min. temperatures in °F
- █ Precipitation totals in inches

== See also ==
- List of highest points in California by county
