= Ishxenta State Park =

Protected area in California, United States

- Location within California Location within the United States
- Location: Point Lobos area, Monterey County, California, United States
- Nearest city: Carmel
- Coordinates: 36°31′3.7″N 121°56′49.6″W
- Area: 1,315 acres (5.32 km^{2})
- Established: 2003
- Governing body: California State Parks
- Website: Ishxenta State Park Property

Ishxenta State Park is an 1,315-acre (532 ha) California state park in the northern region of Big Sur, California, United States. San Jose Creek on the ranch was the site of an Ohlone village for thousands of years. Europeans first visited the site when the Portolá expedition camped at the site for 10 days in the winter of 1769.

Ishxenta State Park is south of Carmel-by-the-Sea and east of Point Lobos State Reserve. It contains one of the world's largest stands of native Monterey pines, endangered Gowen cypress, and rare maritime chaparral plant communities. Acquired by California State Parks in 2001 as Point Lobos Ranch, it has limited public access.

== History ==
The Ohlone people harvested shellfish including abalone from the waters around Point Lobos. Evidence has been found of seasonal camp sites on the San Jose Creek for about 2,500 years. The Portola Expedition crossed the Carmel River on November 28, 1769, and camped in the vicinity of San Jose Creek. They remained there until December 10.

The natives lived in an Ohlone village in the vicinity named Ichxenta. The villagers were baptized and forcefully required to remain at the nearby Carmel Mission. In about 1770, Spanish Vaqueros from the nearby ran cattle on Point Lobos. The mission was secularized in 1833. Tribe members were decimated by disease, starvation, overwork, and torture.

Governor Juan Alvarado granted two square leagues of land named Rancho San Jose y Sur Chiquito in 1839 to Marcelino Escobar. It was briefly owned in turn by Doňa Maria Josefa de Abrego, who may have held it for her husband, Monterey Alcalde José Abrego. In 1843, Doňa Abrego deeded the land to a group of about 10 soldiers from the Monterey Presidio. It appears that the soldiers paid nothing, and a legend attached to the transfer says a gambler lost a rancho in a card game. On June 7, 1844, the soldiers turned the Rancho over to their superior officer, Colonel José Castro, former Governor Alvarado's brother-in-law.

When Mexico ceded California to the United States following the Mexican–American War, the 1848 Treaty of Guadalupe Hidalgo provided that the land grants would be honored. But the Land Act of 1851 required owners to prove their ownership, and Castro filed a claim for Rancho San Jose y Sur Chiquito with the Public Land Commission in on February 2, 1853. While waiting for his case to be decided, Castro sold his 8,876 acres of land in 1854 to Joseph S. Emery and Abner Bassett for $700, leaving to them the legal fight for ownership. The litigation lasted for 38 years, during which thirty-two others eventually asserted that they owned a portion of the land. Thirty-five years later, in 1886, Castro's successors finally obtained clear title, forcing all other claimants out.

In 1874, a seam of low grade bituminous coal was found in upper Malpaso Canyon. On September 6, 1888, shortly after the patent for Rancho San Jose y Sur Chiquito was approved, almost all of the claimants banded together to form the Carmelo Land and Coal Company. But by 1896, the coal mine was unprofitable.

In 1862, Antonio Victorine, a Portuguese whaler from the Azores, arrived at Point Lobos, following the whale population. Other whaler's from the Azores followed him. Some built cabins on land east of Point Lobos, and old houses on the ranch property still bear Portuguese names, like Victorine and Morales.

Alexander MacMillan Allan, a successful race track architect and real estate developer from Pennsylvania, purchased 640 acres of Point Lobos from the Carmelo Land and Coal Company in 1898. He preserved Point Lobos and established the Point Lobos Dairy at the mouth of San Jose Creek which was operated from 1903 until 1954.

== Acquisition ==
The land was acquired by the Big Sur Land Trust in 1993 for $4.25 million. It held onto the land until 2003, when it sold the land to California State Parks for $3 million in funds from Proposition 117 funds and a $1 million grant from the Coastal Conservancy. Public access is limited.
