= Santa Lucia Preserve =

Unincorporated community in California, United States

The Santa Lucia Preserve
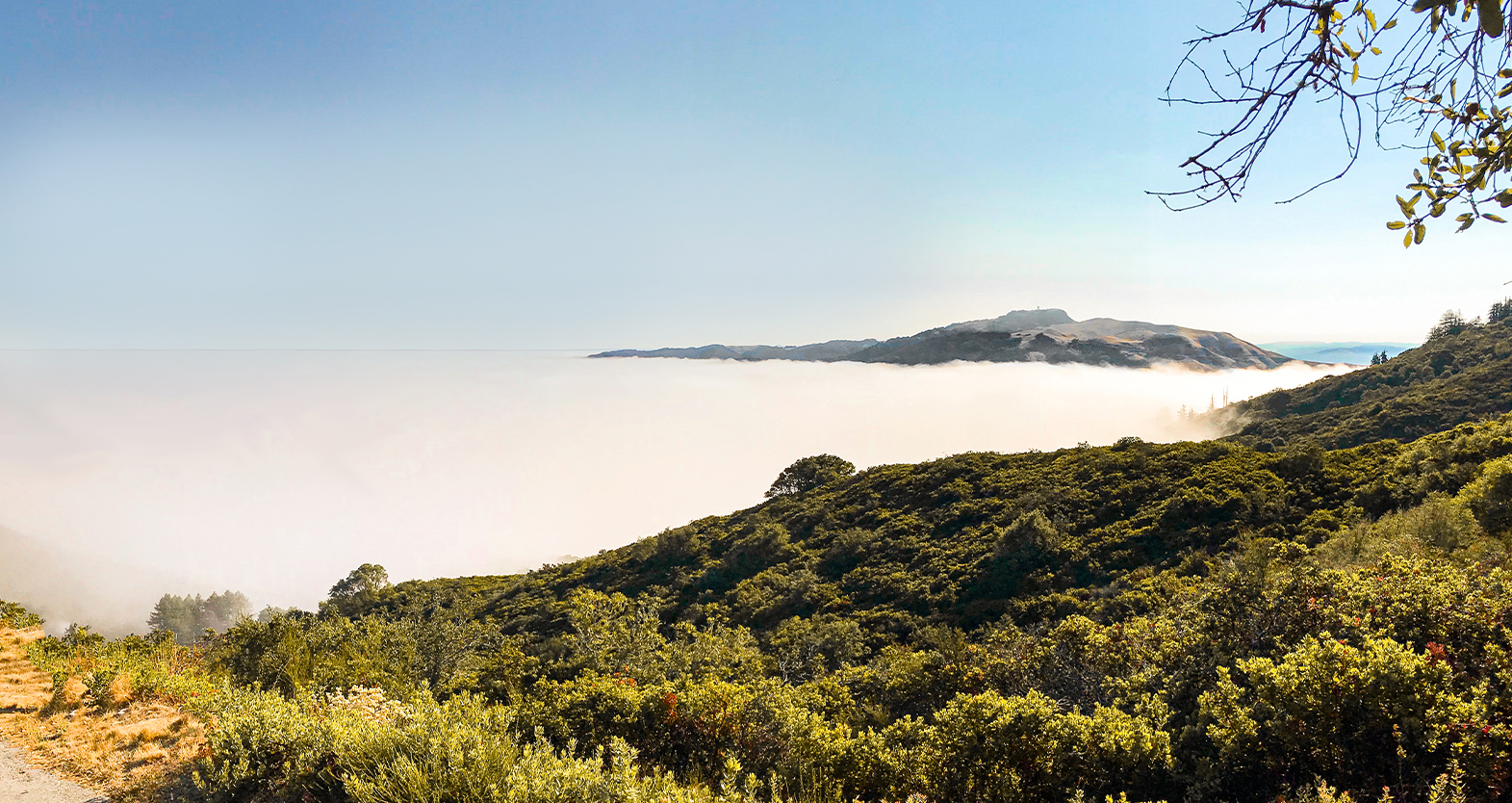
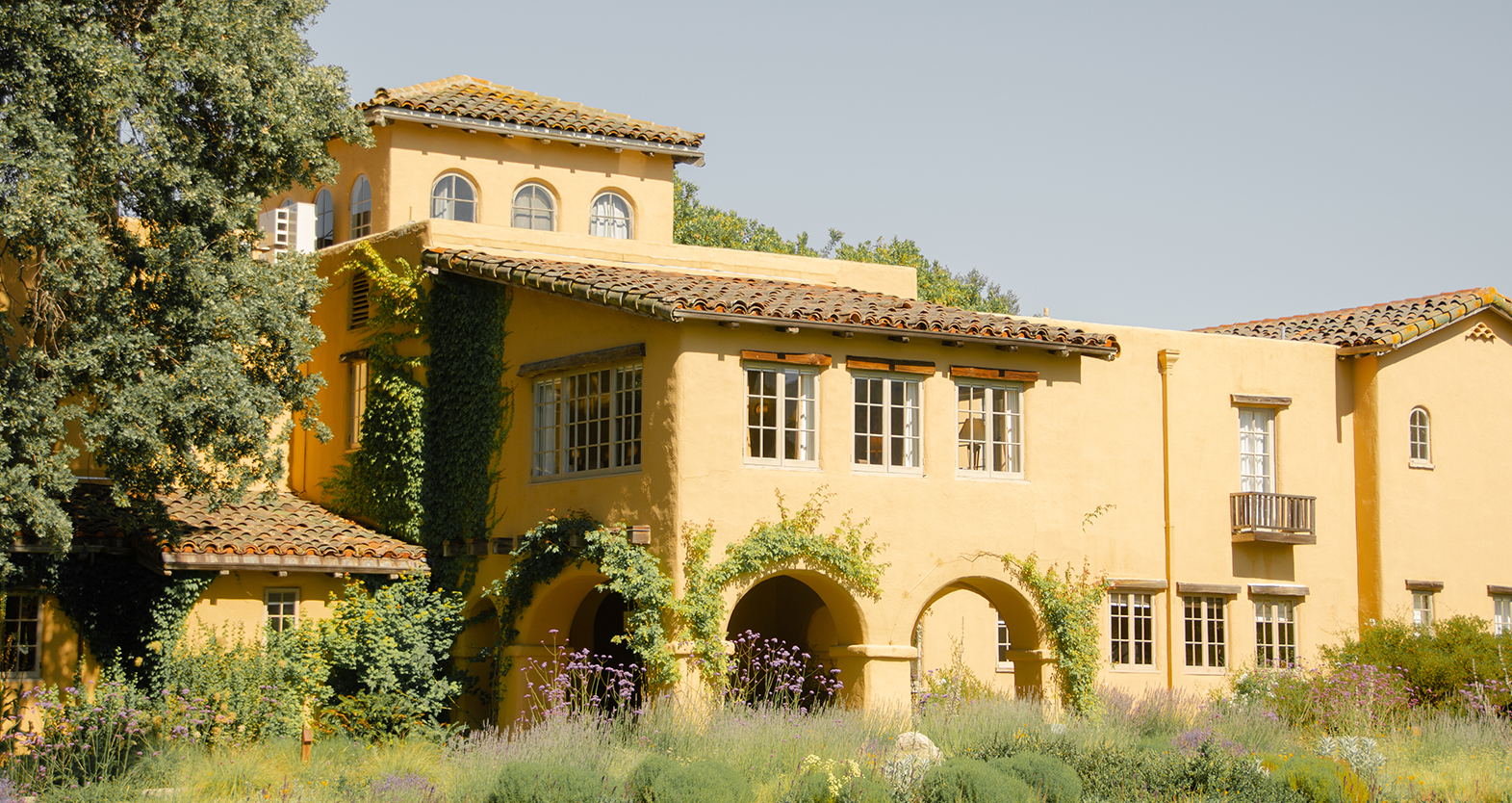
- Top: Peñon Peak is The Preserve's second tallest peak at 2,247 feet (685 m) above sea level. Bottom: The Hacienda is the cultural center of the community.

Project
- Construction started: 1990
- Opening date: 1999; 27 years ago
- Developer: Pacific Union Co.
- Architect: Hart Howerton
- Operator: Santa Lucia Preserve Co. & Santa Lucia Conservancy
- Owner: Santa Lucia Preserve Co. & Santa Lucia Conservancy
- Website: santaluciapreserve.com, slconservancy.com

Physical features
- Major buildings: Hacienda, 1920
- Streets: Robinson Canyon Rd.

Location
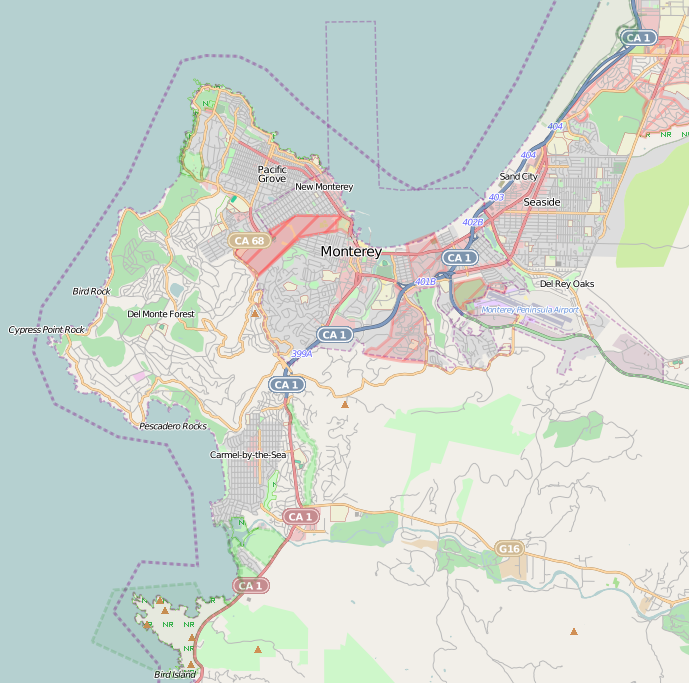
- Location within Monterey Peninsula Location within California
- Coordinates: 36°31′36″N 121°52′05″W
- Location: Carmel, California
- Address: 1 Rancho San Carlos Rd

Area
  - Total: 8,000 ha (20,000 acres)

The Santa Lucia Preserve (/ˈsæn.tə luˈsiːə/) or The Preserve (formerly Rancho San Carlos) is a private, 20,000 acres (8,100 ha) gated development permitting 297 homesites. It is located in the foothills of the Santa Lucia Range between Palo Corona Regional Park and Carmel Valley, California. The Preserve consists of a 12,000 acres (4,900 ha) nature reserve, 8,000 acres (3,200 ha) of open land, and 2,000 acres (810 ha) for development. It contains most of the watershed of Las Garzas Creek, a tributary of the Carmel River.

Developers Peter Stocker and Tom Gray formed the Rancho San Carlos Partnership which purchased the property from Arthur Oppenheimer in 1990 for $70 million. After resolving disputes and lawsuits with environmentalists and activists, The Preserve Company and the Conservancy submitted a modified design that met their approval.

The Partnership established The Preserve as a conservation community, protecting 90% (18,000 acres (7,300 ha)) of the 20,000 acres (8,100 ha) property in perpetuity through the Santa Lucia Conservancy, a conservation land trust.

The remaining 10% (2,000 acres (810 ha)) intended for development is separately owned and operated by The Santa Lucia Preserve Company. The land features 297 homesites, employee housing, an existing Spanish-style hacienda dating to the 1920s, an equestrian center, a small store, a private 365-acre golf course designed by Tom Fazio, and other recreational facilities. Each of the 297 homesites, ranging in size from 10 acres (4.0 ha) to 50 acres (20 ha), were initially projected to sell from around $1 million and up to several million dollars. The partnership's initial investment was around $200 million. The property is now worth an estimated $500 million. A stone gatehouse on Rancho San Carlos Road controls who can access the preserve. Only homeowners, their families and guests, and staff are permitted on the property.

The property has been used as a shooting location for film, television, and commercials. The inactive Sid Ormsbee Fire Lookout, visible throughout Carmel Valley and The Preserve, is located on the property.

== History ==
=== Native American and Pioneer era ===
The land was first settled by the Rumsen Ohlone Native Americans. A Rumsen village known as Echilat was located within the present-day Santa Lucia Preserve. Four prehistoric resource sites were identified within the Preserve, including midden sites containing shell (mussel, chiton and barnacle); lithics (chert, andesite and quartz); fire-altered rock; animal bone; and dark soil. Dark patches in the soil indicate where they cooked acorn patties on hot coals.

The Spanish arrived in the 1770s and established the Presidio of Monterey and the Carmel Mission, creating Alta California. The Rumsen people were devastated by diseases they had no resistance to. The survivors were forcibly incorporated into the colony as neophytes and laborers. When the California Mission System was secularized by the Mexican government in August 1833, the former mission lands in the area of the present-day property were divided into two grants. Rancho Potrero de San Carlos was given to Fructuoso del Real, a Mission Indian. Rancho San Francisquito was granted in 1835 to Dona Catalina Manzanellide Muñras.

The ranchos were each bought and sold over the years. Businessman Bradley Sargent bought the two ranchos in 1876 and renamed them San Francisquito y San Carlos. During Sargent's ownership, author Robert Louis Stevenson fell ill while on a camping trip and was nursed back to health in a cabin on the property, the ruins of which remain today. Sargent's brother managed the land as a cattle ranch.

=== Estate development ===
George Gordon Moore, born in Ontario, Canada in 1875, became a lawyer and later president of the Michigan United Traction Company. He also owned public utilities in Georgia, Nebraska, Canada and Brazil. He built a horsebreeding farm in St. Clair, Michigan and a game preserve in North Carolina.

Moore was a millionaire by the mid-1920s. While visiting Monterey he bought the land and renamed it Rancho San Carlos. Moore spent more than one million dollars to build a 37-bedroom hacienda featuring a 75 feet (23 m) long main room overlooking his custom polo grounds, a guest house, employee quarters, and to excavate an 18 acres (7.3 ha) lake and stock it with fish. He had nine Russian sows and three boars sent from his game preserve in North Carolina for sport hunting which have now spread to all but two of California's 58 counties.

Moore spent lavishly to entertain his guests at extravagant parties attended by Hollywood starlets. He became a socialite and friend of newspaper magnate William Randolph Hearst. He built a secret door to the wine cellar so it could be concealed from authorities during Prohibition. Moore entertained a who's who of Hollywood celebrities and the social elite, including W. Averell Harriman, Lady Alexandra Metcalfe, Tommy Hitchcock Jr., William Tevis, a colorful character who played polo for over sixty years, and Eric Leader Pedley.

Financial losses suffered during the market crash and Great Depression eventually forced Moore into foreclosure in 1939.

Arthur C. Oppenheimer, a businessman from San Francisco who owned the Rosenberg Fruit Company and longed to become a rancher, bought the land. Under the management of his friend, George King, the property was returned once again to a working ranch, and for the next 45 years was well known for raising quality beef. After George King's departure, J.W. (Bill) Luttrell took the reins as manager from 1975 to 1990. When Pacific Union purchased the property, Luttrell retired. Because of Luttrell's vast knowledge of the ranch, Pacific Union kept him on retainer for two years. Although Oppenheimer longed to become a rancher, he and his family did not live there. Instead they used it as a family retreat for half a century.

== Modern development ==
In 1990 the property was purchased by the Rancho San Carlos Partnership (RSCP) from the Oppenheimer family for $70 million. The Partnership's two general partners were A Plus Co., Ltd., a Japanese finance company associated with Sanwa Bank, and Las Garzas Associates Limited Partnership, associated with Pacific Union Co, a San Francisco-based real estate development and management corporation. Co-founder Peter Stocker was killed in a helicopter crash on the property which left completion of the project to his business partner Tom Gray.

=== The Santa Lucia Preserve Company ===
After purchasing the property for $70 million, RSCP engaged in a lengthy process of planning development. Their initial submitted plan set aside 2,000 acres (810 ha) for 300 home sites, 50 employee housing units, a 150-room lodge, a golf course, equestrian center, sports club, tennis courts, and a village center with a general store, gas station, and post office. The RSCP sought and received approval to rezone approximately 1,135 acres (459 ha) of The Preserve for visitor accommodation and commercial development. This compares to an 11,000-unit development that the Oppenheimer family had considered and rejected in 1965.

=== Early criticism ===
When the initial development plan was revealed by RSCP, it encountered considerable suspicion. Some locals protested, petitioned, and sued in an effort to stop the project, with legal support from the Ventana Chapter of Sierra Club. Besides concern that the development was a conservation project in name only—a marketing ploy known as green-washing—some of their specific concerns were that The Preserve would increase local traffic, strain scarce water resources, worsen air quality, and that developers were planning far more development than they were declaring publicly.

The Sierra Club lawsuit (Sierra Club, et al. v. County of Monterey, et al.) successfully placed Measure M on the November 5, 1996 Monterey County ballot. It barred RSCP from building the 150-room lodge and a larger shopping area on the property. Measure M was approved, overturning the County Planning Commission's zoning approval of the 1,135 acres (459 ha) of The Preserve intended for visitor accommodation and commercial use and removing three homesites from the plan.

The Big Sur Land Trust paid for an analysis of the company's plans. Andy Johnson, president of Conservation Advisors, commented that "They’re quite unusual... [Most] developers are out to max out the property. I think they [RSCP] have in their approach the understanding of the importance of maintaining the quality of the environment they’ve acquired. They are really doing more than their share to come up with a unique solution." The developers submitted a modified plan that was eventually supported by conservationists and local officials.

=== Return on investment ===
Thomas Gray, Managing Partner of Las Garzas Association, the development and achievement partner of RSCP and President of Pacific Union Properties, estimated that the final investment would be "on the order of $200 million". RSCP hired a former employee of the Monterey County Planning Department as a consultant to manage their development efforts with the county. They also hired Jeff Froke, a wildland ecologist who was previously associate director of Sanctuaries for the National Audubon Society, as their Natural Resource Manager.Froke was a Partner in the project and eventually President of Santa Lucia Conservancy.

Each of the about 300 homesites, ranging in size from 10 acres (4.0 ha) to 50 acres (20 ha), were projected to sell from around $1 million and up to several million dollars. Sales have confirmed that price range. The acreage provides privacy and insulates neighbors from one another. As of April 2022, an undeveloped 16.57 acres (6.71 ha) lot was listed for $950,000. Buyers must build a home in keeping with strict site-specific guidelines and other restrictions on size, location, and other factors. They may only alter the landscape within an approximately 2.5 acres (1.0 ha) "housing envelope" on their parcel. A completed 6,424 square feet (596.8 m^{2}) five bedroom, six bathroom home on 37 acres (15 ha) was listed at the same time for $6.9 million. HOA fees are more than $1,000 per month. A report in the local Monterey County Weekly estimated that the entire property's value was in excess of $500 million. The main room of the 37-room Spanish Colonial Hacienda built by Moore was converted to a private inn for preserve members, families, and guests. The original polo stable was restored and a modern swimming pool with a two-story slide was built alongside it. The hay barn was converted to a social hall with a dance floor and antique bar.

=== Management ===
After nearly a decade of archeological, hydrological, ecological, and topological research, as well as extensive litigation, the RSCP established two organizations to care for the property: The Santa Lucia Preserve Company to manage real estate, club amenities, and infrastructure (dubbed “Homelands” and “Rancholands”), and the non-profit Santa Lucia Conservancy trust to manage the 18,000 acres (7,300 ha) of wild natural habitat (dubbed “Preserve Lands”). The property has over 100 miles (160 km) of fence and is 1.4 times the size of Manhattan Island's land area (33.58 sq. mi. vs. 22.83 sq. mi.).

The logos and overall brands for both organizations were designed by American graphic designer Michael Patrick Cronan. The strict style guide for homes and the design of a golf clubhouse and numerous recreational facilities were created by architectural firm Hart Howerton. In 2018, an illustrated volume on the history of Rancho San Carlos was published in collaboration with historian Mark Hugh Miller.

=== Santa Lucia Conservancy ===
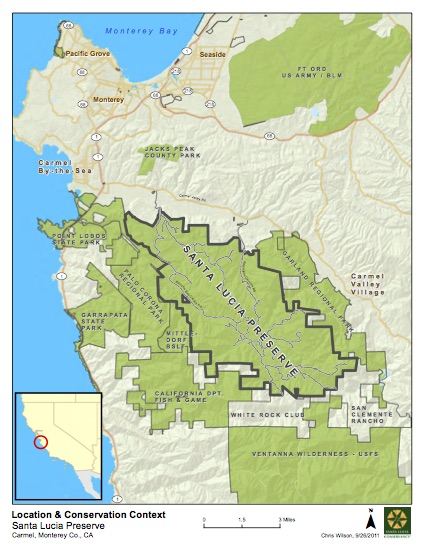
The Santa Lucia Preserve's property boundaries and immediate neighbors. The Monterey Peninsula is visible at top left.

Conservation at The Preserve is managed by the Santa Lucia Conservancy, a 501(c)(3) non-profit land trust, cofounded by Jeff Froke and Tom Gray in 1995 with oversight and legal input from the Trust for Public Land. The Santa Lucia Conservancy has a two-part mission: to protect, enhance, and restore the lands of The Santa Lucia Preserve while promoting ecologically sustainable development. As such, it falls under the IUCN's Category V protected area designation. Conducting adaptive land management across nearly 18,000 acres (7,300 ha) of The Preserve, the Conservancy's programs include conservation grazing, controlled burns and maintenance of firebreaks to build wildfire resilience and adapt to a changing climate, scientific research and monitoring of threatened and endangered species, as well as an environmental education program to both Preserve members and the local community. In partnership with local universities, the Conservancy maintains an ongoing internship program for students looking for field experience in conservation land management and ecology.

In 2018, the Conservancy partnered with the Trust for Public Land and regional conservation organizations to acquire 140 acres (57 ha) of the Carmel River watershed. A large portion of this land was incorporated into Palo Corona Regional Park, while the Conservancy acquired 5 acres (2.0 ha) to use for offices and operations.

=== Environmental impact ===
The Santa Lucia Preserve contributes water to the Carmel Valley Alluvial Aquifer which is the major source of Monterey Peninsula's potable water. Four major streams flow through The Preserve and into the Carmel River: Lower Las Garzas, Portero, San Jose, and San Clemente Creek. All provide habitat for threatened species. Land use and other human influences within The Preserve may affect water quality and quantity in the region. To satisfy monitoring requirements set by the California Environmental Quality Act, the Santa Lucia Conservancy hired The Watershed Institute at California State University Monterey Bay to monitor the river and water quality.

The Conservancy is required to monitor the wildlife found on lands it protects. This included conducting bird and nest counts, locating threatened species such as the California red-legged frog, detecting invasive plants and weeds, and assessing overall grassland health.

To control unwanted species and promote native plant growth, the Conservancy practices conservation grazing. In 2015 the Conservancy hired 1,400 goats that were used to reduce overgrown grasslands that had during prior decades been grazed by native deer and domestic cattle. As a result, the number of threatened California tiger salamander increased.

The Conservancy has sought and received federal funding to pay California State University Monterey Bay graduate students as interns who have conducted research on environmental issues. These projects have focused on surface flow of the Carmel River as well as conservation grazing and avian nest boxes.

=== Fire impact ===
In 2016, the Soberanes Fire burned along The Preserve's southwest border. The property was a critical access point and staging area for firefighters. The fire-fighting efforts were the costliest in US history up to that time.

In 2020, the Conservancy was awarded $2 million in state and federal grants to improve local fire resiliency. In 2021, The Santa Lucia Preserve achieved Firewise Community certification, after extensive efforts between the Santa Lucia Conservancy, Santa Lucia Preserve's Community Services District, and homeowners. Firewise certification (administered by the NFPA, USDA Forest Service, and National Association of State Foresters) recognizes communities that have systematically instituted fuel management plans, use of fire-resistant building materials, strategic placement of structures, and implementation of careful landscaping with ignition-resistant plants.

=== Preserve Golf Club ===
Anyone can purchase memberships in The Preserve Golf Club. A separate recreational "Ranch Club" – providing access to an equestrian center, sports center, and trail system – is available only to Preserve residents and golf club members. The golf club features a private 365 acres (148 ha) Tom Fazio-designed golf course which has been ranked among the top 100 U.S. courses. An annual invitational tournament is held in honor of the late Preserve co-founder, Peter Stocker, who died on the property in the early days of the development.

In 2021, The Preserve Golf Club served as a local qualifying location for the US Open in May, and hosted the California State Amateur Championship in June. In 2022, floating solar and evaporation control panels allowed reduction of the golf course's power load on the local grid by 80%, the first of its kind in Monterey County.

The Preserve Golf Club's Score Card
Tee	Rating/Slope	1	2	3	4	5	6	7	8	9	Out	10	11	12	13	14	15	16	17	18	In	Total
Par		4	3	4	5	4	3	4	5	4	36	4	4	4	5	3	4	3	5	4	36	72
Black	M: 74.4 / 141	442	186	373	562	357	232	360	527	458	3497	377	457	412	571	198	477	141	558	450	3641	7138
Gold	M: 72.3 / 137	412	163	351	528	340	209	331	500	422	3256	335	427	372	535	172	415	131	535	425	3347	6603
Blue	M:70.3/129 W:75.2/133	373	157	341	516	320	177	327	475	381	3067	310	397	348	502	161	374	123	508	384	3107	6174
SI	Men's	3	15	17	1	7	13	11	9	5		12	4	10	8	16	2	18	14	6
White	M:67.8/124 W:72.4/128	354	137	321	472	302	154	306	471	377	2894	281	347	304	371	148	352	112	497	356	2768	5662
Green	W: 79.2/138	288	132	277	468	246	128	300	438	341	2618	277	327	267	365	138	328	102	410	249	2463	5081
SI	Women's	5	17	13	1	3	15	11	9	7		10	4	12	14	16	2	18	8	6

== Sid Ormsbee Lookout ==
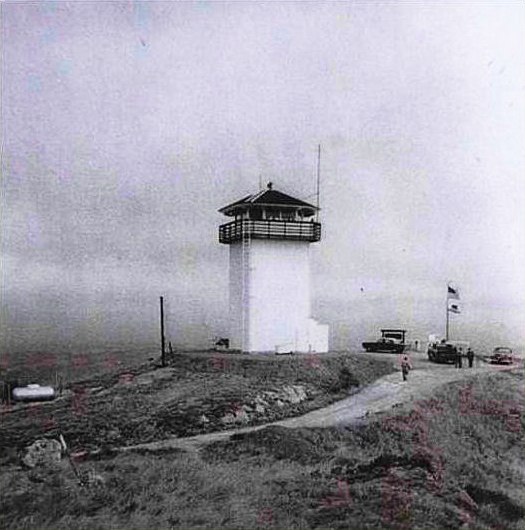
Historic photo of now-decommissioned Sid Ormsbee Lookout

Located within The Santa Lucia Preserve, the Sid Ormsbee Lookout is a 30 feet (9.1 m) tall former fire tower resting atop Peñon Peak (also known as Pinyon, Penyon, and Pinion Peak), constructed in 1948 by the California State Division of Forestry, precursor to today's Cal Fire. The tower is visible throughout The Preserve and Carmel Valley. On a clear day, rangers had views stretching from Blue Rock Ridge in the south, to Mount Toro in the north, and Carmel Hill to the west.

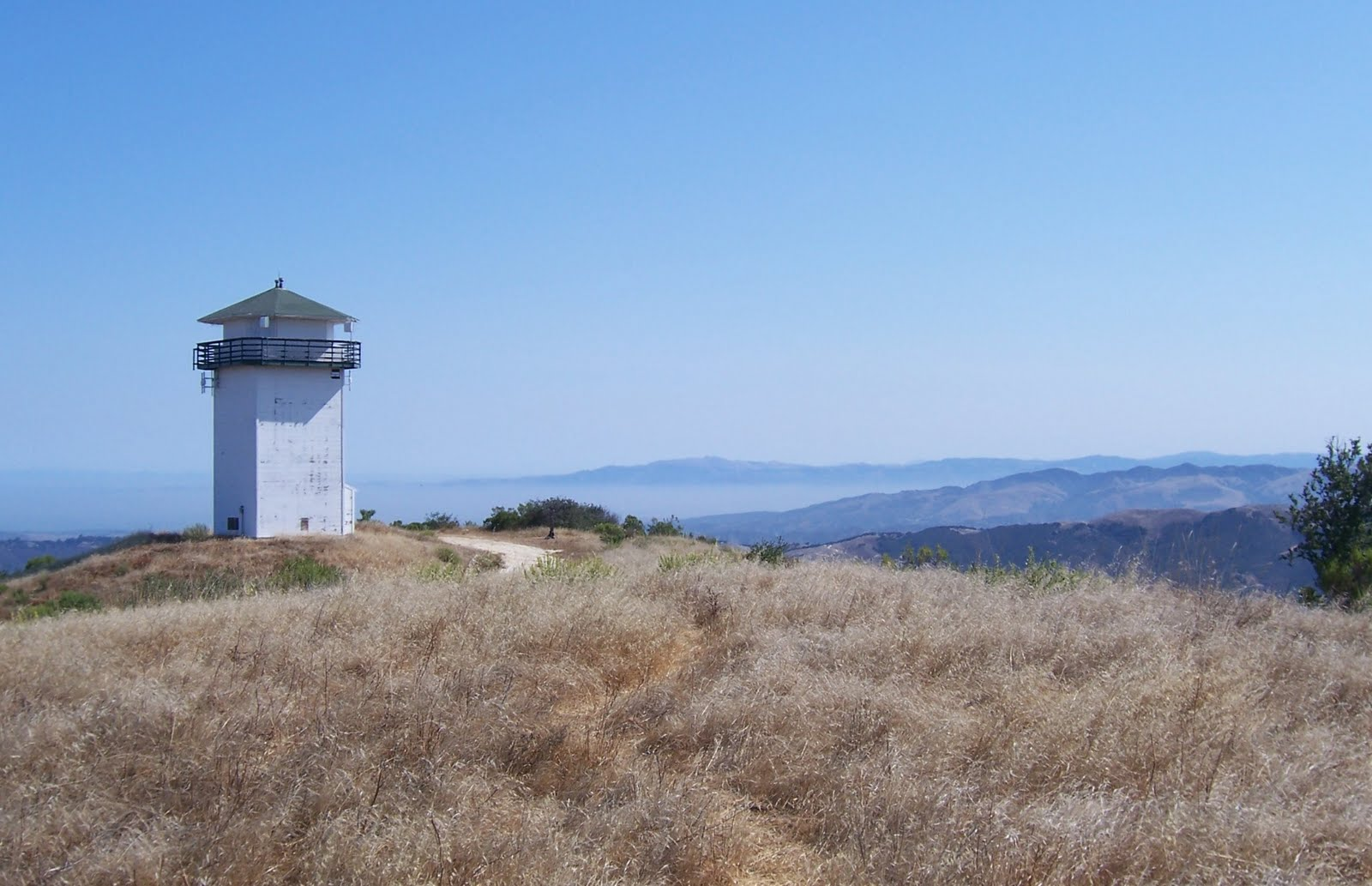
Sid Ormsbee Fire Lookout in 2009

It was named for Sid Ormsbee, a State Forest Ranger who served in World War II and was killed in Italy.

The tower, topped by a 16'x16' octagonal cab, was staffed by alternating seasonal rangers (sometimes with their families) until the 1980s when it was decommissioned. Since 2012 it has served as a radio relay and cell tower for The Preserve, Cal Fire, Monterey County Regional Fire District, and Monterey County Sheriff's Department. It was added to the National Historic Lookout Register in 2010. A plaque commemorating its namesake is positioned at the base. The lookout is not accessible to the public.

== In popular media ==
=== Filming location ===
Since at least the 1960s, the property has served as a shooting location for film, television, and commercials, including a 2020 film shot entirely within a Preserve home, notable for being the first to be written and produced entirely during the COVID-19 pandemic while abiding by local safety guidelines and with approval from the Screen Actors Guild.

Productions Filmed On-site
Film/Television	Release year	Genre
Lancer	1968	Western
Chandler	1971	Crime Noir
Sleeper	1973	Sci-Fi Comedy
The Muppet Movie	1979	Children's Musical
Poco Loco	1994	Romance
Malcolm & Marie	2021	Drama

=== Character inspiration ===
Modern claims that George Gordon Moore inspired the literary character of Jay Gatsby are unproven. Moore assembled a San Carlos Cardinals polo team which featured polo star Tommy Hitchcock Jr., who inspired the character of Tom Buchanan.

== See also ==
- Conservation community
- Land trust
