= Big Sur Land Trust =

Non-profit located in Monterey, California

- Founded: 1978 (48 years ago)
- Headquarters: Monterey, California, United States
- Region served: California Central Coast
- Method: Conservation by Design
- Revenue: US$6.08 million (2015)
- Endowment: US$6.9 million (2015)
- Employees: 16
- Website: bigsurlandtrust.org

The Big Sur Land Trust is a private 501(c)(3) non-profit located in Monterey, California, that has played an instrumental role in preserving land in California's Big Sur and Central Coast regions. The trust was the first to conceive of and use the "conservation buyer" method in 1989 by partnering with government and developers to offer tax benefits as an inducement to sell land at below-market rates. Since 1978, with the support of donors, funders and partners, it has conserved over 40,000 acres (16,187 ha) through conservation easements, acquisition and transfer of land to state, county and city agencies. It has placed conservation easements on 7,000 acres (6,880 ha) and has retained ownership of over 4,000 acres (1,620 ha).

The trust was founded in 1978 by a small group of local Big Sur residents who were members of the Big Sur Citizens' Advisory Committee. Four of the residents visited the San Francisco offices of The Trust for Public Land in 1977 where they learned about land-trust finance and management. They decided to form an organization that could promote environmental protection in keeping with the Coast Master Plan and the California Coastal Act. In February 1978 the community members incorporated The Big Sur Land Trust as a nonprofit California corporation. Their original aim was to protect Big Sur's natural beauty "from over development without recourse to government control while recognizing a property owners' right to sell to whomever they wish". The trust has partnered with many public and private agencies and organizations to protect land.

== History ==
Before Big Sur Land Trust was incorporated, a small group of local Big Sur residents were appointed in 1977 by Monterey County to the Big Sur Citizens' Advisory Committee. They were assisting the county in developing a Coast Master Plan for Big Sur. Retired oil company executive Earl Moser, who helped lead an effort to prevent building a refinery at Moss Landing near Monterey, chaired the effort.

The diverse group shared a common mistrust held by Big Sur residents of added government. They knew local groups were already upset by what they viewed as the California state park's lack of responsiveness to local concerns. The Coast Master Plan and the laws enforced by the California Coastal Commission published new rules for clean air and water, protecting land and sea, endangered species, disposing of hazardous waste and procedures for evaluating new development along the coast with environmental impact reports. A group of Big Sur residents decided to form their own organization that could promote environmental protection reflecting the desires of the people who lived there.

The Big Sur Land Trust is well-regarded and ranked alongside notable trusts like Washington's San Juan Preservation Trust, Wyoming's Jackson Hole Land Trust, New York's Adirondacks Land Trust, and Maine Coast Heritage Trust.

=== Founders ===
In 1978, seven families formed the Big Sur Land Trust. They envisioned preserving the iconic Big Sur landscape for the benefit of future generations. The founding members were Zad Leavy, an experienced attorney and his wife Laela, Sherna and Kipp Stewart, Roger and Beverly Newell, Nancy Hopkins, Lloyd and Pat Addleman, Martin and Suzanne Forster and Peter Harding. Hopkins, daughter-in-law of Hewlett Packard founder David Packard, became the trust's first president. Attorney Zad Leavy became its first executive director and served for 25 years.

=== Board of trustees ===
The Big Sur Land Trust is governed by a board of trustees including 12 trustees and four administrators: board chair, co-chair, treasurer and secretary. Board members represent local and regional community members. The board is supported by a 15-member advisory council and an 11-member science and land management council. Donors include local philanthropists and community members from all backgrounds. The trust is operated by a professional staff and supported by hundreds of members and volunteers. Volunteers play a significant role by contributing their time and talents to stewardship projects, guided hikes, events and many other aspects of Big Sur Land Trust's work.

=== Shifts mission ===
When it was founded in 1978, the trust's mission was to conserve important waters and lands along California's Central Coast and focus on purchasing property for conservation in perpetuity. In 2012, their mission was, "to conserve the significant lands and waters of California's Central Coast for all generations." It emphasized conserving unique landscapes on California's central coast including stream spawning beds for threatened steelhead trout, coastal redwoods, grasslands and oak woodlands. In 2009, it added environmental education and a youth outdoor program.

In 2013, as land values increased and public agency budgets shrank, the trust shifted from purchasing additional land holdings to focus on the well-being of people and land stewardship on the Central Coast. Its mission as of 2023 is "to inspire love of land across generations, conservation of our unique Monterey County landscapes, and access to outdoor experiences for all."

While it formerly stated it was striving to allow more people to gain access to the land it has protected, in 2013 it stated that the land it owned was not open to the public due to limited infrastructure and the need to maintain the quality of the environment. As of 2023, the trust had no plans to add infrastructure, but only "maintain the trail systems, roads, and infrastructure."

The trust manages several properties within Monterey County. The most southern property is the Circle M Ranch near Lucia, California and the most northern properties are the Vierra Ranch and Rancho Colinas in the Gabilan Mountain foothills.

=== First land deal ===
In February 1978, as the trust was being formed, it received an undivided half-interest in 26 acres (11 ha) just north of the Esalen Institute from its co-founder Michael Murphy. The national Trust for Public Land held the half-interest in the Esalen land until the Big Sur trust's federal tax-exempt status was approved by the Internal Revenue Service. Founding member Peter Harding donated the $1,250 filing fee. The mother of one of Murphy's neighbors gave the trust leaders about $2,000 to help start the land fund. As of 2023, the trust owned 5 acres (2.0 ha) at that site.

=== Big Sur Coastal Land Use Plan ===
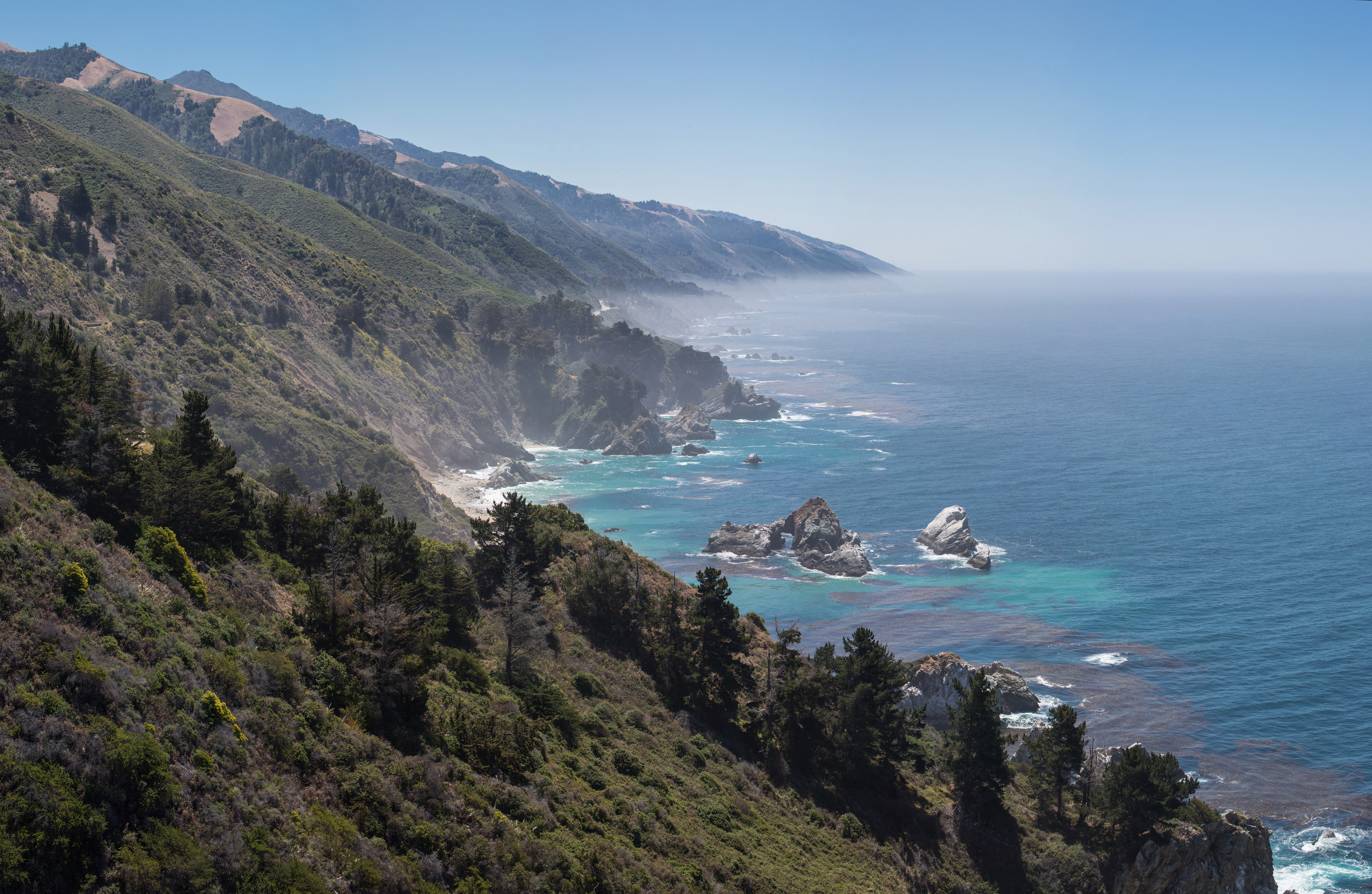
View south towards McWay Cove in Big Sur

The first master plan for the Big Sur coast was written in 1962 by architect and part- time local resident Nathaniel Owings. The members of the Big Sur Citizens' Advisory Committee, who later founded the trust, met with Big Sur residents and county administrators to draft a new land use plan. The new Big Sur Local Coastal Program was approved after four years of work and several months of public hearings and discussion, including input from the residents of Big Sur. It is one of the most restrictive in the state because of efforts to conserve scenic views and the unparalleled beauty of the area. The Coastal Commission approved the plan in April 1986. It remains the primary document used to determine what kind of development is allowed. The plan states: "The overall direction for the future of the Big Sur Coast is based around the theme of preserving the outstanding natural environment.... The County's basic policy is to prohibit all future public or private development visible from Highway 1".

== Financing ==
The trust is supported through memberships fees, private donations, and public conservation funding. Some of its funding comes from California Proposition 70. It generated $776 million in funding for parks, wildlife, and coast conservation. The trust contributed $300,000 to help pass the proposition, one of the largest donations to the effort. Many of the individuals and groups active in the Big Sur land use planning project lent their support to the campaign in support of Proposition 70. County Supervisor Karin Strasser Kauffman, a strong supporter of conservation efforts, supported the effort and the trust. The trust distributed petitions across the state. The initiative passed by a wide margin of 65 percent in June 1988. Proposition 70 funds are distributed to and allocated by county governments.

It also receives specialized grants, including a grant in 2016 for the Carmel River Floodplain Restoration and Environmental Enhancement project and the Carr Lake Project.

As of the reporting period ending in June 2016, the trust had revenue of $6,088,077, income totaling $6,533,045, and assets of $35,452,353. The assets included land worth $19,973,147 and an endowment totaling $6,934,068. It paid its officers a total of $278,759 in compensation and spent $112,000 for lobbying.

=== Partnerships ===
As property values continue to rise in California's Central Coast, the trust has partnered with Monterey Peninsula Regional Park District, The Nature Conservancy, and the California Natural Resources Agency in land acquisition and conservation projects.

=== Pioneer conservation buyer method ===
In 1989, Zad Leavy, a founder of the trust and long-time attorney, conceived of the idea of inducing landowners to sell property through a process later called the "conservation buyer method". It allows a landowner who permanently gives up their developmental rights to the non-profit trust to deduct from their income taxes the difference between the fair market value before the restrictions are in place with the value afterward. The sellers receive a substantial one-time tax reduction, and the new buyers continually benefit permanently from the lowered property taxes.

== Controversial deals ==
Some opponents have criticized the actions of conservation groups like the trust as having "turned the buyout of Big Sur into a business, making millions of dollars buying private land and selling it to government agencies."

=== Gamboa Ranch ===
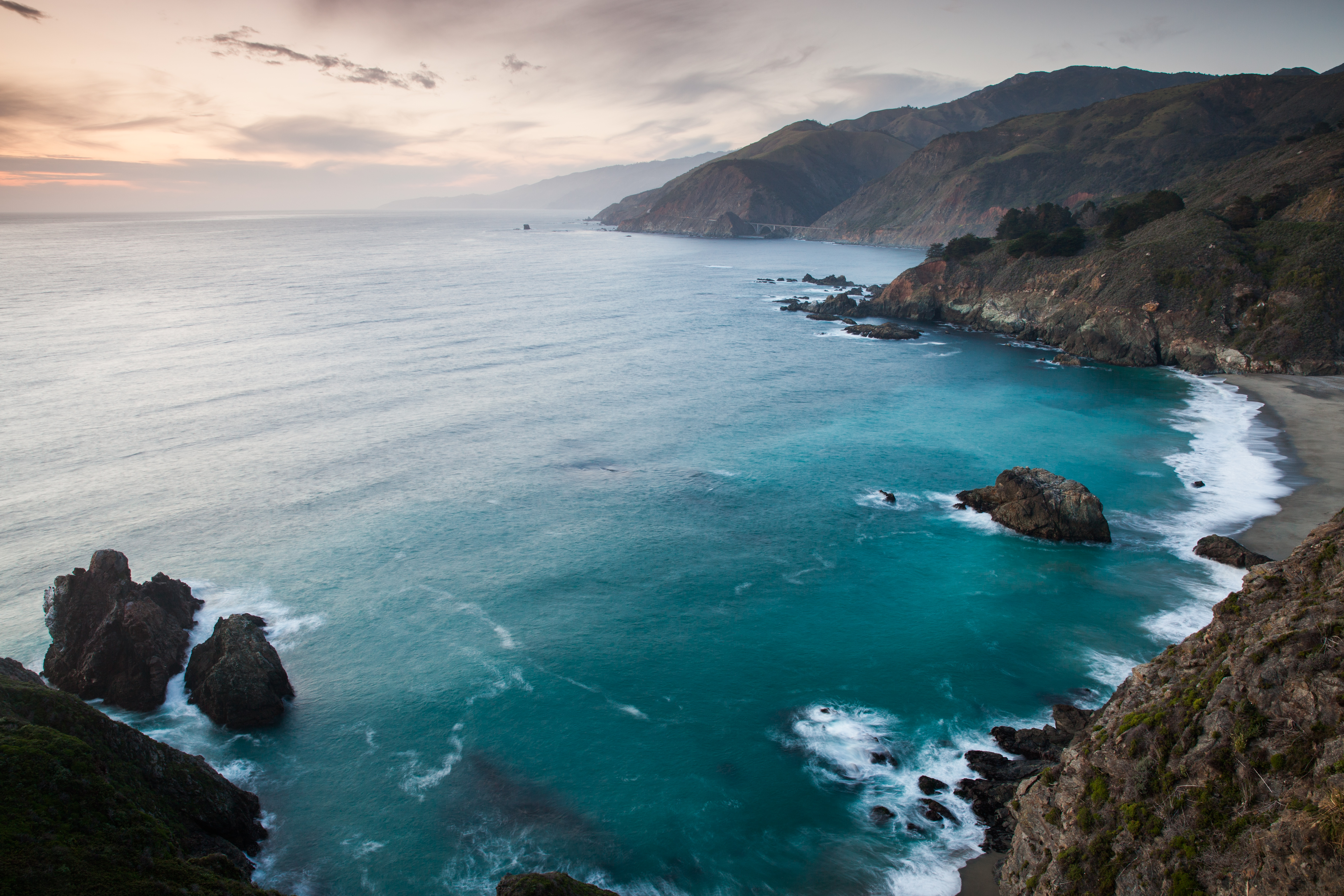
Landels-Hill Big Creek Reserve ocean view

In its second land deal in 1979, the trust edged out buyers from Oklahoma for 3,040 acres (1,230 ha) of land known as the Gamboa Ranch near Lucia, California. The owners of the land, 19 New York lawyers, had foreclosed on the $1 million mortgage in 1971 and in early 1979 were seeking to sell the land. Potential buyers from Oklahoma consulted with California Coastal Commissioner Zad Leavy about allowed usage for the land. After receiving his input, they were confident enough about their plan for a retreat-like development to skip a planned 60-day escrow and made a $1.6 million offer to buy the land from the New York attorneys, which they verbally accepted.

A few days later Commissioner Leavy, without informing the Oklahoma purchasers, switched roles. Acting in his capacity as the attorney for the Big Sur Land Trust, he interrupted the attorneys' meeting during which they were planning to conclude the sale. Leavy offered them $1.2 million in cash and $800,000 in tax credits, the difference between the land's market value and selling price. The tax credit almost completely offset their capital-gains tax payments on the sale.

The six Oklahoma buyers, who had meanwhile flown to California to tour the property for a second time, were "flabbergasted" to learn their agreement had been turned down for a deal that Coastal Commissioner Leavy had arranged acting as attorney for the trust. They were completely unaware that he was acting in any other capacity than as a public official.

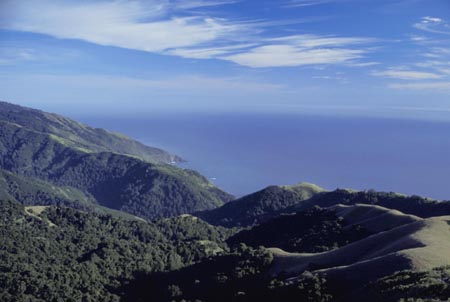
Landels-Hill Big Creek Reserve in Big Sur, California, owned by the University of California

At the same time the trust was negotiating with the attorneys, they also brought in the father-in-law of board member Nancy Hopkins, Hewlett-Packard co-founder David Packard. The entire deal was consummated in less than 48 hours. In a complicated legal strategy known as a double-escrow, the trust bought the land, and during the few minutes they owned the land, they applied a highly restrictive conservation easement on the property. The easement significantly reduced the property's value. Packard wanted a piece of open coastal land and was happy with the covenants and restrictions, but he was initially concerned that the proposed contract was not legal. He asked Executive Director Zad Leavy to confirm that it was permitted by law.

Once Packard was reassured, the trust almost instantly sold him 1,500 acres (607 ha). The trust paid the lawyers $1.125 million, and the lawyers also received a $900,000 charitable donation that offset their capital gains in exchange for the loss they took in selling the land to the trust. Referring to the Oklahoma investors, Leavy commented afterward that "We just barely sneaked under the radar, we just barely beat them".

The trust sold the other half of the land to the University of California who established the Landels-Hill Big Creek Reserve. Due to a revised exclusion to the real estate listing required by the trust, the realtor who had marketed the property and paid over $6,000 for a full-color brochure among other expenses was not reimbursed.

The Big Sur Gazette and the local Coast Property Owners Association charged that Leavy had engaged in a conflict of interest by not revealing both his roles as both a Coastal Commission member and the trust's legal adviser. The property owners threatened to sue, charging that the trust had engaged in deceptive practices. The trust responded that it only works with willing sellers, who choose to place easements on their property which they retained.

=== Clint Eastwood land deals ===
Clint Eastwood bought six parcels totalling 650 acres (263 ha) along Highway 1 near Malpaso Creek, south of the Carmel Highlands, during the 1960s. In 1995, Monterey County bought the land from him for $3.08 million, despite the fact that in July 1994 the county assessor showed the land's assessed value as only $308,682. The county put a permanent conservation easement on the Malpaso property.

Using the proceeds from the sale, Eastwood bought the 134 acres (54 ha) Odello Ranch at the mouth of the Carmel River during the same year. The ranch had been used for several decades as farm land, most recently to produce artichokes. The purchase price included a county-approved tentative subdivision map for 76 lots and the legal right to 196 acre-feet (242,000 m^{3}) of Carmel River water. When he bought the property, Eastwood paid to lower the levees along the southern side of the Carmel River. This helped to protect the Mission Ranch resort he owned, along with the neighboring Mission Fields residential neighborhood on the north side of the river, both of which were flooded in 1994.

In December 1995, Eastwood sought to exercise his right to appropriate the water rights linked to the Odello property from the State Water Resources Control Board. Eastwood and his representatives said during a public hearing on his request that the appropriation was needed to establish the fair market value of the Odello Ranch for tax purposes. He said he might donate the land along with the water rights to the Big Sur Land Trust.

In 1997, Eastwood and his former wife Maggie Johnson (acting as the Eastwood Trust) donated 49 acres (20 ha) of the Odello Ranch property east of Highway 1 to the trust along with the associated water rights. In December 2007, Eastwood announced he intended to transfer ownership of 82 acres (33 ha) and the legal right to 130 acre-feet (160,000 m^{3}) of water to the Big Sur Land Trust.

It took several years to work out the details, however. In the complicated final agreement, the California American Water company received 3 acres (1.2 ha) on which they planned to install wells. On June 28, 2016, Eastwood donated the remaining Odello East land. During the same period, Eastwood purchased 550 acres (223 ha) known as the Cañada Woods development immediately east of the Odello Ranch. As part of the deal, he removed 10 lots previously approved for the Cañada Woods location and nine lots from his Odello property. In exchange, Eastwood transferred the development rights for the 19 units to land adjacent to a 397 acres (161 ha) parcel known as Cañada Woods East that he bought from the trust for $150,000. This parcel had been donated in 1983 by William Cusack to the Big Sur Land Trust and had been set aside as a permanent scenic easement. Eastwood also said he would restore the Rancho Cañada Golf Course to open space.

The exchange drew criticism from some conservationists. The past chairman of the Ventana Chapter of the Sierra Club expressed concern about the deal.

"It's a complex situation, this whole matter of property rights versus community rights," says former Ventana Chapter Sierra Club vice chair Don Gruber, "but the so-called gift package Clint bestowed on the public is questionable at best. A gift is something you give away, but [Eastwood] extracted a lot of value from the property. It's been a chain of dubious events I believe needs to be looked at closely."

Responding to the criticism, BSLT board member Leavy characterized the county's decision to lift that easement as part of the Eastwood purchase as "a political decision". Although the trust owned the land, the county held the conservation easement. Leavy said that preserving the Odello Ranch property had greater priority over the land donated by Cusack. Critics complained about the precedent of selling land without public comment for development purposes that had been set aside as open space.

"We wanted Odello preserved, no question," says Ben Post, chair of the Ventana Chapter of the Sierra Club, "but let's get clear about this, there's a lot of stuff going on here that's not all simply clean and I really challenge the process."

The trust received 49 acres (20 ha) of land, the 67 housing permits associated with the land, and legal right to 28 acre-feet (35,000 m^{3}) of water. The Big Sur trust has previously raised a portion of an estimated $25 million to open a causeway under Highway 1 that will allow more unrestricted flow of the Carmel River into the floodplain west of the highway, reducing the likelihood of flooding.

In the same deal, Eastwood donated 38 acres (15 ha) to Monterey County, which will use some of the land for flood control. The California American Water company received 3 acres (1.2 ha) in the deal that enables them to place two wells that will pump water from the aquifer under Carmel River nearer to the mouth of the Carmel Valley. In an unusual move, the Eastwood Trust agreed to sell 50 acre-feet (62,000 m^{3}) of its 2016 water rights to help offset Cal-Am's existing unlawful diversions from the Carmel River aquifer, and half of that amount in 2017.

Although the State Water Resources Control Board had previously issued a cease and desist order barring Cal-Am from making water available for new connections. it approved the Odello East diversion. The State Water Resources Control Board ruled:

This combination of direct offsets to Cal-Am's unlawful diversions and action to address the long-term negative effects of the unlawful diversions on the environment distinguish this project from the general language regarding applying water to growth on the peninsula, and make approval of the project consistent with the public interest.

As of 2016, the Malpaso property formerly owned by Eastwood and currently owned by the Big Sur trust is off-limits to the public and there are no plans to allow public access. Under the terms of Eastwood's and Johnson's donation of the Odello property to the Big Sur trust, they received a $6 million tax write-off. To manage the sale of the 16 acre-feet (20,000 m^{3}) of water rights he retained, Eastwood formed the Malpaso Water Company, LLC, which was permitted to enter into subscription agreements with new water users. Eastwood's new water company may receive up to $200,000 per acre foot. In 2016, the Malpaso Water Company sold water to help build 120 affordable family housing units developed by TerraCorp on an 8.7 acres (3.5 ha) parcel on Val Verde Drive in Carmel Valley.

== Land ownership ==
As of 2016, the trust had acquired a number of parcels that they continue to own. The table below summarizes major trust acquisitions. The trust obtains the property rights and can choose to retain the land in perpetuity or coordinate with another organization to transfer the parcel into a larger conserved area.

Name	Size	Location	Date acquired	Prior owner	Purchase price	Description & Notes
Carmel River Parkway	3 acres (1 ha)	West of Rancho San Carlos Road in Carmel Valley, California	June 2009	Rancho San Carlos Partnership	$1.13 million	Accessible to the public. Site for future river education center.
Arroyo Seco Ranch	1,712 acres (693 ha)	About 8 miles (13 km) west of Greenfield, California	2007	N/A	$1.30 million (Note: The easement was purchased by the California Wildlife Conservation Fund and is monitored by The Nature Conservancy.)	Access restricted to BSLT members. The land includes about 2 miles (3.2 km) of frontage on the Arroyo Seco River, which flows through the land. sycamore alluvial woodland forest, blue oak, valley oak, coast live oak, providing habitat for California red-legged frog, foothill yellow-legged frog, Pinnacles optioservus riffle beetle, western pond turtle, and steelhead trout.
Glen Deven Ranch	900 acres (364 ha)	Big Sur, California	2001	Seely and Virginia Mudd	Bequest	Access restricted to BSLT members. Above Highway 1 and Palo Colorado Road. Central coast grasslands, woodlands, riparian habitats. The property is used by the trust to host youth summer nature camps for disadvantaged youth, teaching about coastal ecosystems.
Marks Ranch	140.3 acres (57 ha) (Note: Originally included an additional 720.3 acres (291.5 ha) since transferred to Monterey County and incorporated into Toro County Park. See Land Transfers.)	Near Toro County Park, Monterey County, California	2007, 2010	St. John's College, Annapolis, Maryland	$4.75 million	Accessible to the public. Northeast of Toro County Park. Formerly an egg farm and cattle ranch owned by Benjamin and Nisene Marks. The trust sold 624 acres (253 ha) for $2.2 million in 2010 and another 113 acres (46 ha) in 2012 for $2.7 million to Monterey County for inclusion in Toro Park. The remaining 79 acres (32 ha) held by the trust includes the Marks family hacienda and adjacent lands. The Violini family is maintaining the ranching operation. The trust is converting the buildings to a gathering location for Salinas and Monterey Peninsula families.
Mitteldorf Preserve	1,043 acres (422 ha)	Santa Lucia Foothills, Monterey County, California	February 1990	Westbrook Land and Timber Company	$1.35 million	Access restricted to BSLT members. The land is accessible through the Santa Lucia Preserve and is only open to members of the Big Sur Land Trust. Located between Joshua Creek Canyon Ecological Reserve the south, Palo Corona Regional Park on the north, and Santa Lucia Preserve to the east. Mitteldorf conserves the largest redwood trees in Monterey County. It also protects madrone, oak woodland, coastal chaparral, and grassland habitats. The trust is developing infrastructure for a nature camp and research program.
Carmel River Songbird Preserve and Carmel River Parkway	11.4 acres (5 ha)	Carmel Valley, Monterey County, California	2008	McWhorter family	$1 million	Accessible to the public. Located near Schulte Road 6 miles (9.7 km) east of Highway 1; riparian, fish and floodplain habitat for 43 types of birds, California redlegged frog, Western pond turtle, and steelhead trout. Connecting to the 1.5 miles (2.4 km) South Bank Trail from Quail Lodge to Palo Corona Regional Park. A special one-day permit is required to enter Palo Corona Regional Park.
Notley's Landing	8 acres (3 ha)	About 11 miles (18 km) south of Carmel, Monterey County, California	2001	Rose Ulman	$400,000 (Note: Purchased with help from the state Coastal Conservancy, Catherine L. and Robert O. McMahan Foundation, the Barnet J. Segal Charitable Trust, and the Robert V. Brown and Patricia M. Brown Monterey Fund.)	Access restricted to BSLT members. The Big Sur trust planned to open it to the public with hiking trails.
Odello East	51 acres (21 ha)	East of Highway 1, south of the Carmel River, Monterey County, California	1998, 2016	Clint Eastwood	Land exchange	Accessible to the public. Eastwood purchased the land and donated it to the trust. In exchange, conservation easements were removed from other land he owned further east.
Kopp	5 acres (2 ha)	South of Gorda				Access restricted to BSLT members.
Canavarro	27.8 acres (11 ha)	East of Point Lobos				Access restricted to BSLT members.
Carmel Point	.5 acres (0 ha)	On Carmel Point between Carmel Beach City Park and Carmel River State Beach				Access restricted to BSLT members.
Mission Trails/Probasco	.3 acres (0 ha)	West of Mission Trail Nature Preserve				Access restricted to BSLT members.
Curtis	20 acres (8 ha)	East of Point Lobos				Access restricted to BSLT members.
Carr Lake	73 acres (30 ha)	Central Salinas, California	2017	Ikeda Farms Partnership	$3.95 million	Continued use for agricultural purposes.
Carmel Highlands Vista Point	.37 acres (0.15 ha)	Adjacent to Caltrans turnout near Hyatt Carmel Highlands	1986		Donated	Preserve Monterey cypress and scenic views
Patriarch Ridge	83.5 acres (34 ha)	Santa Lucia Mountains, between the Carmel River and the San Jose Creek watersheds	2020	Al and Anne Washburn	$210,000	Access restricted to BSLT members. Old growth mixed evergreen woodland, including madrone, live oak, chaparral, and grassland habitat. Connects the Mitteldorf Preserve and the Joshua Creek Canyon Ecological Reserve.

== Conservation easements ==
The trust has negotiated a number of agreements covering about 17,000 acres (6,880 ha) with private property owners to preserve the land without transferring ownership. In these instances, the property owners agree to give up the right to develop the land and to conserve resources in perpetuity.

The landowner receives a one-time tax break, the difference between the prior market value and the value after the ability to develop the land is removed. They also receive the benefit of an ongoing reduction in property taxes. The conservation agreement stipulates that the conserved lands are managed based on values and intentions stipulated to by both parties.

Name	Beneficiaries	Acreage	Year	Easement value	Location and habitat
Addleman	Pat and Lloyd Addleman	318.5 acres (129 ha)	1984	N/A	Along Burns Creek; Redwood forest, coastal sage scrub.
El Sur Ranch	Jim Hill	3,550 acres (1,437 ha)	1997	$11.5 million	From the Point Sur Naval Facility to the mouth of the Little Sur River at Hurricane Point; coastal plains.
Dorrance Ranch	Dorrance family	4,259 acres (1,724 ha)	March 2008	$6 million, gift (Note: The Dorrance family gave the $940,000 difference between the appraised value and the purchase price as a charitable gift. The Big Sur Land Trust was one of several groups that provided funds.)	About 10 miles (16 km) south of Salinas and 15 miles (24 km) east/southeast of Monterey in the Sierra de Salinas Mountain Range of Monterey County on Mount Toro; oak savannas, ponds, wetlands, and grasslands, habitat for golden eagle, California red-legged frog, California tiger salamander, burrowing owl, California condor, and others.
Carmel River Parkway	Quail Lodge, Inc.	10 acres (4 ha)	June 2009	Gift	West of Rancho San Carlos Road in Carmel Valley, California.
Rancho Colinas	Ron and Linda Stoney	1,107 acres (448 ha)	2009	N/A	Gabilan Mountain foothills, south of San Juan Bautista; oak woodlands, grasslands and wildlife corridors.
Vierra Ranch	Ron and Linda Stoney	965 acres (391 ha)	2014	$1 million	Gabilan Mountain foothills, 6 miles (9.7 km) north of Salinas; oak woodlands, grasslands and wildlife corridors.
Violini Ranch	Johnny and Henry Violini	3,200 acres (1,295 ha)	December 2007	$1 million	Southwest of Salinas, on the Sierra de Salinas ridge between Salinas and Carmel valleys; blue and valley oak woodlands, native grasslands, savannas and wetlands.
Harkins		240 acres (97 ha)			Upper Carmel Valley.
Mule Creek Canyon		173.6 acres (70 ha)			South of Pfeiffer Big Sur State Park.
Patterson Mayer		104.2 acres (42 ha)			East of Esalen Hot Springs.
Patterson Lime Creek		534.9 acres (216 ha)			South of Esalen Hot Springs, east of Highway 1.
Patterson Saint Lucia		58.4 acres (24 ha)			South of Esalen Hot Springs, west of Highway 1.
Owings		35.4 acres (14 ha)			South of Pfeiffer Big Sur State Park, west of Highway 1.
Gelbart		8.7 acres (4 ha)			South of Pfeiffer Big Sur State Park.
South Overstrom	Chris Prentiss	488.8 acres (198 ha)	1997		Big Creek watershed, south coast of Big Sur, east of Highway 1.

== Land transfers ==
Land transfers are instances where the trust purchases property and then sells or donates the land to a third party. When the property is transferred a conservation easement is added to the title requiring the buyer to maintain the land in its undeveloped state. These kinds of transfers usually incorporate the property into a larger park. The third parties have included private individuals, the Monterey Peninsula Regional Park District, the United States Forest Service, and California State Parks and Recreation.

The trust collaborates with state and regional agencies and other conservation partners to preserve larger purchases. The easements help expand wildlife habitat and native plant populations within watersheds.

Transfer name	Former name	Value / purchase price	Acreage	Former owner	Year transferred	New owner	Location and notes	Key habitat and resources
de Dampierre River Trails Park	Moo Land	$1.925 million	32 acres (13 ha)	Genevieve de Dampierre	2006, 2012	Monterey Peninsula Regional Park District	Southwest of Carmel Valley Village and adjacent to Garland Regional Park	Woodlands, grasslands and dense riparian vegetation. The trust restored a trail on the park in 2011.
Landels-Hill Big Creek Reserve; Circle M Ranch	Gamboa Ranch	$1.125 million plus $900,000 in tax benefits	2,476 acres (1,002 ha)	Consortium of New York attorneys	1978	David Packard and University of California	On Highway 1 south of Big Creek in southern Big Sur.	Available for research or educational purposes by reservation.
Martin Dunes	Granite Rock quarry	$3.5 million	125 acres (51 ha)	Graniterock Company	1998	Privately owned by numerous private landowners in partnership with the Big Sur Land Trust.	Marina, California	Near the mouth of the Salinas River. Coastal dunes habitat for five threatened species.
Marina Dunes Preserve	Granite Rock quarry	$3.5 million	47.1 acres (19 ha)	Graniterock	1998; 2000	Monterey Peninsula Regional Park District	Marina, California	Coastal dunes habitat for endangered Smith's blue butterfly, threatened western snowy plover, California legless lizard, Monterey spineflower, Monterey gilia, Menzies' wallflower, and western snowy plover.
Henry Miller Memorial Library	Henry Miller Memorial Library	Bequest	30.69 acres (12 ha) in two parcels	Emil White	1989, 1997	Miller Memorial Library	48603 Highway 1, Big Sur, CA	Cultural site
Long Valley	Long Valley Ranch	$2.4 million (Note: In partnership with the Elkhorn Slough Foundation and David and Lucile Packard Foundation.)	425 acres (172 ha)		1998	Elkhorn Slough Foundation	Midway between Prunedale and Las Lomas off San Miguel Canyon Road at Elkhorn Slough, Moss Landing, California	Live oak woodland and maritime chaparral.
Mill Creek Redwood Preserve		$2 million	1,386 acres (561 ha)	Philo Lumber Company; Barnet Segal Trust 125 acres (51 ha)	1988, 2000	Monterey Peninsula Regional Park District	Palo Colorado Canyon,	Coastal redwoods
Palo Corona Ranch	Fish Ranch	$32 million	9,898 acres (4,006 ha) initially; reduced with land given to the Joshua Creek Canyon Ecological Reserve to 4,300 acres (1,740 ha)	Craig McCaw	2002, 2004	Monterey Peninsula Regional Park District	Restricted Access. East of Point Lobos.	Coastal grasslands and woodland, ponds, and perennial creeks.
Joshua Creek Canyon Ecological Reserve		$940,000 initially; $5 million for additional land purchase	680 acres (275 ha) in two parcels initially; increased to 5,750 acres (2,327 ha) in 2004		1992; 2004	California Department of Fish and Game	Restricted public access. 12 miles (19 km) south of Carmel, California and inland from Highway 1.	Old-growth coastal redwoods, coastal scrub, and broad-leafed riparian; habitat for Smith's blue butterfly.
Palo Corona Regional Park	Whisler-Wilson Ranch; formerly A.M. Allen Ranch (317 acres (128 ha))	$4.25 million (Note: Funds were contributed by the Catherine L. and Robert O. McMahan Foundation, and The Nature Conservancy, which contributed $166,050 for preservation of redwoods and stream habitat.)	4,300 acres (1,740 ha)	Whisler and Wilson Family Trusts	2010, 2012	Monterey Peninsula Regional Park District	Restricted Access to the northern 600 acres (240 ha). No access to the remainder. East of Point Lobos.	First redwood forest south of Carmel; steelhead stream habitat.
Point Lobos Ranch	A.M. Allen Ranch	$11.1 million	1,315 acres (532 ha)		Acquired in 1993; transferred in 2003.	California Department of Parks and Recreation	No public access. Northeast of Point Lobos.	Contains one of the world's largest native Monterey pine forests, endangered Gowen cypress, and rare maritime chaparral plant community.
The Horse Pasture	The Horse Pasture	$1.1 million	153 acres (62 ha)	Robert, Adam, and Anna Beck	March 2007	The Wilderness Trust	Partnership with Wilderness Land Trust. Located in the northern Las Padres National Forest adjacent to Tassajara Hot Springs. Added to the adjacent Ventana Wilderness.	A mixture of chemise-dominated chaparral, mixed oak, Coulter Pine forest, and meadow.
Kent			56.9 acres (23 ha)				Southeast of Andrew Molera State Park, west of Highway 1.	
Ewoldson			31.3 acres (13 ha)				Restricted public access. Southeast of Andrew Molera State Park, east of Highway 1.	
San Carlos Beach Park	San Carlos Beach Park		1.9 acres (1 ha)			Monterey Peninsula Regional Park District	Accessible to the public. West of Coast Guard Pier, Monterey, California.	
Monterey State Beach	Monterey State Beach		1.3 acres (1 ha)			California Department of Parks and Recreation	Restricted public access. North of Monterey Municipal Pier.	

== Other projects ==
The trust works on a number of projects in the Monterey County region. Projects focus on the expansion of preserved natural habitat for unique central coast species, and increasing the opportunities available for community members to connect with the environment.

=== Carmel River Parkway ===
Starting in 2004, the Big Sur Land Trust began efforts to collaborate with other agencies and the local community to protect and restore the Carmel River. They developed a conservation plan to restore and enhance the Carmel River ecosystem. One of the major components is a recreational trail that will connect the lower Carmel Valley to upper reaches of the watershed. About 20 agencies and organizations and more than 200 residents contributed to the planning. Known as the Carmel River Parkway Vision Plan, it includes integrated plans for trails, park lands, restored natural areas, and public informational sites in the Carmel River watershed.

The South Bank Trail

The trust received a $1.2 million grant from the California Resources Agency River Parkways Program to build a 1.5 miles (2.4 km) long handicapped accessible pedestrian and bicycle path that connected the Quail Lodge resort in Carmel Valley to Palo Corona Regional Park. Monterey County secured a grant to design the trail, and the trust received private donations to acquire an easement from private landowners to build the trail. It was completed in October 2011.

Carmel River floodplain restoration

The Carmel River Floodplain Restoration and Environmental Enhancement Project is a plan to restore the natural hydrology of the Carmel River near the Carmel Lagoon and minimize flood risk. When the project is completed, it is expected to:

- Improve habitat for steelhead.
- Increase connectivity between the river channel, floodplain, and lagoon.
- Restore native riparian and grassland habitat.
- Reduce flood risk for businesses and residences in Lower Carmel Valley.

=== Lobos-Corona Parklands Project ===
In 2017, the trust signed a memorandum of understanding with California State Parks, Monterey Peninsula Regional Park District, and the Point Lobos Foundation committing to work together to open up the connected properties to the public. The Allen Ranch at the center of the properties is key to the plan, as it makes it possible to add parking that has otherwise been impossible to build due to right-of-way issues.As of 2018, Point Lobos has only 150 on-site parking spaces. Visitors must park on the shoulder of Highway 1 and often cross it to enter Point Lobos.

The Lobos-Corona Parklands Project is a collaboration between the Monterey Peninsula Regional Park District, the Big Sur Land Trust, California State Parks, and the Point Lobos Foundation. The trust was a leader in a number of components of the Lobos-Corona project including developing the Carmel River Parkway Project and the South Bank Trail. The organization has also contributed to land acquisition and development at Palo Corona Regional Park.

The Big Sur Land Trust purchased the former A.M. Allen Ranch from the Whisler and Wilson Family Trusts in 2003 for $4.25 million and sold the property to the Monterey Peninsula Regional Park District in 2013 for $4 million. The property spans the east side of Highway 1 from Carmel to Pt. Lobos and connects Palo Corona Regional Park to Point Lobos Ranch. In collaboration with the Monterey Regional Park District, the trust developed the 4.5 miles (7.2 km) Hatton Canyon recreational trail that connects the top of Carmel Hill to the lower Camel River Trail System at Carmel Valley Road. The trust also helped establish a visitor access and land management plan to address land management issues, including:

- Habitat monitoring for special status animals on the Central Coast including the California red-legged frog and California tiger salamander.
- Maintenance of healthy grasslands and control of invasive plant species.
- Protection of biologically diverse habitats.

=== Carr Lake Multi-Use Park ===
In 2016, the trust received a grant from the California Coastal Conservancy to acquire Carr Lake, a 500 acres (202 ha) undeveloped space in the center of Salinas, California. The low-lying land has been largely used as farmland. Runoff from the farming operations flows northeast through a reclamation ditch toward Tembladero Slough and into the old Salinas River, and eventually into the Monterey Bay National Marine Sanctuary. Sediments that have accumulated in the ditch increase flood risk to nearby homes. The trust is working with city of Salinas to re-purpose the land and create a multi-use community park. The trust acquired 73 acres (30 ha) on January 25, 2017, from Ikeda Farms Partnership for $3.95 million. The land is to remain in use for agriculture purposes for several years while the trust works with community organizations and develops a plan for the land. The purchase was funded by California State Coastal Conservancy, the California Natural Resources Agency River Parkways Program, David and Lucile Packard Foundation, Monterey Peninsula Foundation and the Barnet Segal Charitable Trust.
