= Rancho Potrero de San Carlos =

Mexican land grant in California

Coordinates: 36.520°N 121.880°W

Rancho Potrero de San Carlos was a one square league (4,307-acre (17.43 km^{2})) Mexican land grant in present-day Monterey County, California. It was given in 1837 by Governor Juan B. Alvarado to Fructuoso del Real, a Native American from the Mission San Carlos. The land had been part of the pasture of the Mission San Carlos. The grant was located on the south bank of the Carmel River. As of current day, it is part of The Santa Lucia Preserve, a gated community and nature preserve.

== History ==
When Fructuoso del Real died in 1845, he passed the land to his daughter, Maria Estefana del Real, who married Joaquín Gutierrez, a soldier.

When Mexico ceded California to the United States after the Mexican-American War, the 1848 Treaty of Guadalupe Hidalgo stipulated that the land grants would be honored. However, owners were required to provide proof of their title. As required by the Land Act of 1851, Gutierrez and Real filed a claim for Rancho Potrero de San Carlos with the Public Land Commission in 1852. The court approved their Land patent in 1862.

In 1857 Bradley Varnum Sargent bought Rancho Potrero de San Carlos. Sargent (1828–1893), born in New Hampshire, came to California with his three brothers, Jacob L. (1818–1890), Roswell C. (1821–1903), and James P. (1823-1890) in 1849. In 1856 the Sargent brothers bought Rancho Juristac south of present-day Gilroy. Sargent moved to Monterey in 1858. Sargent also purchased Rancho San Francisquito southeast of Rancho Potrero de San Carlos and combined the two into a single large ranch. He eventually owned thousands of head of cattle and hundreds of horses. He became a prominent attorney until his death in 1893.
