= Bixby Creek =

Bixby Creek may refer to:

- Bixby Creek (California)
- Bixby Creek (Michigan)
- Bixby Creek Bridge, bridge in California

== See also ==
- Bixby (disambiguation)
