= Malpaso Creek =

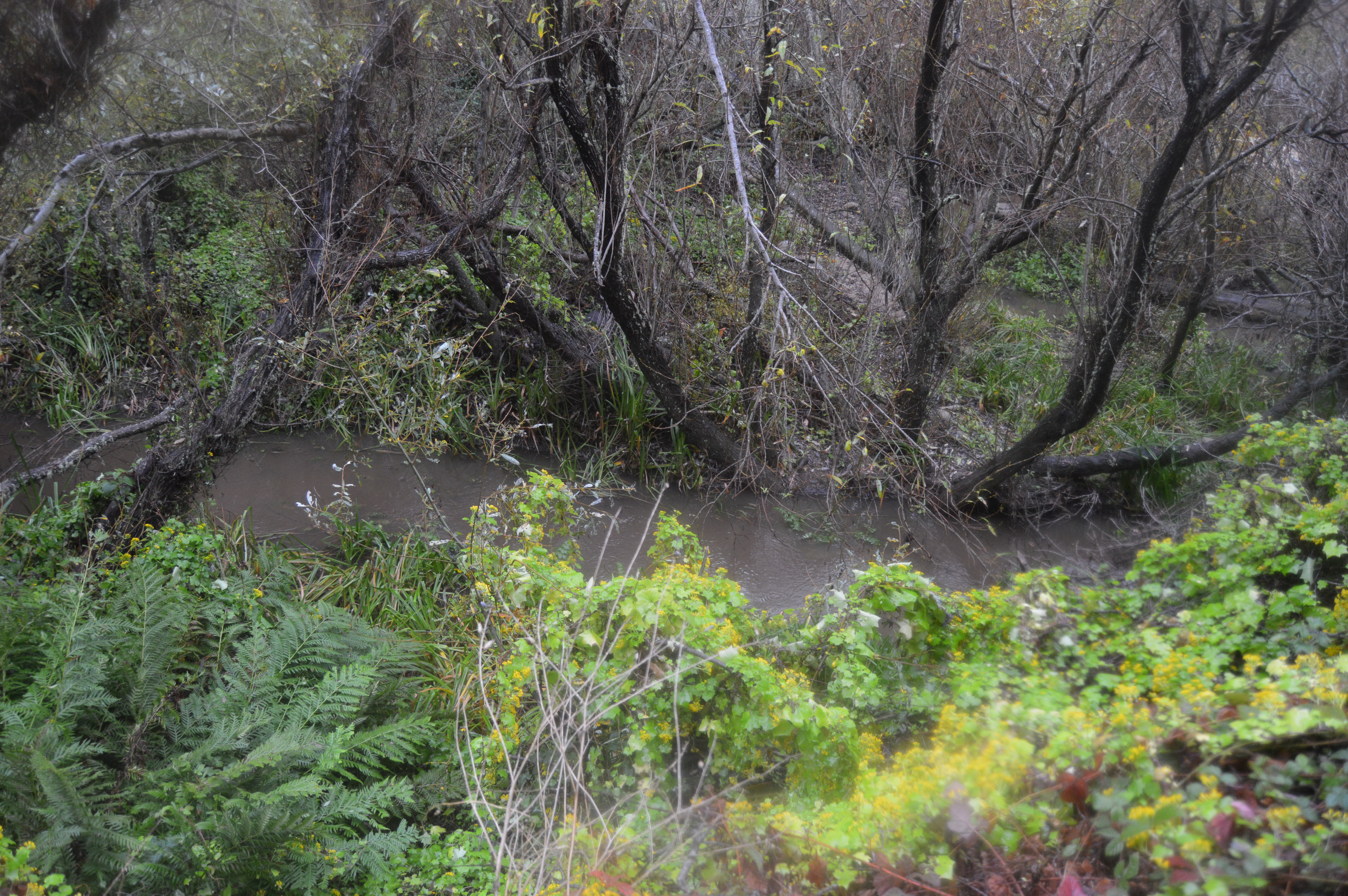
- Malpaso Creek after rain

- Location of the mouth of Malpaso Creek in California
- Etymology: Spanish: mal (bad) + paso (pass or step)

Physical characteristics
- Mouth
  - location: Little Malpaso Beach
  - coordinates: 36°28′53″N 121°56′17″W
- Length: 4.25 mi (6.84 km)

Basin features
- Progression: Malpaso Creek → Pacific Ocean

Malpaso Creek is a small, coastal stream 5 miles (8.0 km) south of Carmel in Monterey County, California, United States. It is generally regarded as the northern border of Big Sur in central coastal California. A low grade bituminous coal deposit was found in upper Malpaso Canyon in 1874. Actor and director Clint Eastwood bought 650 acres (260 ha) of land in the vicinity of the creek and named his production company Malpaso Productions after the creek.

== Location ==
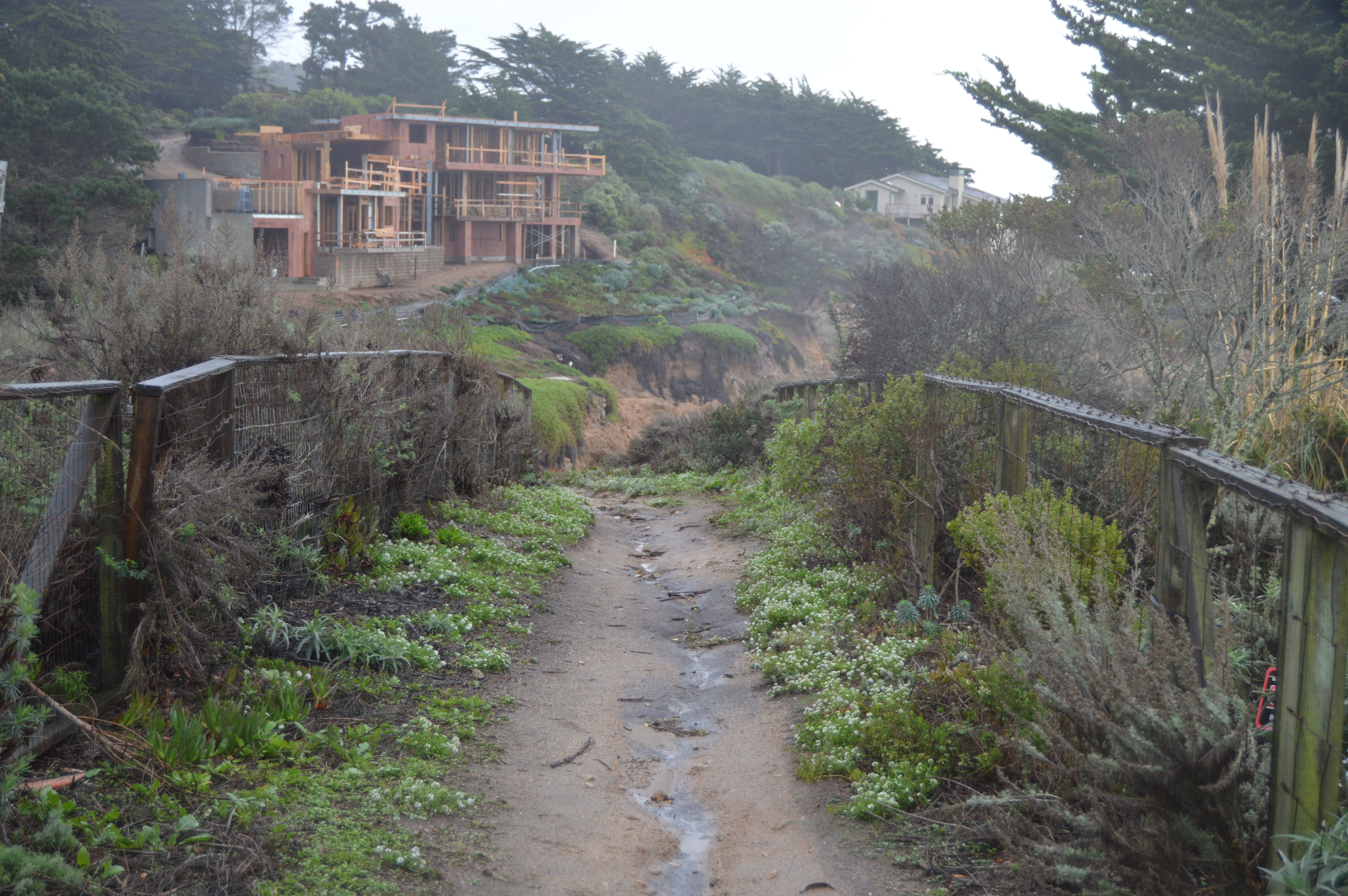
Public beach access trail

The creek and its canyon also defines the northern border of Garrapata State Park. The mouth of the creek is located at Little Malpaso Beach where there is a small white sandy beach, tide pools, and a narrow cave.

== Etymology ==
The creek was named by the United States Coast Survey from the hand-drawn diseño of Rancho San Jose y Sur Chiquito. The translation of the creek's name, "bad step", or "bad crossing", was based on how difficult it was to cross the abrupt canyon before a bridge was built across it in 1935.

== Geography and minerals ==
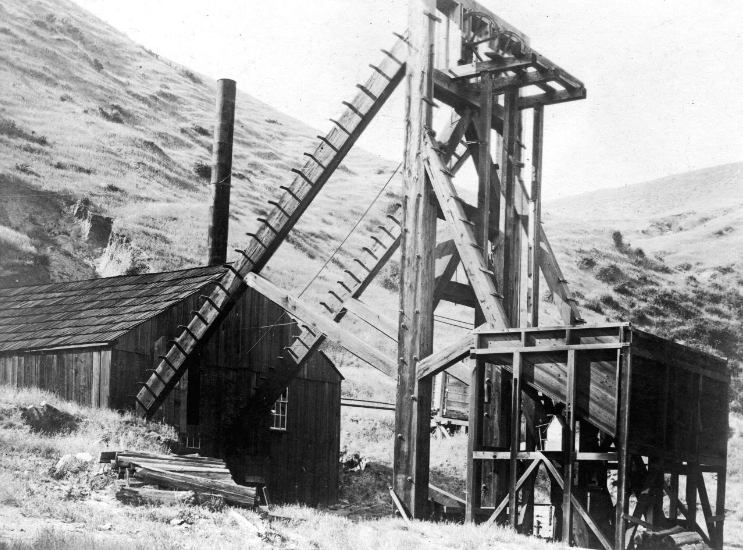
Headstock of the Carmelo Land and Coal Company mine in upper Malpaso Canyon, south of Carmel, California, in 1895.

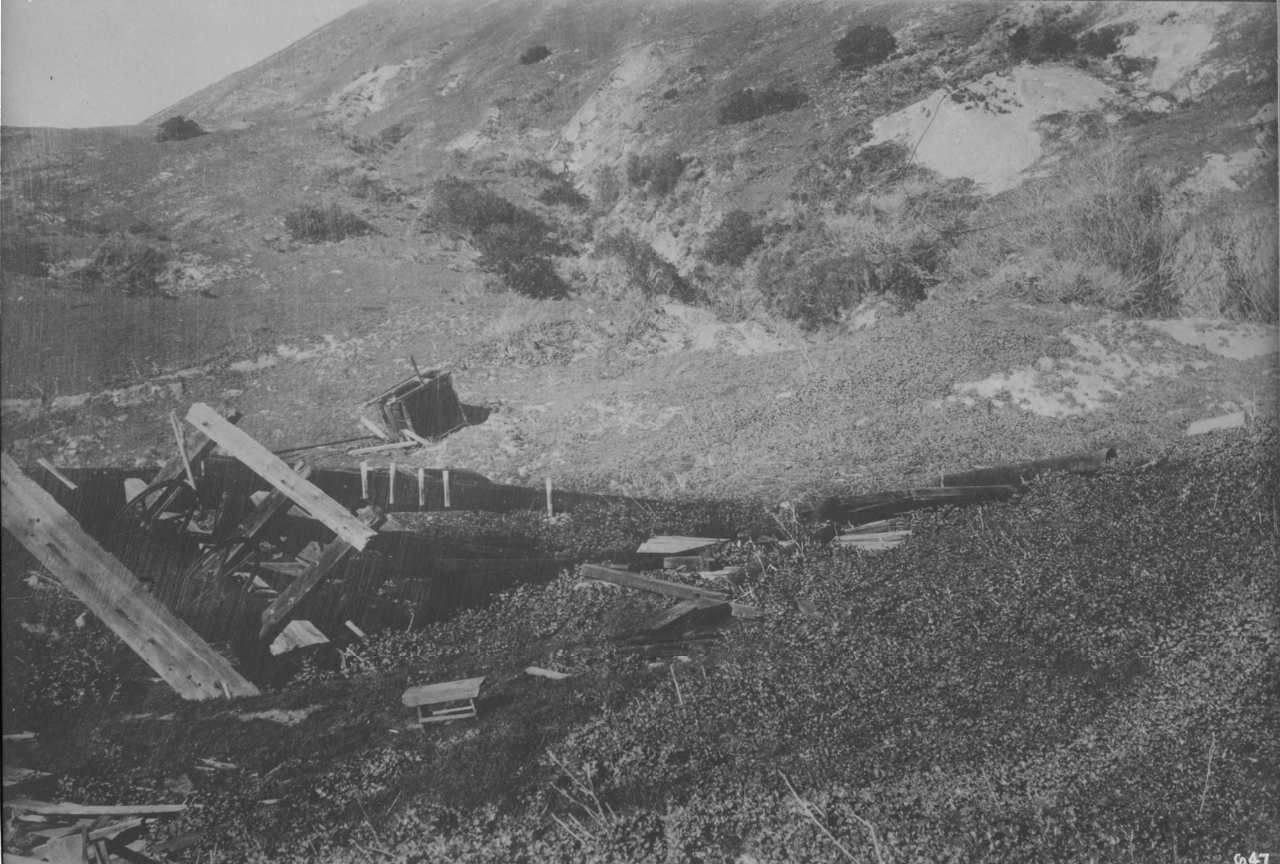
Remnants of the Carmelo Coal Company mine near Malpaso Creek in 1919.

Beds of coarse sand and conglomerate containing coal occur in Malpaso Creek. Malpaso creek is located in the Carmel Highlands, immediately south of Yankee Point. The creek forms a natural northern boundary of the Big Sur region.

In 1874, a seam of low grade bituminous coal was found in upper Malpaso Canyon. On September 6, 1888, shortly after ownership of the Rancho San Jose y Sur Chiquito was resolved by a court, almost all of the claimants banded together to form the Carmelo Land and Coal Company. A mine was dug into the mountain on the north bank of Malpaso Creek and the coal was transported on ore carts via a tramway to Coal Chute Point, opposite the Chinese settlement at Whaler's Cove on Point Lobos. The deep water allowed the workers to use the chute to deliver the coal directly to coastal steamers.

But by 1896, the coal mine was unprofitable. In 1897, Alexander MacMillan Allan, a successful race track architect and real estate developer from Pennsylvania, was hired to improve the coal mine operation. When he found the coal mine could not produce a profit, he purchased 640 acres (260 ha) of Point Lobos from the Carmelo Land and Coal Company in 1898.

== Fauna and flora ==
The creek was formerly the southern limit of fast-growing Monterey pine before the species was planted widely. Local distribution of Pelvetiopsis arborescens occurs in the rocks near the creek, as does Rhodophysema elegans var. polystromatica. Callophyllis linearis occurs on rocks north of the creek, Gloiopeltis furcata and Callophyllis crenulata occur near the creek, Dictyota binghamiae occurs at the 1 foot (0.30 m) tide level near the creek, and Fucus distichus subspecies edentatus f. abbreviatus occurs in the creek's exposed areas. Cucumaria curata has been found in tidepools on exposed rock areas near the creek.

Anglers fish for surfperch and rockfish along the creek's south shore.

== Highway 1 bridge ==
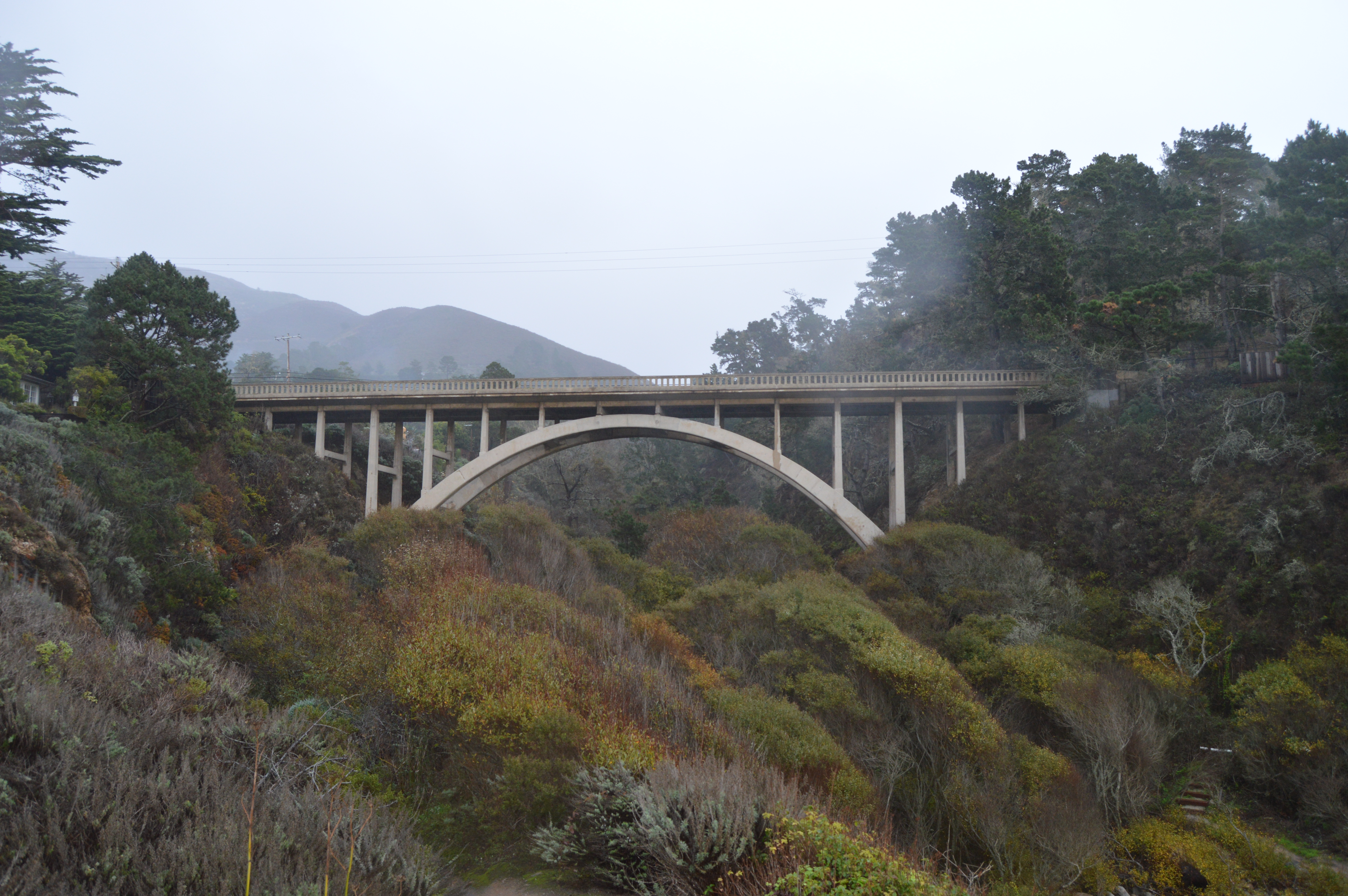
Highway 1 bridge over Malpaso Creek

Prior to the arrival of the Spanish, a foot trail along the coast was used by Native Americans. Rancho San José y Sur Chiquito was a 8,876-acre (35.92 km^{2}) Mexican land grant in present-day Big Sur, in Monterey County, California, given in 1835 to Teodoro Gonzalez and re-granted by Governor Juan Alvarado the same year to Marcelino Escobar. A hand-drawn map created c. 1853 accompanying the grant indicated a road or trail was already present along the coast. In 1870, Henry Bixby and his father hired men to improve the track and constructed the first wagon road including 23 bridges from the Carmel Mission to Bixby Creek. Near the coast, a trail and later a road ran from Carmel to Big Sur during the 1800s. The creek has very steep side slopes and there was only one crossing (a ford only 10 feet (3.0 m) above sea level) until the Malpaso Creek Bridge was built in 1935 as part of Highway 1.

Malpaso Creek Bridge (No. 44-17) was built at a cost of $24,000 in 1935 using a reinforced concrete open-spandrel arch design, similar to the famous Bixby Creek Bridge, located 8 miles (13 km) to the south. It is 210 feet (64 m) long and 24 feet (7.3 m) wide.

The bridge is situated 4.5 miles (7.2 km) south of the Carmel River on California State Route 1. Along with six other Monterey County bridges on Highway 1, Malpaso Creek Bridge was added to the National Register of Historic Places. As a group, the bridges are referred to as the Big Sur Arches and may be the best works example of the California Division of Highways' bridge department.

== In popular culture ==
While serving in the US Army at nearby Fort Ord, actor Clint Eastwood developed an interest in Carmel area real estate. With income from his growing acting career, on December 24, 1967, he bought five parcels totaling 283 acres (115 ha) of land on the south side of Malpaso Creek from Charles Sawyer along Highway 1 near Malpaso Creek, south of the Carmel Highlands.

He named his production company The Malpaso Company after the location. The company was established in 1967 by Eastwood's financial adviser Irving Leonard for the film Hang 'Em High, using profits from the Dollars Trilogy. He later bought more land until he owned 650 acres (260 ha). The land stretched from the eastern side of Highway 1 to the coastal ridge. In 1995, Monterey County bought the land from him for $3.08 million, despite the fact that in July 1994 the county assessor showed the land's assessed value as only $308,682. The county put a permanent conservation easement on the Malpaso property.
