= Rocky Creek Bridge =

Rocky Creek Bridge may refer to:

- Rocky Creek Bridge (Oregon), arch bridge (1927)
- Rocky Creek Bridge (California), arch bridge (1932)
