= Frederick W. Panhorst Bridge =

Russian Gulch Bridge
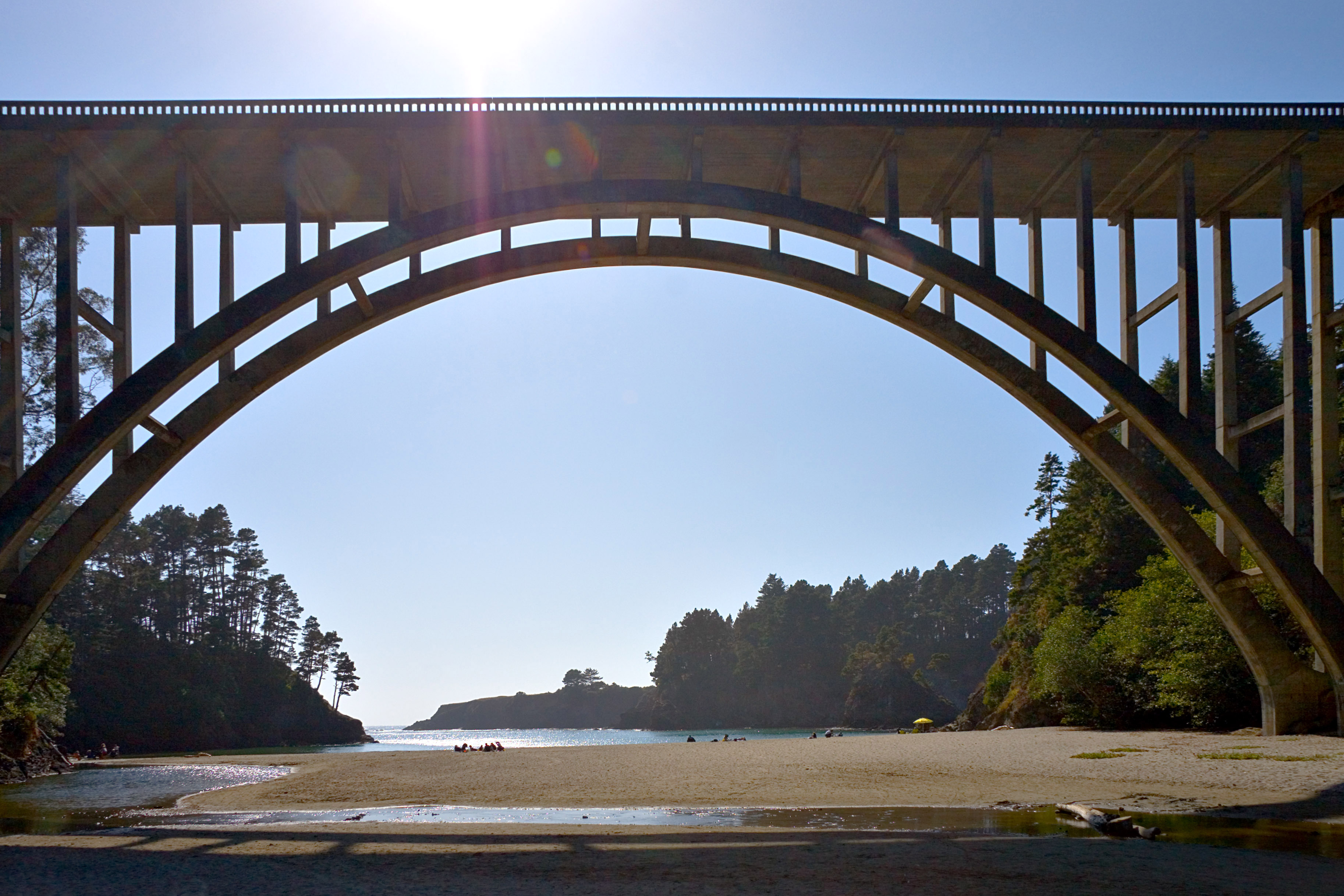
- The Frederick W. Panhorst Bridge, as seen from the beach in Russian Gulch State Park.
- Coordinates: 39°19′45″N 123°48′16.5″W
- Carries: SR 1
- Crosses: Russian Gulch Creek
- Locale: Russian Gulch State Park, Mendocino County, California, United States
- Official name: Frederick W. Panhorst Bridge
- Maintained by: California Department of Transportation
- ID number: CA 10-151, BH 11140

Characteristics
- Design: open-spandrel deck arch bridge
- Material: Reinforced concrete
- Total length: 160.6m
- Longest span: 73.2m
- No. of spans: 1

History
- Designer: Henry E. Kuphal
- Construction start: 1939
- Construction end: 1940

Location
- Interactive map of Russian Gulch Bridge

The Frederick W. Panhorst Bridge, more commonly known as the Russian Gulch Bridge, is a reinforced concrete open-spandrel deck arch bridge on California State Highway 1, spanning Russian Gulch Creek in Russian Gulch State Park, Mendocino County, California, United States. It is named after Frederick W. Panhorst, who served as the Chief of the Bridge Section of the California Division of Highways from 1931 to 1960.

== Design ==
The bridge was designed by Henry E. Kuphal. It is similar in design to the more famous Bixby Creek Bridge several hundred miles south on the same highway, but in contrast to the Bixby Creek Bridge, its arch is supported only by the two rocky headlands on either side without need for buttresses. Its main span is 73.2 m (240 ft) long, and its total length is 160.6 m (527 ft); it carries an average of 10,500 vehicles per day.

Two nearby bridges to the north in Jug Handle State Natural Reserve and across Hare Creek also have a similar open spandrel concrete deck arch design.

== History ==
Prior to the bridge's opening, traffic across the gulch was carried on a wooden trestle bridge, built in 1911, that was designed to support the weight of a 6-horse team but was inadequate for later motorized vehicle traffic.

The present bridge was constructed at the expense of US$109,000 from 1939 to 1940, and it was dedicated by governor Culbert Olson on June 9, 1940. In 1996–1998, the Russian Gulch Bridge and eleven other Mendocino County bridges underwent seismic retrofitting, at a total cost of US$9.7 million.

The Russian Gulch Bridge was renamed to be the Frederick W. Panhorst bridge in 1974, by California Senate Concurrent Resolution 145. Panhorst was Chief of the Bridge Section of the California Division of Highways from 1931 to 1960, and served as a director for the American Society of Civil Engineers.

== Evaluation ==
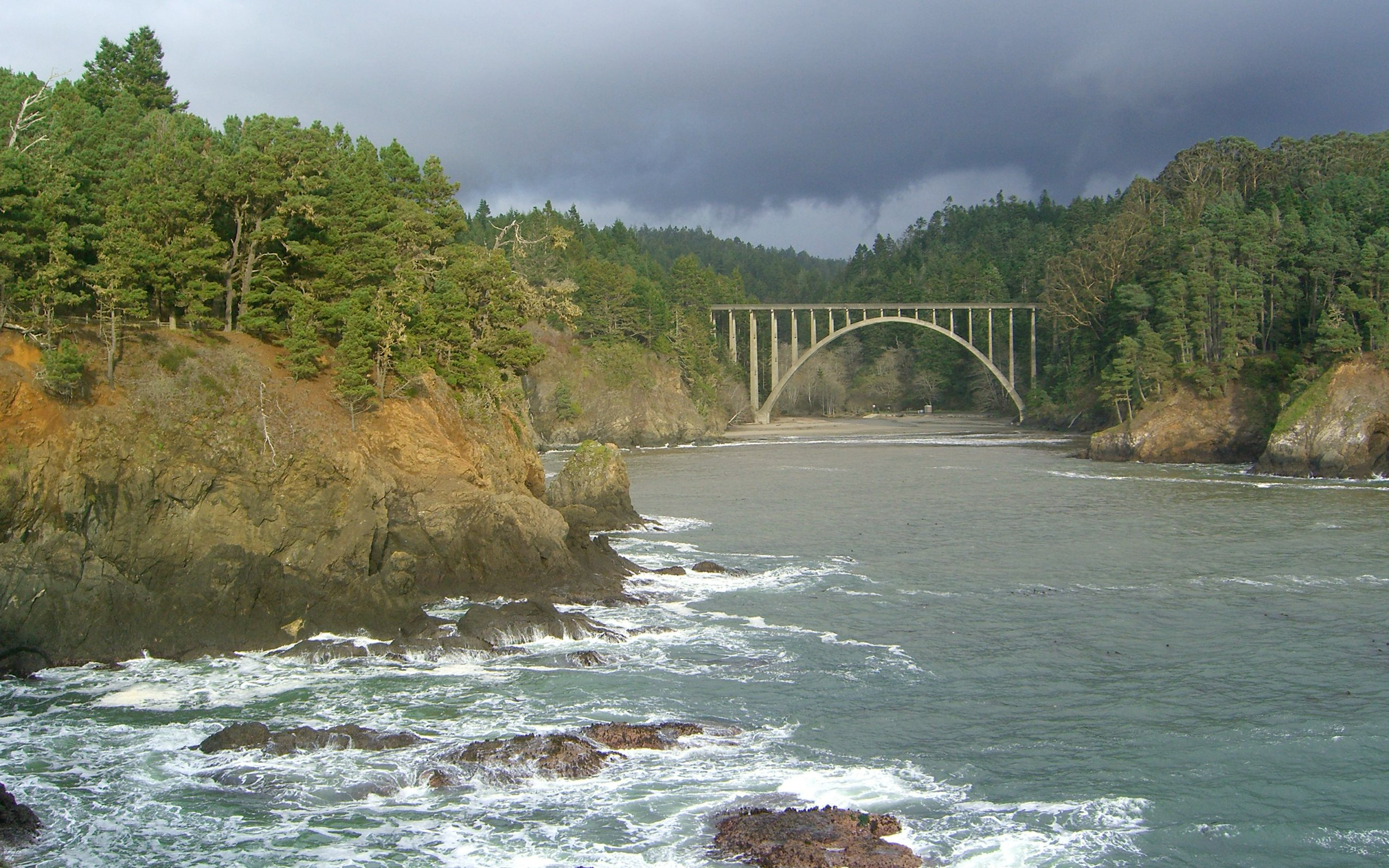
View of the bridge from the south headland in Russian Gulch State Park

Retired California bridge engineer Arthur Elliott considered the Russian Gulch Bridge to be the most beautiful of California's concrete arch bridges, and it is the frequent subject of photographs. The columns of the bridge are spaced more widely as they become longer, adding to its aesthetics. It is eligible for the National Register of Historic Places as the embodiment of a typical mid-20th-century open-spandrel concrete arch bridge, and as an example of the late-career work of Kuphal.

In 2007, Caltrans bridge engineer Barton Newton called the bridge "functionally obsolete" due to its narrow deck, but stated that the bridge was structurally sound.
