= Russian Gulch State Park =

State park in Mendocino County, California, United States

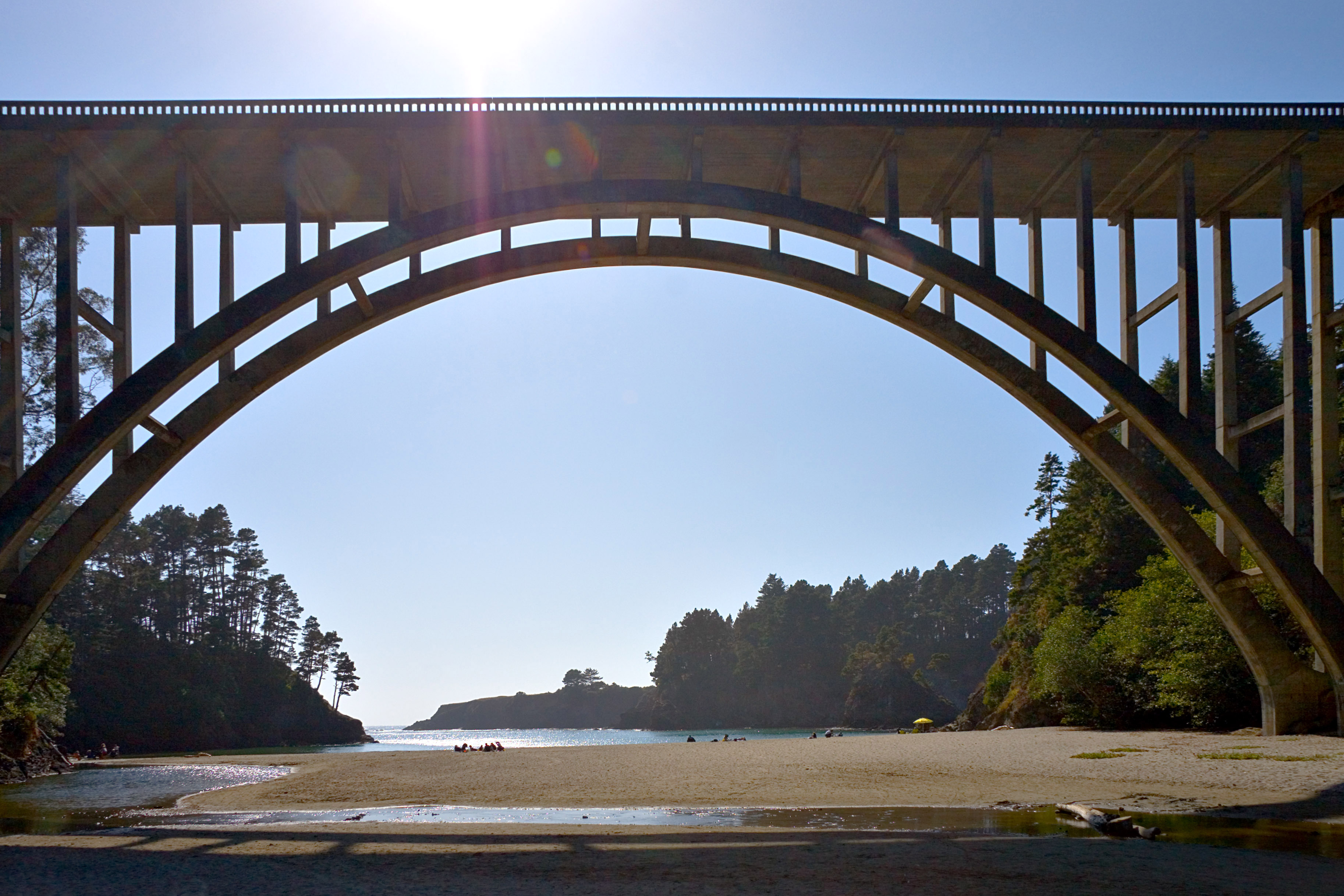
- The beach at Russian Gulch State Park, and the Frederick W. Panhorst Bridge above it

- Location within California Location within the United States
- Interactive map of Russian Gulch State Park
- Location: Mendocino County, California, United States
- Nearest city: Mendocino, California
- Coordinates: 39°20′N 123°47′W
- Governing body: California Department of Parks and Recreation

Russian Gulch State Park is a California State Park in coastal Mendocino County, California, 2 mi (3.2 km) north of Mendocino and 7 mi (11 km) south of Fort Bragg.

== Park features ==
The park features 7,630 ft (2,330 m) of rocky ocean shores; it is approximately .75 mi (1.21 km) wide from north to south at its widest point, and extends for approximately three miles from east to west. Russian Gulch is crossed by California State Highway 1, which passes over the gulch on the Frederick W. Panhorst Bridge, a large concrete arch bridge constructed in 1940. The park entrance is on the west side of Highway 1, north of the bridge, and connects by a one-lane road under the bridge to the eastern part of the park. The smaller, western portion of the park consists largely of headlands with a blowhole and picnic areas, while the larger eastern portion of the park includes a campground, the park headquarters, and several trails for bicycles, hikers, and horses. A 2.5 mi (4.0 km) hike from the trailhead at the east end of the campground to a 36 ft (11 m) waterfall largely follows an abandoned logging road along the creek. A small beach, physically in the western part of the park but accessed by a road from the eastern side, is equipped with a restroom and an outdoor shower; swimming, skin diving, fishing, and tide pool exploration are all possible.

== History ==
The name "Russian Gulch" was given to the area by U.S. government surveyors, in honor of the Russian fur trappers who founded Fort Ross 50 mi (80 km) to the south; according to a more specific local tradition, a deserter from Fort Ross lived at Russian Gulch. In the second half of the 19th century, schooners would frequently make dangerous stops in the cove to take on coast redwood lumber and passengers; the headlands still contain iron rings used to hold ropes and move lumber when these ships docked, and a mill made redwood shingles on what is now the site of a park recreation hall. Some of the land within what is now the park was farmed in the late 19th century, and in the mid-1920s a property developer from Los Angeles, F. O. Warner, bought land in the area with the intention of building a resort there. The Native Sons of the Golden West began a drive to turn the area into a park in 1928, and after funds were provided by A. Johnston, the county, and the state, the park was founded in 1933.

Russian Gulch was one of 70 state parks due for closure in 2012 due to state budget cuts.

== See also ==
- List of beaches in California
- List of California state parks
