= Hang 'Em High =

1968 film

- Theatrical release poster by Sandy Kossin
- Directed by: Ted Post
- Written by: Leonard Freeman; Mel Goldberg
- Produced by: Leonard Freeman
- Starring: Clint Eastwood; Inger Stevens; Ed Begley; Pat Hingle
- Cinematography: Richard H. Kline; Leonard J. South
- Edited by: Gene Fowler Jr.
- Music by: Dominic Frontiere
- Production companies: Leonard Freeman Productions; The Malpaso Company
- Distributed by: United Artists
- Release date: July 31, 1968
- Running time: 114 minutes
- Country: United States
- Language: English
- Budget: $1.6 million
- Box office: $10.8 million

Hang 'Em High is a 1968 American Western film directed by Ted Post and written by Leonard Freeman and Mel Goldberg. It stars Clint Eastwood as Jed Cooper, an innocent man who survives a lynching; Inger Stevens as a widow who helps him; Ed Begley as the leader of the gang that lynched Cooper; and Pat Hingle as the federal judge who hires him as a Deputy U.S. Marshal. It was the first production of The Malpaso Company, Eastwood's production company, as well as his first American film with a leading role.

Hingle portrays a fictional judge who mirrors Judge Isaac C. Parker, labeled the "Hanging Judge" due to the large number of men he sentenced to be executed during his service in the late 1800s as District Judge of the United States District Court for the Western District of Arkansas. The film also depicts the dangers of serving as a Deputy U.S. Marshal during that period, as many federal marshals were killed while serving under Parker. The fictional Fort Grant, base for operations for that district judge seat, is also a mirror of the factual Fort Smith, Arkansas, where Judge Parker's court was located.

== Plot ==
In Oklahoma Territory in 1889, retired lawman Jed Cooper is accused of rustling cattle by a posse of nine men: Captain Wilson, Reno, Miller, Jenkins, Stone, Maddow, Tommy, Loomis, and Charlie Blackfoot. When Cooper fails to produce a legitimate bill of sale, and is told the owner of the cattle was murdered, the posse hangs him, with only Jenkins objecting. Shortly afterwards, Marshal Dave Bliss rescues Cooper and takes him to Fort Grant. The actual rustler is caught and hanged; and territorial judge, Adam Fenton, sets Cooper free, but warns him not to take his revenge. As an alternative, Fenton offers Cooper a job as a marshal. Cooper accepts, and Fenton warns him not to kill the lynchers, but to bring them in for trial.

While picking up a prisoner, Cooper finds Reno inside a local saloon, and shoots him dead when Reno draws on him. Jenkins turns himself in, after learning of Reno’s death, promising to provide the names of other posse members. Cooper arrests Stone in the town of Red Creek. The sheriff promises to assist, but tells Cooper the posse members are respected citizens. He cites problems with his bad back as an excuse for not getting involved.

While en route to arrest the posse, Cooper is diverted by a report that three men killed a rancher and his son while rustling their cattle. One of the rustlers is Miller. The other two are teenaged brothers who admit stealing the cattle, but insist only Miller committed the murders. Cooper, alone, successfully escorts the three men to Fort Grant to the praises of Judge Fenton. All three are sentenced to hang, despite Cooper’s testimony that the brothers are not guilty of murder. Fenton justifies the hangings as a means of establishing statehood more quickly.

Sometime later, the surviving posse pays Cooper the money they stole from him; but, Cooper remains resolved to still bring them to justice. Blackfoot and Maddow flee, while Tommy and Loomis stick with Wilson and agree to help kill Cooper.

The three lynchers ambush Cooper in a brothel, seriously wounding him. Cooper is slowly nursed back to health by a widow, Rachel Warren. Rachel reveals she is hunting for the outlaws who killed her husband and raped her. She and Cooper begin an affair; he says that she might never find her rapists. Cooper tries to resign, but Judge Fenton gives him the location of Wilson's ranch, where Wilson, Tommy, and Loomis are hiding.

Cooper survives an ambush as he approaches Wilson's ranch house. He stabs Loomis to death, and shoots and kills Tommy. Cooper breaches the ranch house, and finds Wilson has hanged himself.

Returning to Fort Grant, Cooper hands in his marshal's star and demands that Fenton sign a pardon for Jenkins, who is both contrite and seriously ill. The two men debate the merits of territorial justice. Fenton insists that he is doing as well as he can, cursing the fact that his is the only court in the territory with little recourse for plaintiffs; and tells Cooper that if he disagrees with him, the best thing he can do is to help Oklahoma become a state (and thus get proper courts) by continuing to serve as a U.S. marshal. Cooper takes back his star in exchange for Jenkins's release. Fenton then gives Cooper fresh warrants for Blackfoot and Maddow, telling him, "The law still wants 'em." Cooper nods and rides off.

== Cast ==
- Clint Eastwood as Marshal Jedediah Cooper
- Inger Stevens as Rachel Warren
- Ed Begley as Captain Wilson
- Pat Hingle as Judge Adam Fenton
- Ben Johnson as Marshal Dave Bliss
- Charles McGraw as Sheriff Ray Calhoun
- Ruth White as Madame "Peaches" Sophie
- Bruce Dern as Miller
- Alan Hale Jr. as Matt Stone
- Arlene Golonka as Jennifer
- James Westerfield as Prisoner
- Dennis Hopper as The Prophet
- L. Q. Jones as Loomis
- Mark Lenard as the prosecutor
- Michael O'Sullivan as Francis Elroy Duffy
- Joseph Sirola as Reno
- James MacArthur as The Preacher
- Bob Steele as Jenkins
- Bert Freed as Schmidt, The Hangman
- Russell Thorson as Maddow
- Ned Romero as Charlie Blackfoot
- Jonathan Lippe as Tommy
- Roy Glenn as Prison Guard
- Michael Lembeck as Marvin the store clerk (uncredited)
- Bruce Scott as Billy Joe
- Rick Gates as Ben

== Production ==
Eastwood spent much of late 1966 and 1967 dubbing for the English-language version of the Dollars Trilogy and being interviewed, something which left him feeling angry and frustrated. Stardom brought more roles in the "tough guy" mould, and Irving Leonard, his business manager, gave him a script to a new film, the American revisionist Western Hang 'Em High, a cross between Rawhide and Leone's westerns, written by Mel Goldberg and produced by Leonard Freeman. However, the William Morris Agency had wanted him to star in a bigger picture, Mackenna's Gold, with a cast of notable actors such as Gregory Peck, Omar Sharif, and Telly Savalas. Eastwood, however, did not approve and preferred the script for Hang 'Em High, but had one complaint which he voiced to the producers: the scene before the six-man hanging, where the hero is attacked by the enemies. Eastwood believed that the scene would not be believable if set in a saloon. They eventually agreed to introduce a scene with Cooper taking a prostitute upstairs during the hanging, and having the attack take place afterwards as Eastwood enters the bordello's bar. Eastwood signed for the film with a salary of $400,000 and 25% of the net earnings of the film, playing the character of Jed Cooper, a man accused by vigilantes of a rancher's murder, lynched and left for dead, who later seeks revenge.

With the wealth generated by the Dollars trilogy, Irving Leonard helped set up Eastwood's long-desired new production company, The Malpaso Company, named after Malpaso Creek, which flows through property Eastwood owned at the time in Monterey County, California. Leonard became the company's president and arranged for Hang 'Em High to be a joint production with United Artists. Directors Robert Aldrich and John Sturges were considered as director, but on the request of Eastwood, old friend Ted Post was brought in to direct. He was signed against the wishes of Freeman, whom Eastwood overruled. Post was important in casting for the film and arranged for Inger Stevens of The Farmer's Daughter fame to play the role of Rachel Warren. She had not heard of Eastwood or Sergio Leone at the time, but instantly took a liking to Eastwood and accepted. Clint Eastwood and Inger Stevens began a short relationship during filming.

=== Score ===
Composer Dominic Frontiere was given eight days to compose an Ennio Morricone type score. His theme appeared in a large number of cover versions ranging from Hugo Montenegro to Booker T and the M.G.s.

=== Filming ===
Although the film is purportedly set in Oklahoma Territory, Freeman arrived in Las Cruces, New Mexico, on May 25, 1967, to scout locations. That same day, Freeman located the tree to be used for the hanging in the opening scene, about 12 miles (19 km) north of Las Cruces. Filming began June 27, 1967, in the Las Cruces area, with additional scenes shot at White Sands. The interiors were shot at MGM studios. The opening lynching scene was filmed June 29, 1967, next to the Rio Grande. The tree used for the hanging is no longer standing and the riverbed is now overgrown with thick brush. Eastwood had considerable leeway in the production, especially in the script, which was altered in parts such as the dialogue and setting of the barroom scene to his liking.

== Reception ==
The film became a major success after release in August 1968, and with an opening-day revenue of $5,241 in Baltimore alone, it became the biggest United Artists opening in history, exceeding all of the James Bond films at that time. It debuted at number five on Variety's weekly survey of top films and had recouped production expenses within two weeks of screening. It eventually grossed $6.8 million in the United States and $4 million abroad, for a total of $10.8 million worldwide.

It was praised by critics, including Arthur Winsten of the New York Post, who described Hang 'Em High as "a Western of quality, courage, danger and excitement." And Roger Ebert who said, "In a way, it's a relief that Clint Eastwood is back home again." Variety gave the film a negative review, calling it "a poor American-made imitation of a poor Italian-made imitation of an American-made western." George Tashman wrote in Berkeley Gazette that it was, "all intents and purposes," an "apple pie" western, "a Spaghetti Western made in Hollywood."

As of July 2026, Hang 'Em High has a 93% freshness rating with a mean of 6.7 of a possible 10 on Rotten Tomatoes from 15 reviews.

== Legacy ==
The song "Hang 'Em High" by American rock band My Chemical Romance is named after the film.

== See also ==
- List of American films of 1968

== Bibliography ==
- Hughes, Howard (2009). Aim for the Heart. London: I.B. Tauris. ISBN 978-1-84511-902-7.
- McGilligan, Patrick (1999). Clint: The Life and Legend. Perseus Books Group. ISBN 978-0-7867-0843-7.
- Munn, Michael (1992). Clint Eastwood: Hollywood's Loner. London: Robson Books. ISBN 0-86051-790-X.
