= Malpaso Productions =

Film production company

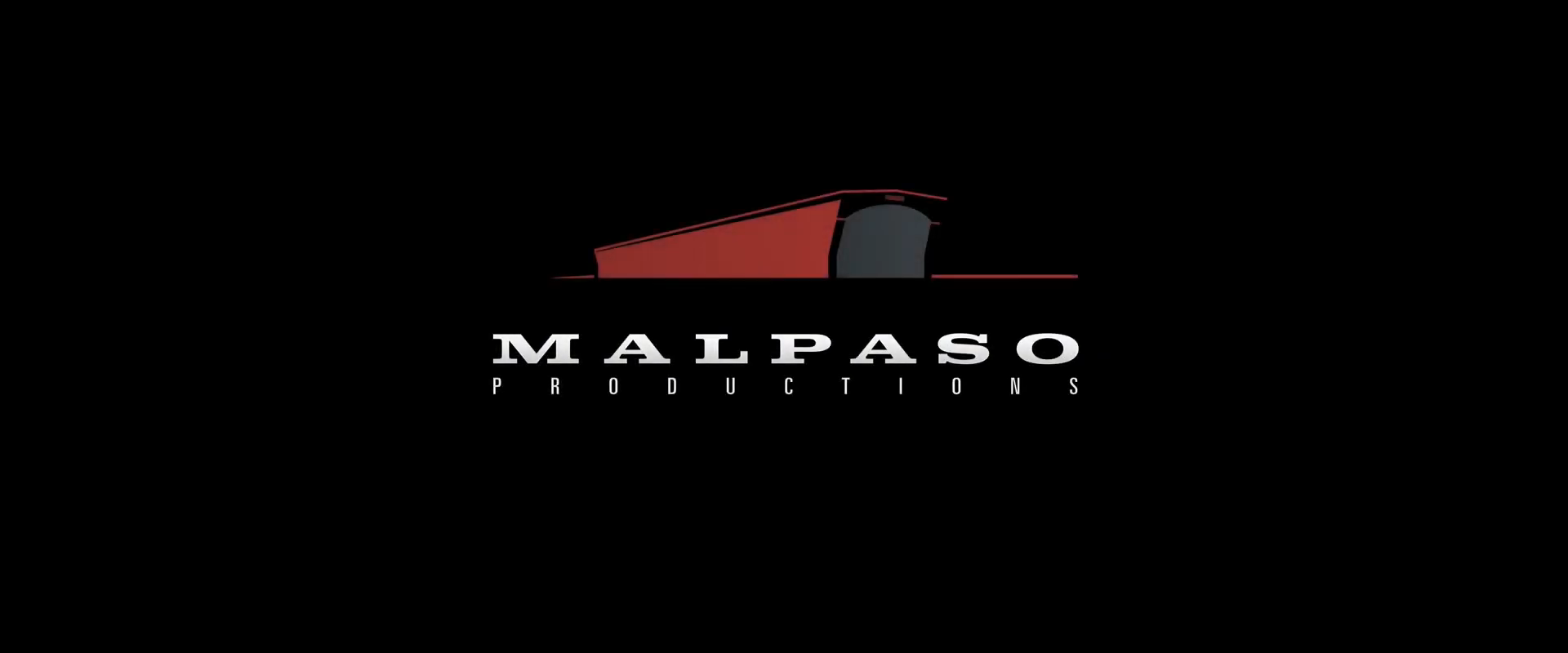
- Logo used since 2024
- Type: Private
- Industry: Film
- Founded: 1967; 59 years ago
- Founder: Irving Leonard; Clint Eastwood
- Headquarters: Burbank, California, United States
- Key people: Clint Eastwood; Robert Lorenz; David Valdes; Fritz Manes; Robert Daley; Keith Dillin
- Products: Motion pictures
- Services: Film production

Malpaso Productions is Clint Eastwood's production company. It was established in 1967 as The Malpaso Company by Eastwood's financial adviser Irving Leonard for the film Hang 'Em High (1968), using profits from the Dollars Trilogy. Leonard served as President of the Malpaso Company until his death on December 13, 1969.

== Name origins ==
The name is derived from Malpaso Creek (Spanish for "bad step", or "misstep"), located south of Carmel-by-the-Sea, California. Eastwood had received U.S. Army basic training at nearby Fort Ord, where he remained as a lifeguard until discharged in 1953. On December 24, 1967, Eastwood bought five parcels totaling 283 acres (115 ha) of land along Malpaso Creek from Charles Sawyer. He later added more land until he owned 650 acres (260 ha). The land bordered the south bank of Malpaso Creek from the eastern side of Highway 1 to the coastal ridge. He sold it to Monterey County in 1995 for $3.08 million. Near the coast, a trail and later a road ran from Carmel to Big Sur during the 1800s. The creek has very steep side slopes and there was only one crossing (a ford only 10 feet (3.0 m) above sea level) until the Malpaso Creek Bridge was built in 1935 as part of Highway 1.

== Founding ==
When Eastwood agreed to take the role of The Man with No Name in A Fistful of Dollars in 1964, his agent told him that it would be a "bad step" for his career. The Dollars Trilogy was surprisingly successful. After filming Where Eagles Dare in 1968, Eastwood grew annoyed about the money he considered wasted during these big productions. He wanted more creative control over his films and decided to form his own production company. He thought the choice of "Malpaso" was appropriate.

Irving Leonard, Eastwood's financial adviser, organized the company for Eastwood following the success of and using the earnings from the Dollars Trilogy. The first feature they produced was the 1968 film Hang 'Em High. Leonard served as President of the Malpaso Company and associate producer of Eastwood's films from Hang 'Em High until his death in 1969.

Eastwood is known for very tight shooting schedules, finishing his films on schedule and on budget, or earlier and under budget, typically in much less time than most production companies.

Malpaso is unique among film production companies for its over-fifty year relationship with one distributor. Warner Bros. Pictures has served as the distributor of many of Clint Eastwood's produced, directed and starred films, a relationship that has lasted for over half a century and resulted in more than 40 features.

== Filmography ==
=== 1960s ===
Year	Title	Director	Distributor	Names	Notes
1968	Hang 'Em High	Ted Post	United Artists	The Malpaso Company	co-production with Leonard Freeman Productions; first film
1968	Coogan's Bluff	Don Siegel	Universal Pictures	The Malpaso Company	
1969	Paint Your Wagon	Joshua Logan	Paramount Pictures	The Malpaso Company	top production billing went to Alan Jay Lerner Productions

=== 1970s ===
Year	Title	Director	Distributor	Names	Notes
1970	Two Mules for Sister Sara	Don Siegel	Universal Pictures	The Malpaso Company	co-production with Sanen Productions
1971	The Beguiled	Don Siegel	Universal Pictures	The Malpaso Company	co-production with Jennings Lang Productions
1971	Play Misty for Me	Clint Eastwood	Universal Pictures	The Malpaso Company	co-production with Jennings Lang Productions
1971	Dirty Harry	Don Siegel	Warner Bros. Pictures	The Malpaso Company	
1972	Joe Kidd	John Sturges	Universal Pictures	The Malpaso Company	
1973	High Plains Drifter	Clint Eastwood	Universal Pictures	The Malpaso Company	
1973	Breezy	Clint Eastwood	Universal Pictures	The Malpaso Company	
1973	Magnum Force	Ted Post	Warner Bros. Pictures	The Malpaso Company	
1974	Thunderbolt and Lightfoot	Michael Cimino	United Artists	The Malpaso Company	
1975	The Eiger Sanction	Clint Eastwood	Universal Pictures	The Malpaso Company	co-production with Zanuck/Brown Productions
1976	The Outlaw Josey Wales	Clint Eastwood	Warner Bros. Pictures	The Malpaso Company	
1976	The Enforcer	James Fargo	Warner Bros. Pictures	The Malpaso Company	
1977	The Gauntlet	Clint Eastwood	Warner Bros. Pictures	The Malpaso Company	
1978	Every Which Way But Loose	James Fargo	Warner Bros. Pictures	The Malpaso Company	
1979	Escape from Alcatraz	Don Siegel	Paramount Pictures	The Malpaso Company	

=== 1980s ===
Year	Title	Director	Distributor	Names	Notes
1980	Any Which Way You Can	Buddy Van Horn	Warner Bros. Pictures	The Malpaso Company	
1982	Firefox	Clint Eastwood	Warner Bros. Pictures	The Malpaso Company	
1982	Honkytonk Man	Clint Eastwood	Warner Bros. Pictures	The Malpaso Company	
1983	Sudden Impact	Clint Eastwood	Warner Bros. Pictures	The Malpaso Company	
1984	Tightrope	Richard Tuggle	Warner Bros. Pictures	The Malpaso Company	uncredited scenes directed by Clint Eastwood
1984	City Heat	Richard Benjamin	Warner Bros. Pictures	The Malpaso Company	
1985	Pale Rider	Clint Eastwood	Warner Bros. Pictures	The Malpaso Company	
1986	Heartbreak Ridge	Clint Eastwood	Warner Bros. Pictures	The Malpaso Company	
1986	Ratboy	Sondra Locke	Warner Bros. Pictures	The Malpaso Company	
1988	The Dead Pool	Buddy Van Horn	Warner Bros. Pictures	Malpaso Productions	
1988	Bird	Clint Eastwood	Warner Bros. Pictures	The Malpaso Company	
1988	Thelonious Monk: Straight, No Chaser	Charlotte Zwerin	Warner Bros. Pictures	Malpaso Productions	
1989	Pink Cadillac	Buddy Van Horn	Warner Bros. Pictures	Malpaso Productions	

=== 1990s ===
Year	Title	Director	Distributor	Names	Notes
1990	White Hunter, Black Heart	Clint Eastwood	Warner Bros. Pictures	Malpaso Productions	
1990	The Rookie	Clint Eastwood	Warner Bros. Pictures	Malpaso Productions	
1992	Unforgiven	Clint Eastwood	Warner Bros. Pictures	Malpaso Productions	
1993	A Perfect World	Clint Eastwood	Warner Bros. Pictures	Malpaso Productions	co-production with Mark Johnson Productions
1995	The Bridges of Madison County	Clint Eastwood	Warner Bros. Pictures	Malpaso Productions	co-production with Amblin Entertainment
1995	The Stars Fell on Henrietta	James Keach	Warner Bros. Pictures	Malpaso Productions	
1997	Absolute Power	Clint Eastwood	Sony Pictures Releasing	Malpaso Productions	co-production with Columbia Pictures and Castle Rock Entertainment
1997	Midnight in the Garden of Good and Evil	Clint Eastwood	Warner Bros. Pictures	Malpaso Productions	co-production with Silver Pictures
1999	True Crime	Clint Eastwood	Warner Bros. Pictures	Malpaso Productions	co-production with The Zanuck Company

=== 2000s ===
Year	Title	Director	Distributor	Names	Notes
2000	Space Cowboys	Clint Eastwood	Warner Bros. Pictures	Malpaso Productions	co-production with Mad Chance Productions, Village Roadshow Pictures and Clipsal Films
2002	Blood Work	Clint Eastwood	Warner Bros. Pictures	Malpaso Productions	
2003	Mystic River	Clint Eastwood	Warner Bros. Pictures	Malpaso Productions	co-production with Village Roadshow Pictures and NPV Entertainment
2004	Million Dollar Baby	Clint Eastwood	Warner Bros. Pictures	Malpaso Productions	co-production with Lakeshore Entertainment
2006	Flags of Our Fathers	Clint Eastwood	Paramount Pictures/Warner Bros. Pictures	Malpaso Productions	co-production with DreamWorks Pictures and Amblin Entertainment
2006	Letters from Iwo Jima	Clint Eastwood	Warner Bros. Pictures	Malpaso Productions	co-production with DreamWorks Pictures and Amblin Entertainment
2007	Rails & Ties	Alison Eastwood	Warner Bros. Pictures	Malpaso Productions	
2008	Changeling	Clint Eastwood	Universal Pictures	Malpaso Productions	co-production with Relativity Media and Imagine Entertainment
2008	Gran Torino	Clint Eastwood	Warner Bros. Pictures	Malpaso Productions	co-production with Village Roadshow Pictures
2009	Invictus	Clint Eastwood	Warner Bros. Pictures	Malpaso Productions	co-production with Spyglass Entertainment

=== 2010s ===
Year	Title	Director	Distributor	Names	Notes
2010	Hereafter	Clint Eastwood	Warner Bros. Pictures	Malpaso Productions	co-production with Amblin Entertainment and The Kennedy/Marshall Company
2011	J. Edgar	Clint Eastwood	Warner Bros. Pictures	Malpaso Productions	co-production with Imagine Entertainment and Wintergreen Productions
2012	Trouble with the Curve	Robert Lorenz	Warner Bros. Pictures	Malpaso Productions	
2014	Jersey Boys	Clint Eastwood	Warner Bros. Pictures	Malpaso Productions	co-production with RatPac-Dune Entertainment and GK Films
2014	American Sniper	Clint Eastwood	Warner Bros. Pictures	Malpaso Productions	co-production with Village Roadshow Pictures, RatPac-Dune Entertainment, Mad Chance Productions and 22nd & Indiana Pictures
2016	Sully	Clint Eastwood	Warner Bros. Pictures	Malpaso Productions	co-production with Village Roadshow Pictures, RatPac-Dune Entertainment, Flashlight Films, The Kennedy/Marshall Company and Orange Corp
2018	The 15:17 to Paris	Clint Eastwood	Warner Bros. Pictures	Malpaso Productions	co-production with Village Roadshow Pictures and RatPac-Dune Entertainment
2018	The Mule	Clint Eastwood	Warner Bros. Pictures	Malpaso Productions	co-production with Imperative Entertainment and Bron Creative
2019	Richard Jewell	Clint Eastwood	Warner Bros. Pictures	Malpaso Productions	co-production with Appian Way Productions, Misher Films and 75 Year Plan Productions

=== 2020s ===
Year	Title	Director	Distributor	Names	Notes
2021	Cry Macho	Clint Eastwood	Warner Bros. Pictures	Malpaso Productions	
2024	Juror #2	Clint Eastwood	Warner Bros. Pictures	Malpaso Productions	co-production with Dichotomy and Gotham Group
