= Irving Leonard (financial adviser) =

American film producer and financial adviser

- Born: December 28, 1915; United States
- Died: December 13, 1969 (aged 53)
- Occupation: Financial adviser

Irving Leonard (December 28, 1915 – December 13, 1969) was an American financial adviser to Hollywood film stars of the 1950s and 1960s and an associate film producer.

== Career ==
Leonard began as a cost accountant in Washington, D.C., and later moved into the film industry. Among his notable clients were James Garner and Clint Eastwood. He was arguably the most responsible for launching Eastwood's career in the late 1950s and 1960s and whom Eastwood described as being "like a second father to me". Leonard, described by Richard Schickel as "a small fastidious man" and a "lightning calculator", closely advised Eastwood on his finances, career moves and even personal purchases such as cars and houses, right from the mid-1950s through to their planning of the film Play Misty for Me in the winter of his death in 1969, Eastwood's directorial debut. It was Leonard who did the groundwork in establishing Eastwood's The Malpaso Company for the film Hang 'Em High in 1967, using the earnings from the Dollars Trilogy. Leonard had served as President of the Malpaso Company and associate producer of Eastwood's films from Hang 'Em High until his death.

Patrick McGilligan, who wrote a 1999 biography of Eastwood, describes Leonard as follows:

During the ebb and flow of agents, Leonard and Frank Wells took over the negotiating of Clint's contracts. Together they pioneered unique clauses, including structuring Clint's earnings to avoid paying undue taxes.... Leonard was someone in the Eastwood family tradition who stressed savings, prudent investment and long-range consolidation. He specialized in creating trust and pension funds for his clients. And above all, Leonard was wily about devising imaginative contract perks and bonuses – the perdiems and extras that would increasingly be seen by Clint as indispensable icing on the cake. Leonard's clients were expected to turn over their entire salary cheques to him and let him handle one hundred percent of their business transactions. Notoriously frugal, he then doled out personal allowances to clients that were strictly enforced... And he [Eastwood] loved the fact that Leonard was a pit bull about money, more of a tightwad than him.

Leonard died shortly before Christmas 1969, aged 53. Friends of Eastwood say he was never as devastated in his life as to when he heard the news of Leonard's passing. Leonard had employed two bookkeepers, Roy Kaufman and Howard Berstein, who after his death formed a new entity, Kaufman and Bernstein Inc., and continued to handle Eastwood's portfolio.

== Bibliography ==
- McGilligan, Patrick (1999). Clint: The Life and Legend. London: HarperCollins. ISBN 0-00-638354-8.
- Schickel, Richard (1996). Clint Eastwood: A Biography. New York: Knopf. ISBN 978-0-679-42974-6.
