= Rocky Creek Bridge (California) =

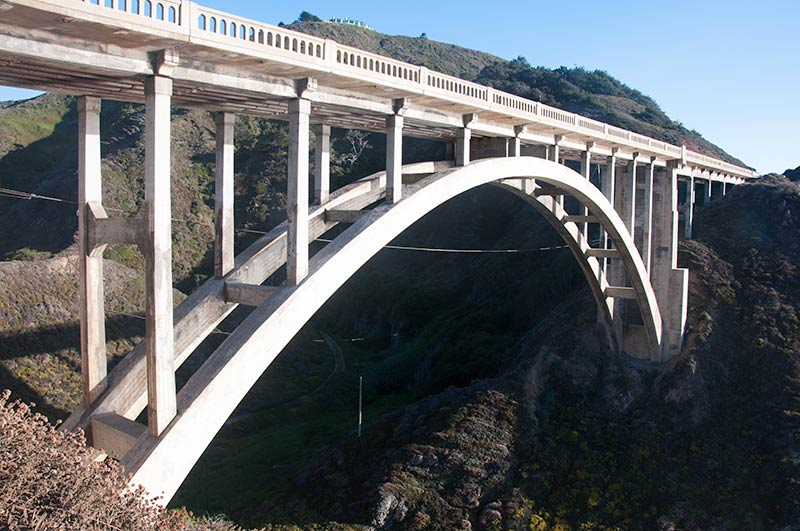
- Coordinates: 36°22′46″N 121°54′08″W
- Carries: SR 1
- Crosses: Rocky Creek
- Locale: Big Sur; Monterey County
- Maintained by: Caltrans
- ID number: 44 0036

Characteristics
- Design: open-spandrel deck arch bridge
- Material: Reinforced concrete
- Total length: 497.1 feet (151.5 m)
- Longest span: 239 feet (73 m)

History
- Construction end: 1932

Location
- Interactive map of Rocky Creek Bridge

Rocky Creek Bridge is a 497.0 feet (151.5 m) long reinforced concrete open-spandrel arch bridge on the Big Sur coast of California, featuring a reinforced-concrete, open-spandrel, fixed, parabolic-arch, a decorative cantilevered walkway, and reinforced-concrete railings in an arched-window design. It is located in Monterey County, on State Route 1 (Cabrillo Highway) about 12 miles (19 km) south of the city of Carmel, and about a mile north of the more famous Bixby Creek Bridge. The bridge's main arch is 239 feet (73 m) long.

Rocky Creek Bridge is one of seven similar bridges along State Route 1 known as the Big Sur Arches. It provides important crossings for the Carmel-San Simeon Highway, originally State Route 56 (now State Route 1). As its name implies, it spans Rocky Creek. A turnout with limited parking space exists to the northwest of the bridge, for tourist use.

The ecology in the vicinity is noteworthy in that the marine waters at the mouth of Rocky Creek are a habitat for the endangered southern sea otter, E. l. nereis. Additionally, on a ridge above Rocky Creek is one of the few known habitats of Yadon's piperia, a North American rare and endangered species of orchid.

== History ==
The bridge was built in 1932.

In 2000, the bridge underwent a retrofitting project as part of the Caltrans Phase II Seismic Retrofit Program.

On March 30 2024, a landslide occurred near the bridge resulting in a year-long closure after the southbound lane was damaged. The bridge itself was undamaged, but the road next to it was resulting in stabilisation works being required.
