= Bixby Creek (Michigan) =

Location
- Country: United States

Physical characteristics
- Source
  - location: Michigan
- Mouth
  - coordinates: 44°26′00″N 84°06′57″W

Bixby Creek is a stream in the U.S. state of Michigan.

== See also ==
- List of rivers of Michigan
