= Bixby Bridge =

Highway bridge on the Big Sur Coast of California

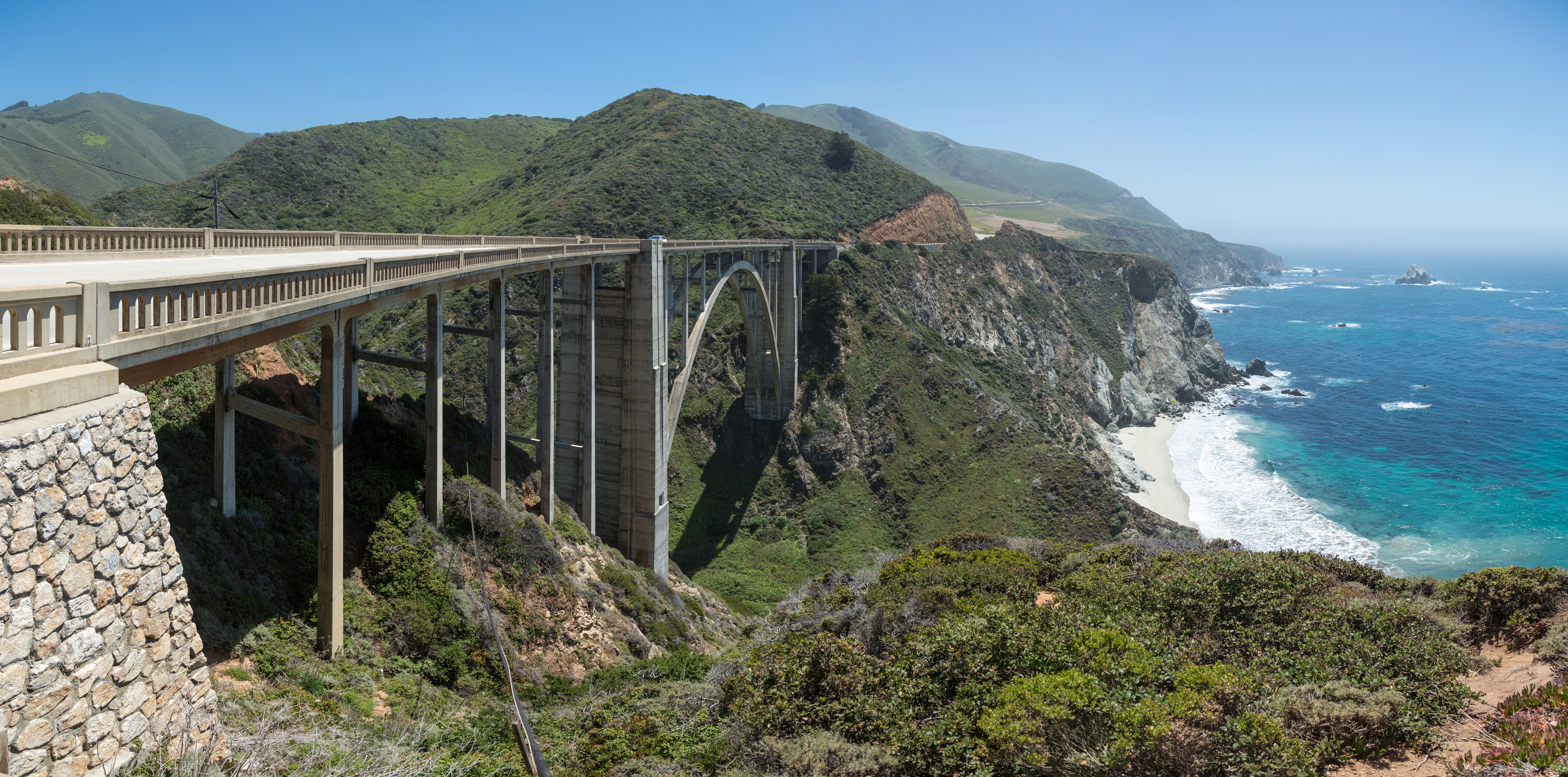
- Bixby Bridge from its northern end
- Coordinates: 36°22′17″N 121°54′07″W
- Carries: SR 1
- Crosses: Bixby Creek
- Locale: Big Sur; Monterey County
- Owner: State of California
- Maintained by: California Department of Transportation
- ID number: 44 0019

Characteristics
- Design: reinforced concrete open-spandrel arch bridge
- Total length: 714 feet (218 m)
- Width: 24 feet (7 m)
- Height: 280 feet (85 m)
- Longest span: 360 feet (110 m)
- Clearance below: 260 feet (79 m)

History
- Construction start: August 24, 1931
- Construction end: October 15, 1932
- Opened: November 27, 1932 (93 years ago)

Statistics
- Daily traffic: 4,500

Location
- Interactive map of Bixby Bridge

Bixby Bridge, also known as Bixby Creek Bridge, on the Big Sur coast of California, is one of the most photographed bridges in California due to its aesthetic design, "graceful architecture and magnificent setting". It is a reinforced concrete open-spandrel arch bridge. The bridge is 120 miles (190 km) south of San Francisco and 13 miles (21 km) south of Carmel in Monterey County on State Route 1.

Before the opening of the bridge in 1932, residents of the Big Sur area were virtually cut off during winter due to blockages on the often impassable Old Coast Road, which led 11 miles (18 km) inland. The bridge was built under budget for $199,861 (equivalent to $3.84 million in 2025 dollars) and, at 360 feet (110 m), was the longest concrete arch span in the California State Highway System. When it was completed, it was the highest single-span arch bridge in the world, and it remains one of the tallest.

The land north and south of the bridge was privately owned until 1988 and 2001. A logging company obtained approval to harvest redwood on the former Bixby Ranch to the north in 1986, and in 2000 a developer obtained approval to subdivide the former Brazil Ranch to the south. Local residents and conservationists fought their plans, and both pieces of land were eventually acquired by local and federal government agencies. A $20 million seismic retrofit was completed in 1996, although its 24-foot (7.3 m) width does not meet modern standards requiring bridges to be 32 feet (9.8 m) wide.

== Location ==
The bridge is "one of the most photographed features on the West Coast" and in the world. It has been featured on "postcards, TV ads, everywhere," according to Debra Geiler, project manager for the Trust for Public Land. The bridge's location on the scenic Central Coast of California, the parabolic shape of the arch, the tall spandrel columns, and the architectural piers contribute to an "intense aesthetic experience." "It's the gateway to Big Sur and the interior has never been logged. The land is pristine." Zad Leavy, former executive director of the Big Sur Land Trust, described the land as "the most spectacular meeting of ocean and land in the entire United States."

== Characteristics ==
The bridge is 714 feet (218 m) in total length and 24 feet (7.3 m) wide, with 260 feet (79 m) of clearance below, and has a main span of 360 feet (110 m), which places 50% of the total roadbed above the arch. The arch ribs are five feet thick at the deck and nine feet thick at the springing line, where they join the towers at their base. The arches are four and one-half feet wide. The bridge was designed to support more than six times its intended load.

The two large, vertical buttresses or supporting pillars on either side of the arch, while aesthetically pleasing, are functionally unnecessary. Engineers of later arch bridges such as the Frederick W. Panhorst Bridge omitted them from the design. The Rocky Creek Bridge and the Malpaso Creek Bridge to the north are also open-spandrel arch bridges built of reinforced concrete.

== Construction ==
The state first began building Route 56, or the Carmel–San Simeon Highway, in 1919. A number of bridges needed to be constructed, the largest among them across Bixby Creek.

=== Bridge design ===
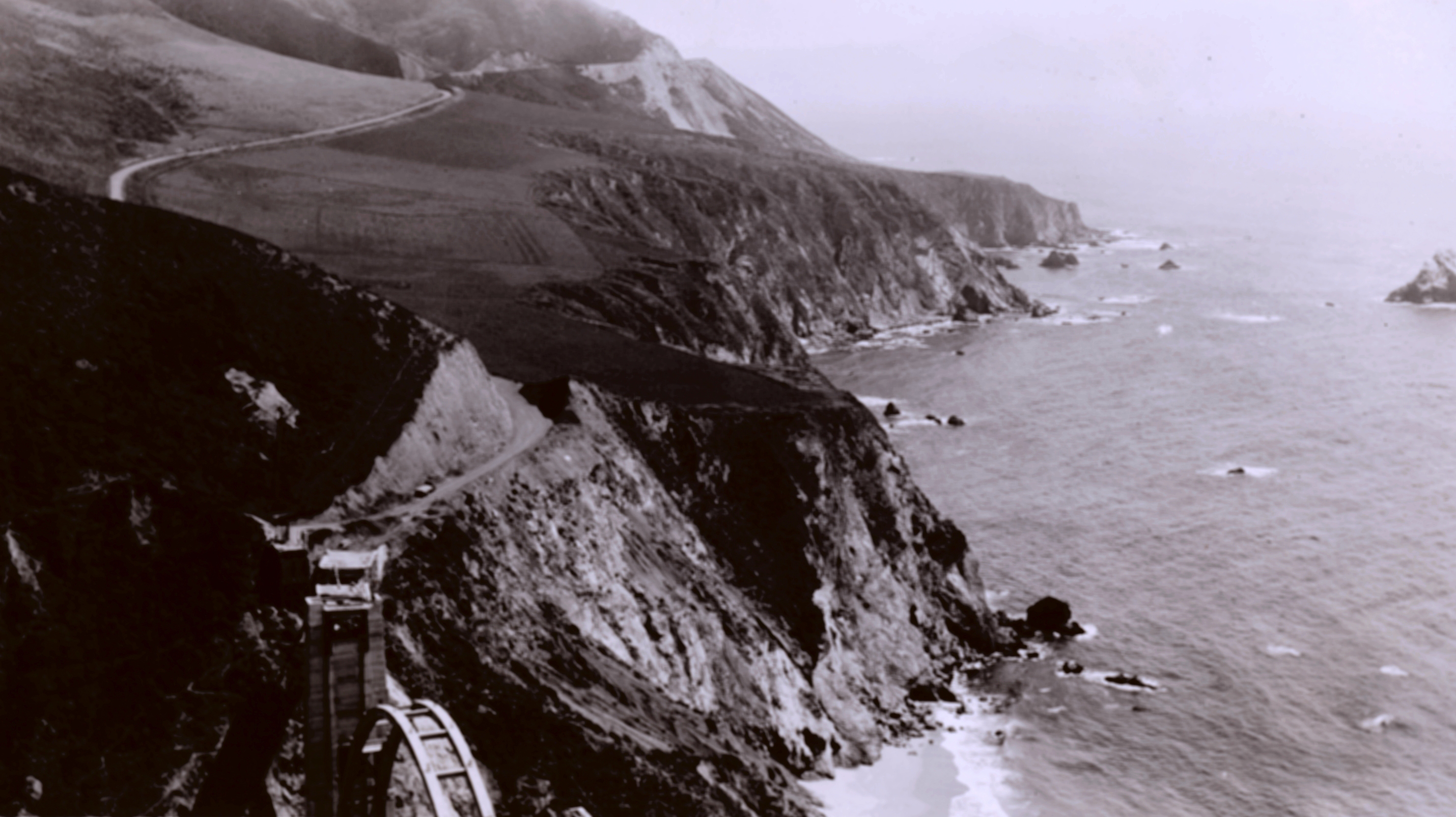
Bixby Bridge under construction, 1932

State engineers considered two alternatives to crossing the creek, an inland route and a smaller bridge, or a coastal location and a larger bridge. The inland route would have needed an 890-foot (270 m) tunnel cut through the Santa Lucia Mountains to a 250-foot (76 m) bridge upstream. The engineers selected the coastal route because it was safer, more scenic, and least affected the environment.

California state highway engineer C. H. Purcell and bridge engineer and designer F. W. Panhorst considered whether to build a steel or concrete span. A steel bridge would cost more to build and maintain, as the sea air would require expensive ongoing maintenance and painting. A steel bridge was also less in keeping with the natural environment. Using concrete reduced material costs and allowed more of the total cost to be paid to workers, which was a positive aspect of the design during the Depression. They chose concrete in part because it would not only reduce both construction and maintenance costs but would also echo the color and composition of the natural rock cliff formations in the area.

The state awarded a contract for $203,334 to the lower bidder, Ward Engineering Company of San Francisco, on August 13, 1931. Construction began on August 24, 1931.

=== Design and materials ===
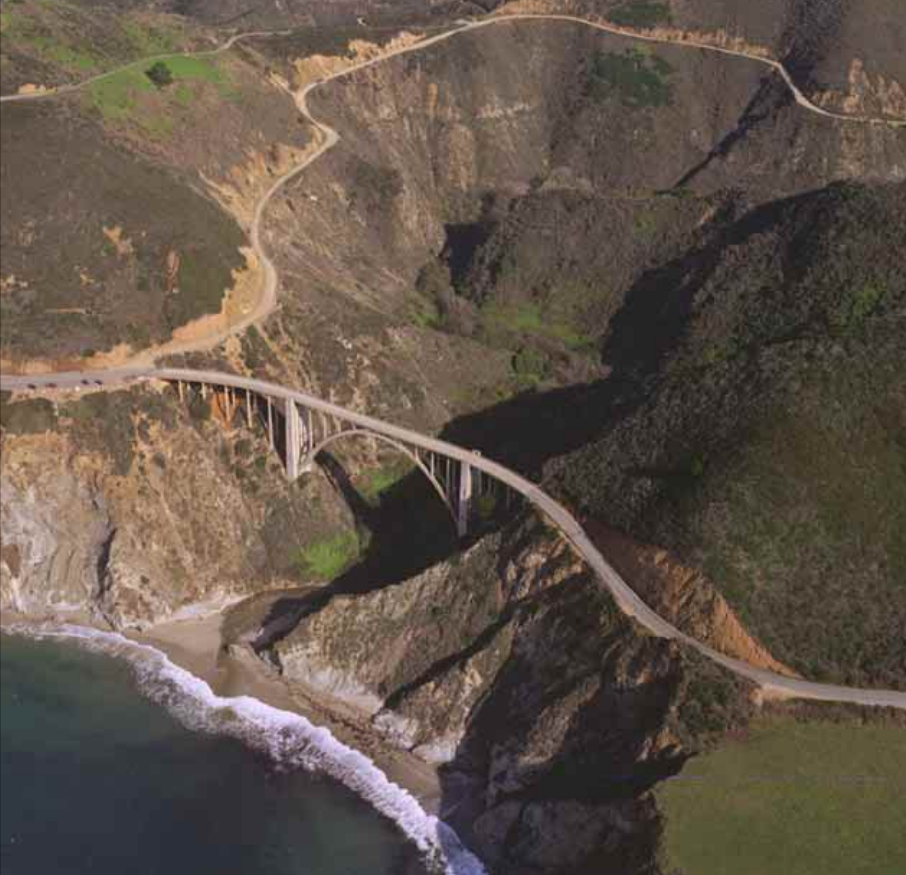
An aerial view of the Bixby Bridge showing the curved approaches at both ends

Over 300 thousand board feet (710 m^{3}) of Douglas fir timber, used to build a 250-foot (76 m) high falsework to support the arch during construction, was transported from the railroad terminal in Monterey over the narrow, one-way road to the bridge site. The falsework, built by crews led by E. C. Panton, the general superintendent, and I. O. Jahlstrom, resident engineer of Ward Engineering Co., was difficult to raise, because it was constantly exposed to high winds. Some of the falsework timbers were 10 by 10 inches (250 mm × 250 mm). It took two months to construct the falsework alone. When high waves threatened the falsework foundation, construction was halted for a short time until winter storms abated.

The crews excavated 4,700 cubic yards (3,600 m^{3}) of earth and rock. Eight hundred and twenty-five trucks brought in 600,000 pounds of reinforcing steel. Sand and gravel were supplied from a plant in Big Sur.

Construction required 45,000 sacks or 6,600 cubic yards (5,000 m^{3}) of cement which was transported from Davenport, near Santa Cruz, and from San Andreas. Crews began placing concrete on November 27. The concrete was transported across the canyon on platforms using slings suspended from a cable 300 feet (91 m) above the creek.

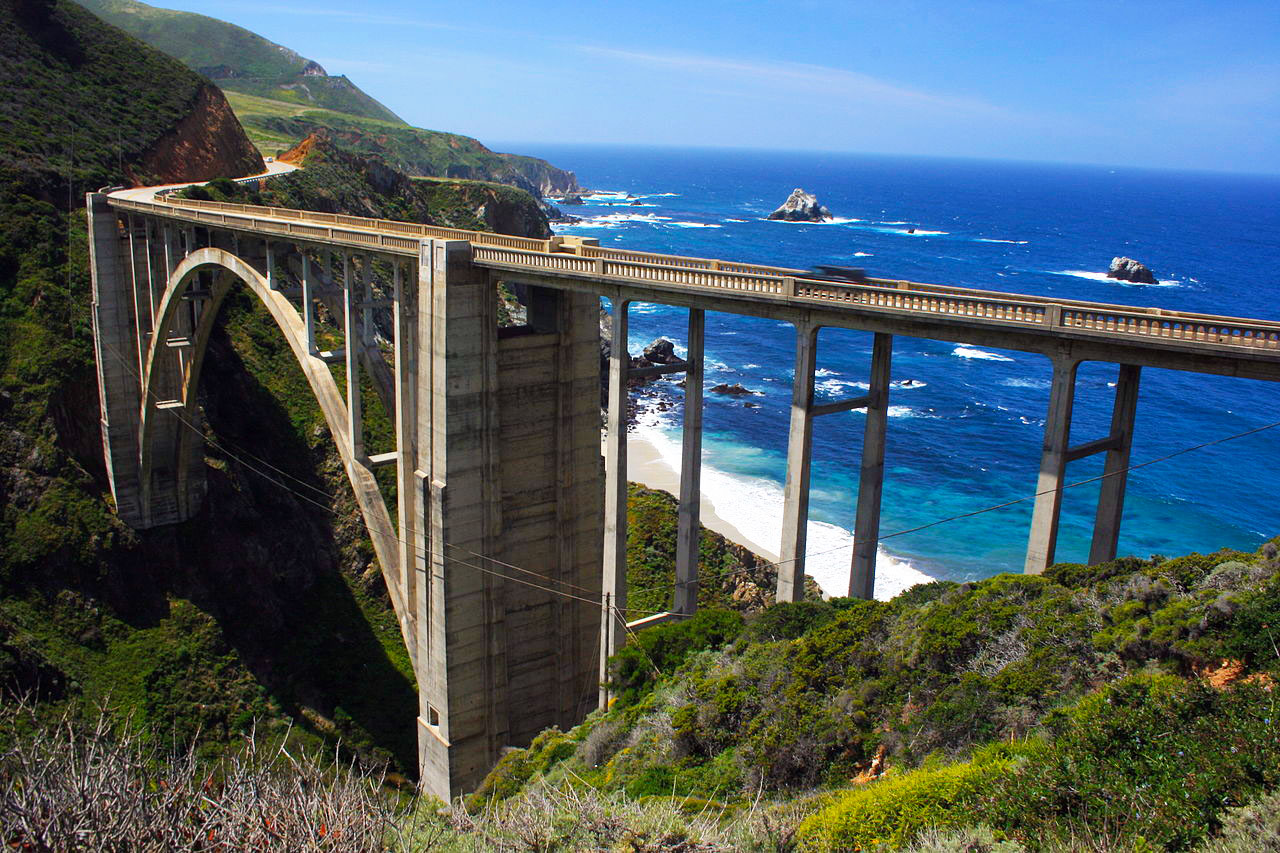
Bixby Bridge from the northeast

The bridge was completed on October 15, 1932, although the highway was not finished for another five years. At its completion, the bridge cost $199,861 and, at 360 feet (110 m), was the longest concrete arch span on the California State Highway System. The bridge was necessary to complete the two-lane road which opened in 1937 after 18 years of construction. The completion of construction was celebrated with a ribbon-cutting ceremony led by Dr. John L.D. Roberts, who had conceived of the need for the road.

=== Rainbow Bridge ===
After the bridge was completed, it was at times known as the Rainbow Bridge, due to the presence of the Rainbow Lodge resort on the creek upstream from the bridge. It was operated by former Army Captain Howard Sharpe and his wife, Frida. After timber harvesting was no longer profitable, Sharpe bought the Bixby Creek Canyon ranch in 1919. He built a dirt road from the lodge up the canyon to Bixby Landing on the point northwest of the canyon mouth, and another road down to the beach at the mouth of Bixby Creek. He sold part of his land to the state as part of the bridge right-of-way in 1930. When the bridge was completed and tourists no longer needed to descend to his lodge on the creek, he built a new lodge on the highway north of the bridge.

=== Seismic retrofitting ===
The bridge was retrofitted beginning in 1996 with an analysis by bridge engineering company Buckland & Taylor as part of the Caltrans Phase II seismic retrofit program. In their detailed evaluation of the bridge's seismic vulnerabilities, they were challenged to find a solution that met several difficult issues, including severe load factors, extremely limited physical access, maintaining the appearance of the existing historical structure, and a requirement by the State of California that at least one lane of the bridge remain open at all times. The crux of the design was the longitudinal post-tensioning of the entire bridge deck from end to end.

The $20 million seismic retrofit began in May 1998. The cost of the retrofit was considerably increased by the requirement to preserve the historical look of the bridge. Prime contractor Vahani Construction of San Francisco was assisted by Faye Bernstein & Associates and Waldron Engineering. To reinforce the abutments supporting the bridge deck at either end, engineers put in place a floating slab, continuous with the deck, keyed into a massive pile cap with six 72-inch (1,800 mm) diameter cast-in-drilled-hole (CIDH) piles behind each abutment. To support the towers, engineers designed a full height structural wall that was integrated within each of the two existing towers. During the retrofit, they removed the top portion of the towers, including the roadway, and replaced them with a prestressed diaphragm that anchors the full height of the vertical tower. The diaphragm simultaneously distributes the vertical prestressing forces uniformly to the new concrete structural wall and the existing tower's concrete.

The deck, which curves from one end to the other, was reinforced by adding heavily confined edge beams encasing high strength steel along the inside face of the exterior longitudinal girders underneath. These rods extended from one end of the roadway to the other. The reinforced edge beams ensure continuity across the many expansion joints and help distribute the bending strains due to lateral flexure. In addition to the reinforced edge beam, four large prestressing tendons were installed the length of the bridge along the underside of the deck slab. These tendons are stressed to pre-compress the concrete deck to approximately 800 psi and also serve as flexural reinforcement along with the high strength rods. Finally, engineers found a way to reinforce the bent columns attached to the arch, which possess complex and varying geometric challenges. They encased the bent columns with thin, lightweight, composite carbon fiber jackets that provide the necessary degree of confinement to ensure ductile response and also mimic the original design.

In addition to the analyses performed by Buckland and Taylor, Caltrans commissioned Lawrence Livermore National Laboratory to perform an independent study of the structure both with and without the proposed retrofit measures in place. The final report, which was published in June 1999, concludes that the retrofit appears to be appropriate even for earthquake ground motions including near-field displacement pulses, which were not considered in the original analyses.

As a result of the retrofit, the continuous, stiffened deck has four lateral reaction points: two new massive abutments anchored by large-diameter, cast-in-drilled-hole piles. The two towers are strengthened and anchored to rock with tie-down anchors within the towers. The arch ribs are laterally supported at their crowns by new shear keys that link them to the reinforced deck. The expensive retrofit, completed in November 2000, still left the bridge officially classified as "functionally obsolete" because at 24 feet (7.3 m) in width, the bridge is less than the 32 feet (9.8 m) standard required of newly built bridges.

== History ==
The land near the bridge was historically occupied by the native Esselen people who visited the coast seasonally to harvest shellfish and to fish offshore. When the Spanish established the California mission system, only a very few were not baptized and conscripted, and they soon left the mountains to work on the nearby ranches. Governor Juan Alvarado granted the land from present day Carmel south to Palo Colorado Canyon, two miles north of Bixby Creek, to Marcelino Escobar in 1839 as part of the Rancho San Jose y Sur Chiquito. The land was later acquired by Alvarado's brother-in-law José Castro. Castro noted the existence of a Native American trail from Monterey to Palo Colorado Canyon in 1853, when he filed a map of his grant.

=== Originally Mill Creek ===
Bixby Creek is named after pioneering Yankee businessman Charles Henry Bixby. Originally from Livingston County, New York, he arrived in California in 1852 and remained for five years. He returned east before coming back to California. After some success raising cattle in Sonoma County, he obtained a patent on April 10, 1889 for 160 acres (65 ha) south of Bixby Creek, and later bought additional tracts of land on the north side of the creek, between it and Palo Colorado Canyon.

Bixby built a sawmill with a capacity of twelve thousand feet of lumber per day on the creek, which was then known as Mill Creek. He harvested timber and turned it into shakes, shingles, railroad ties, and trench posts. He also harvested the bark of the tanbark oak, which was used for tanning cow hides. Bixby discovered lime deposits on Long Ridge above Mill Creek. He had kilns built and used mules to haul the lime to the coast on wooden sleds. The creek and canyon were renamed in his honor when the bridge was completed in November 1932.

=== Bixby Landing ===
It was impossible to build a wharf from the cliffs that dropped into the ocean. To transport the tanbark and lime to Monterey and San Francisco, Bixby built a doghole port consisting of a hoist and chute that could be used to ferry goods to and from ships anchored slightly offshore. The powdered lime was packed into barrels that were then attached to cable strung from the coastal cliff. The cargo was hoisted in slings from the landing along a cable winched about 50 yards out into the Pacific Ocean, where it was loaded aboard coastal schooners. The schooners were moored to deadeyes embedded in rocks of the adjacent shore. He sold the fired lime for use in cement, mortar, and other building materials.

=== Coast road extended south ===
Bixby tried to persuade the county to build a road to Bixby Creek, but they refused, replying that "no one would want to live there." In 1870, Bixby and his father hired men to improve the track and constructed the first wagon road including 23 bridges from the Carmel Mission to Bixby Creek. Near Malpaso Creek, the creek has very steep side slopes and the crossing was a ford only 10 feet (3.0 m) above sea level until the Malpaso Creek Bridge was built in 1935 as part the Big Sur Coast Highway.

Sometime later Bixby partnered with William B. Post and extended what became known as the Old Coast Road south to his ranch. At Bixby Creek, the road was necessarily built 11 miles (18 km) inland to circumvent the deep canyon. It also went inland to circumvent the Little Sur River. It then led to the Post Ranch on the Rancho El Sur near present-day Andrew Molera State Park. The 30-mile (48 km) trip from Carmel could take three days by wagon or stagecoach. The single-lane road was closed in winter when it became impassable. Coast residents received supplies via a schooner from Monterey and San Francisco that off-loaded supplies that could not be transported overland near Big Sur once a year.

=== Sold to lime company ===
In 1906, after he exhausted the supply of commercial timber, Bixby sold the land to the Monterey Lime Company. Lime was in great demand to help re-build San Francisco following the 1906 earthquake. The company built lime kilns 3 miles (4.8 km) up Bixby Canyon from the coast and mined the high grade limestone located in the area. To feed the limekiln fires, they cut much of the old growth redwood in the canyon. They built a 3 miles (4.8 km) aerial tram to haul the barrels of limestone from Long Ridge to Bixby Landing. A small group of homes grew up around the original Bixby Homestead. The kilns operated for four years until 1911 when a log jam during winter rains caused a flood in the canyon. The tram was used for a while longer to off and on-load supplies for the community from schooners.

== Lumber harvesting proposed ==
In 1986 a portion of the land formerly owned by Bixby was held by Humboldt County-based Philo Lumber Company. They obtained a state permit to log over a million board feet of redwood. The residents of Palo Colorado Canyon were intensely opposed to the plan, but it was only derailed by the savings and loan crisis. The property was seized by federal financial regulators and was later sold to the Big Sur Land Trust for $1.2 million dollars in September 1987. The Trust agreed to hold the land for the Monterey Peninsula Regional Park District until the district could secure funding through Proposition 70 or other means. The Trust's purchase was made possible only through a "bridge" loan made by the David and Lucile Packard Foundation. Big Sur Trust board member Nancy Hopkins was a daughter-in-law of Hewlett Packard founder David Packard and was the trust's first president. The Trust sold the land to the Monterey Peninsula Regional Park District in 1988. The district joined it with three adjacent properties to form the Mill Creek Redwood Preserve.

=== Adler Ranch sale ===
In the 20th century, Axel Adler built a cabin on the former Bixby Ranch and gradually acquired more land. In 2013, the family put a 1,199 acres (485 ha) portion of the 1,312 acres (531 ha) Adler Ranch on the market for $15 million. The land is located at the end and south of Palo Colorado Road. It is adjacent to Los Padres National Forest, Mill Creek Redwoods Preserve, and includes the peak of Bixby Mountain and the upper portions of Mescal Ridge. The El Sur Ranch and Mount Pico Blanco are to the south. The property was especially valuable because it included nine legal parcels, five of which could be built on. The Big Sur Land Trust stated it was not interested in acquiring the property.

The nonprofit Western Rivers Conservancy, which buys land with the goal to protect habitat and provide public access, secured a purchase agreement. It was interested in selling the land to the US Forest Service, which would make it possible for hikers to travel from Bottcher's Gap to the sea. But some local residents were opposed to the forest service acquiring the land. They were concerned about a lack of federal funding to maintain a critical fire break on the land.

On October 2, 2019, the California Natural Resources Agency announced it was seeking funding through Proposition 68, a bond measure approved by voters in 2018, to obtain the land for the Esselen tribe. The Adler family agreed to sell 1,199 acres (485 ha) of the Adler Ranch. In late July 2020 the purchase of the Adler Ranch successfully closed. The land was purchased through a $4.52 million grant from the California Natural Resources Agency and the property was transferred to the Esselen tribe. The land acquisition could help facilitate federal recognition of the tribe.

=== Early resorts ===
Bixby Landing in 1911—known then as Hamilton's Landing on Mill Creek—was used to transport supplies and products to and from ships off shore.

A post office was established near the sawmill in the early 1880s and was then moved west to the mouth of the canyon. Thomas Fussell bought the land and then sold it to Horace Hogues. In 1919, Captain Howard G. and Frida Sharpe bought the Bixby Creek canyon property. Remnants of its prior use included an old ranch house, barn, corral, dance hall, stable, numerous out-buildings, and several cabins that they rented to visitors. Sharpe built a dirt road from the lodge up the canyon to Bixby Landing and another road down to the beach at the mouth of Bixby Creek.

When the bridge was completed, the lodge on Bixby Creek was no longer on the route used by tourists. In 1931 Sharpe built a new stone Rainbow Lodge on the western shoulder of the highway immediately north of the bridge. The former lodge in the canyon bottom was abandoned. In 1938, Sharpe re-discovered a colony of California sea otters, thought to be extinct. More tourists came to see the sea otters and Sharpe added cabins and renamed it the Bixby Inn. A fire in 1941 burned what was left of the ranch on the canyon floor, and the Sharpes subdivided the property and sold parcels.

The restaurant was closed at the beginning of World War II, when gas conservation regulations severely restricted non-essential travel. It was later sold to Gallatin Powers, who renamed it Gallatins, and later the Crocodile's Tail. Years later, the site was found to be geologically unsafe and in November 1953 the building was bulldozed over the cliff.

=== Brazil Ranch ===
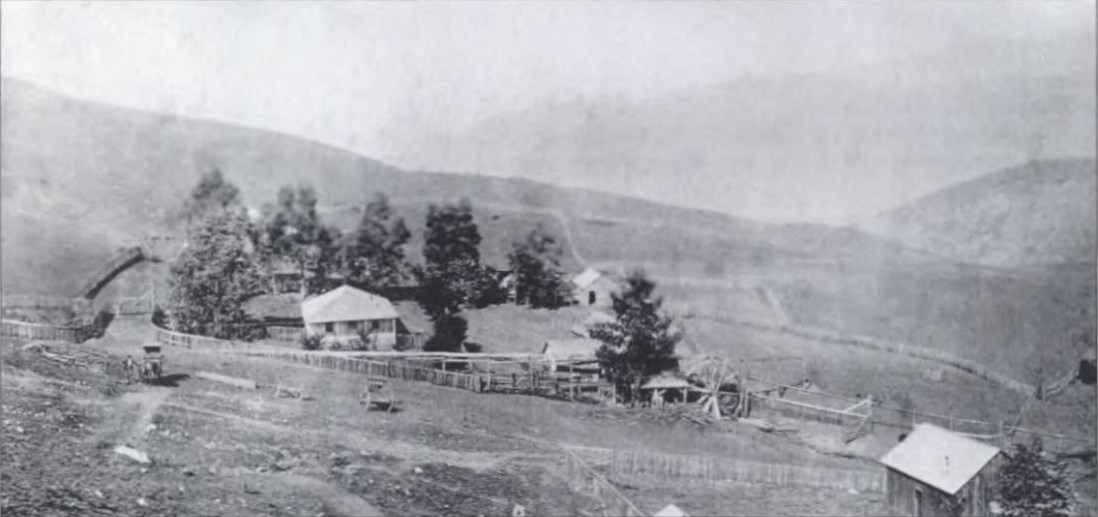
The Brazil Ranch on Serra Hill south of Bixby Creek on the Big Sur coast circa 1880s or 1890s

The former Brazil Ranch (also known as the Bixby Ocean Branch) is located on Serra Hill immediately south of Bixby Creek and the Bixby Creek Bridge, making it one of the most photographed spots on the Big Sur coast. Job Heath obtained a land patent on May 20, 1884 and he and his wife Serena Waters homesteaded the ranch. Antonio Brazil married Mary Pfeiffer and they bought Heath's property. The hill is not named for Junipero Serra, but is a corruption of the Spanish word, cerro, meaning "high hill."

Acquired by Allen Funt

The Brazil family operated the 1,255 acres (508 ha) ranch for nearly a century. In 1977, Tony and Margaret Brazil sold the ranch to Allen Funt, creator of the television show Candid Camera. Funt raised quarter horses and cattle on it. He built a cabin and barn on the site and improved it for use as a ranch. After Funt had a stroke in 1993, he tried to interest environmental groups in buying the land without success.

Subdivided by developer

After Funt died in 1999, land speculator Brian Sweeney and two partners, acting as Woodside Partners, a Las Vegas-based company, began nine months of negotiations to buy the property. Sweeney's lawyer unearthed long-forgotten records showing that the property was originally composed of nine land patents. He and his partners persuaded county officials to keep mum and bought the land for $9.2 million. As permitted by law, he obtained county permission to subdivide the land into nine parcels, vastly increasing its value. He soon sold Funt's house and the parcel it stood on for $7.2 million.

Purchased by trust

Sweeney's actions stunned local community leaders and activists, who joined together to prevent him and his partners from subdividing and developing the land. Less than a year later, the Trust for Public Land bought the property for more than $26.25 million, almost tripling what the partners paid. On September 24, 2002, they and the U.S. Forest Service announced that the land had been added to the Los Padres National Forest. While criticized by some for the huge profit they took in selling the property to the trust, a local real estate agent said if Sweeney and his partners had sold the land to private parties, they could have earned as much as $50 million.

Public access

The public can enter the USFS land using an unmarked gate to a little-used dirt road on the east side of Highway 1, 0.1 miles (0.16 km) south of the Bixby Bridge. There is no parking lot. Visitors can hike up a steep trail to the ridge overlooking the coast.

=== Trail and road access ===
To allow access to the Mill Creek Redwood Preserve, a 2.7 miles (4.3 km) trail was built by hand over ten years from Palo Colorado Road to an overlook. The trail was closed in 2016 due to destruction from the Soberanes fire. As of June 2020, the Palo Colorado Road is closed due to washouts caused by rains after the Soberanes Fire in 2017. To limit traffic on narrow Palo Colorado Road, access is limited to day use and only six permits per day are available. Visitors must obtain a permit in advance from the Monterey Peninsula Regional Park District to visit the preserve. The trail head is located 6 miles (9.7 km) inland on Palo Colorado Road. The Old Coast Road that the bridge replaced remains open to vehicles, weather permitting. The Old Coast Road from the north side of Bixby Creek is 11 miles (18 km) long, cutting inland across the Little Sur River, and ends near the northern border of Andrew Molera State Park, 8.3 miles (13.4 km) to the south along Highway 1.

=== Scenic designation ===
The bridge contributes to the scenic attraction of driving Highway 1. The 72 miles (116 km) section of the highway from Cambria to Carmel Highlands was the first in the state to be designated as a Scenic Highway in 1965. In 1966 First Lady Lady Bird Johnson led the official scenic road designation ceremony at Bixby Bridge.

== Overuse issues ==
The bridge was already popular before the introduction of smart phones and social media, and visitors to the Bixby Bridge and other Big Sur attractions have dramatically increased since then. Due to the large number of visitors, congestion and slow traffic between Carmel and the bridge is frequently the norm during popular holiday and vacation periods. The bridge was rated as the No. 1 “Instagram-Worthy Destination for 2019 Travels” by the website Travelpulse.com. The California state tourism commission describes the bridge as "a must-see road trip spot for many and probably the most Instagrammed features [sic] along [the] Highway 1 coastline." It promotes the bridge world-wide, including a deal with China's online tourism operator Tuniu that put the bridge on a custom route.

During holiday weekends and most summer vacation periods, the bridge area is "like a Safeway parking lot" according to a local resident. Traffic can come to a standstill as motorists wait for a parking spot. There is a pull out to the north and west side of Highway 1, but when it is full, visitors sometimes fail to completely pull off the highway, leaving inadequate space for passing vehicles.

The area near the bridge has become overwhelmed by visitors. Tourists routinely ignore warning signs to stay off the cliffs, and walk across the narrow 24 feet (7.3 m) wide bridge, although there is no room for pedestrians. There are no toilets within several miles of the bridge, and visitors resort to defecating in nearby bushes. Residents complain about toilet paper, human waste, and trash littering the roadside. On December 29, 2018, two dozen residents and business leaders turned out with signs alongside the northern approach to the bridge to launch a campaign they named The Big Sur Pledge, encouraging visitors to treat the region with more respect.

Starting on September 13, 2024, parking at the entrance of Old Coast Road on the northern end of the bridge is prohibited, due to parked cars blocking the road.

== Gallery ==
Bixby Bridge

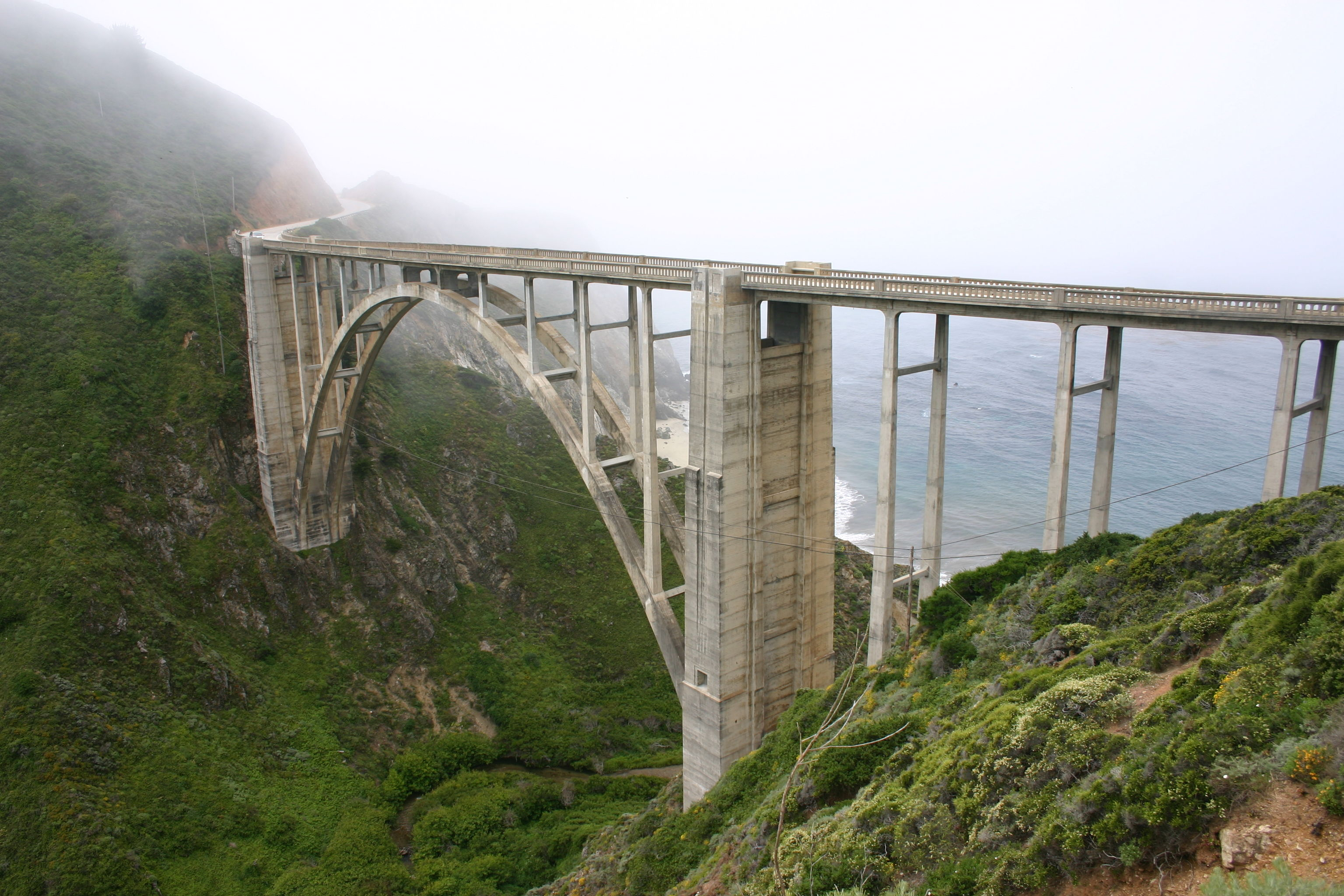
Viewed from the Old Coast Road

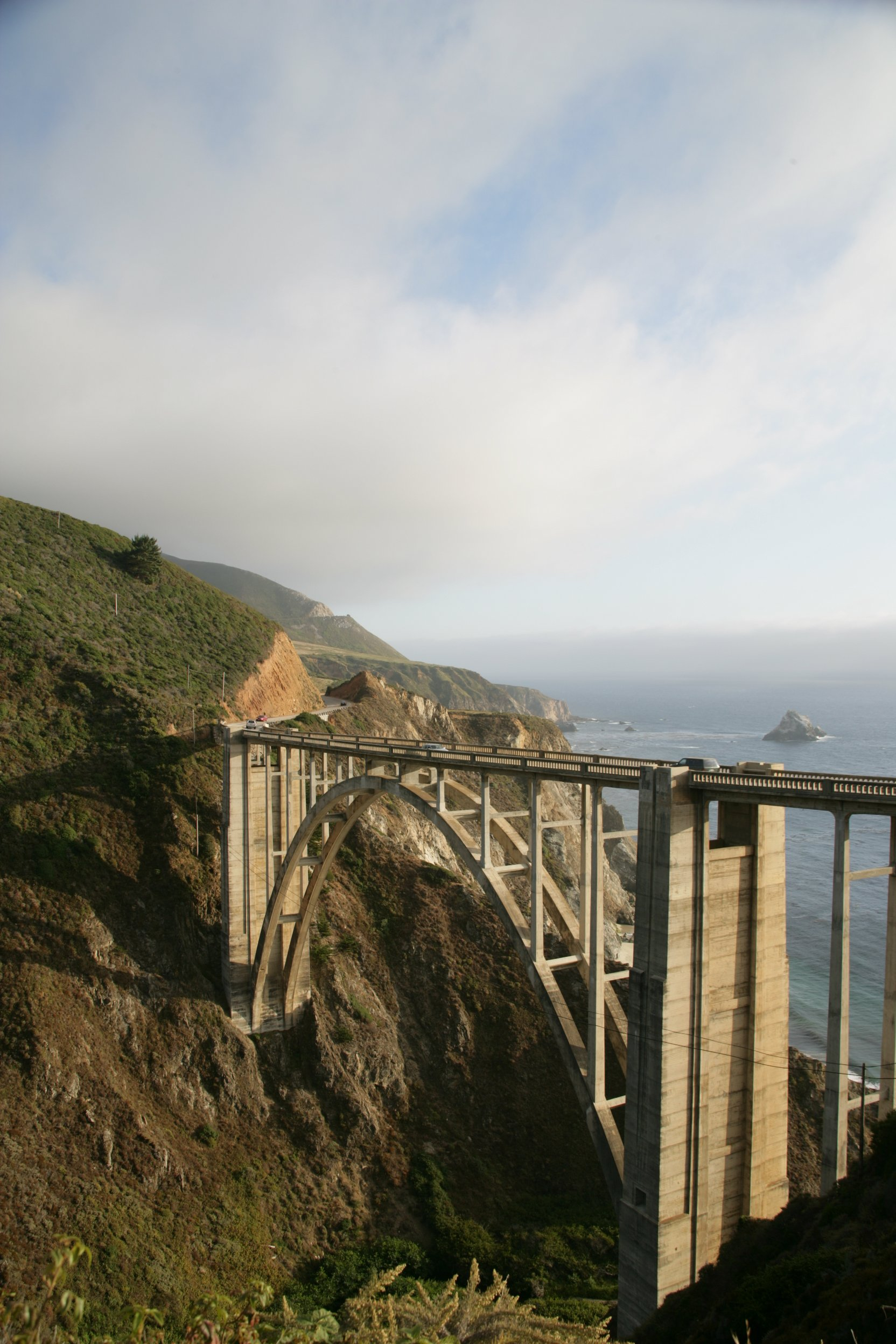
Afternoon view

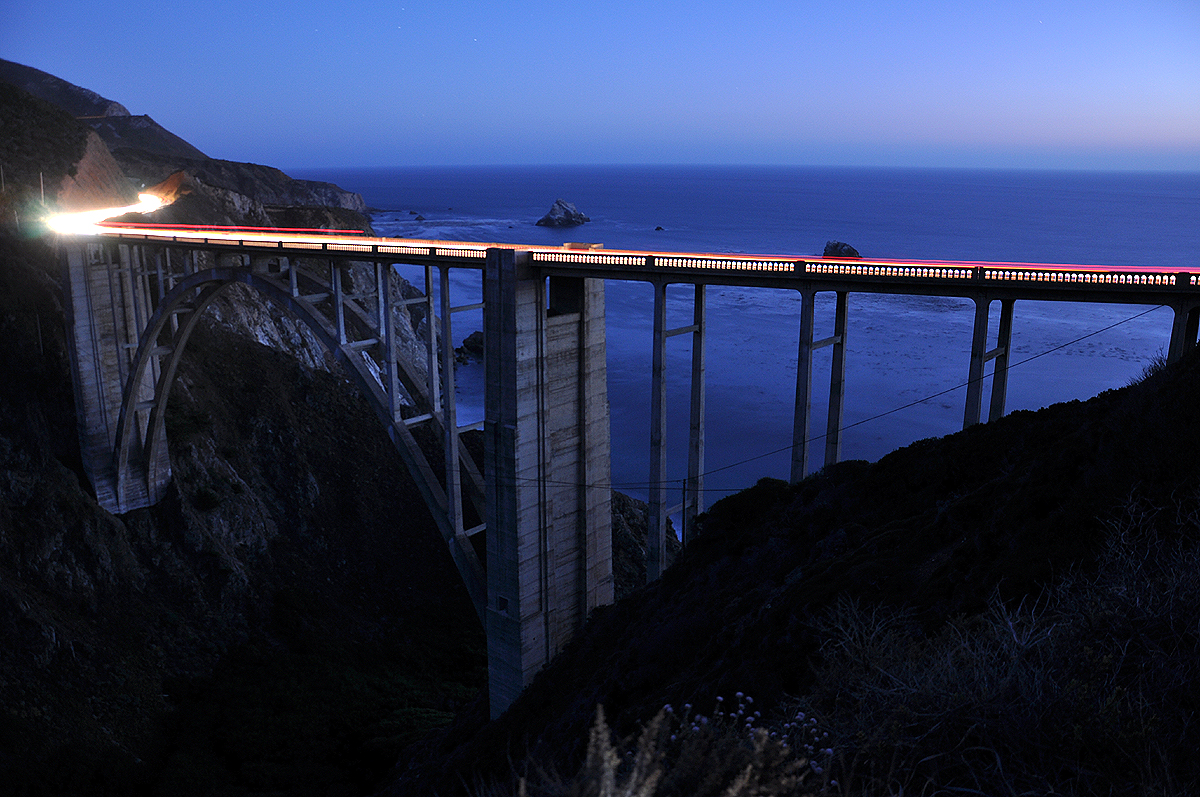
Sunset view

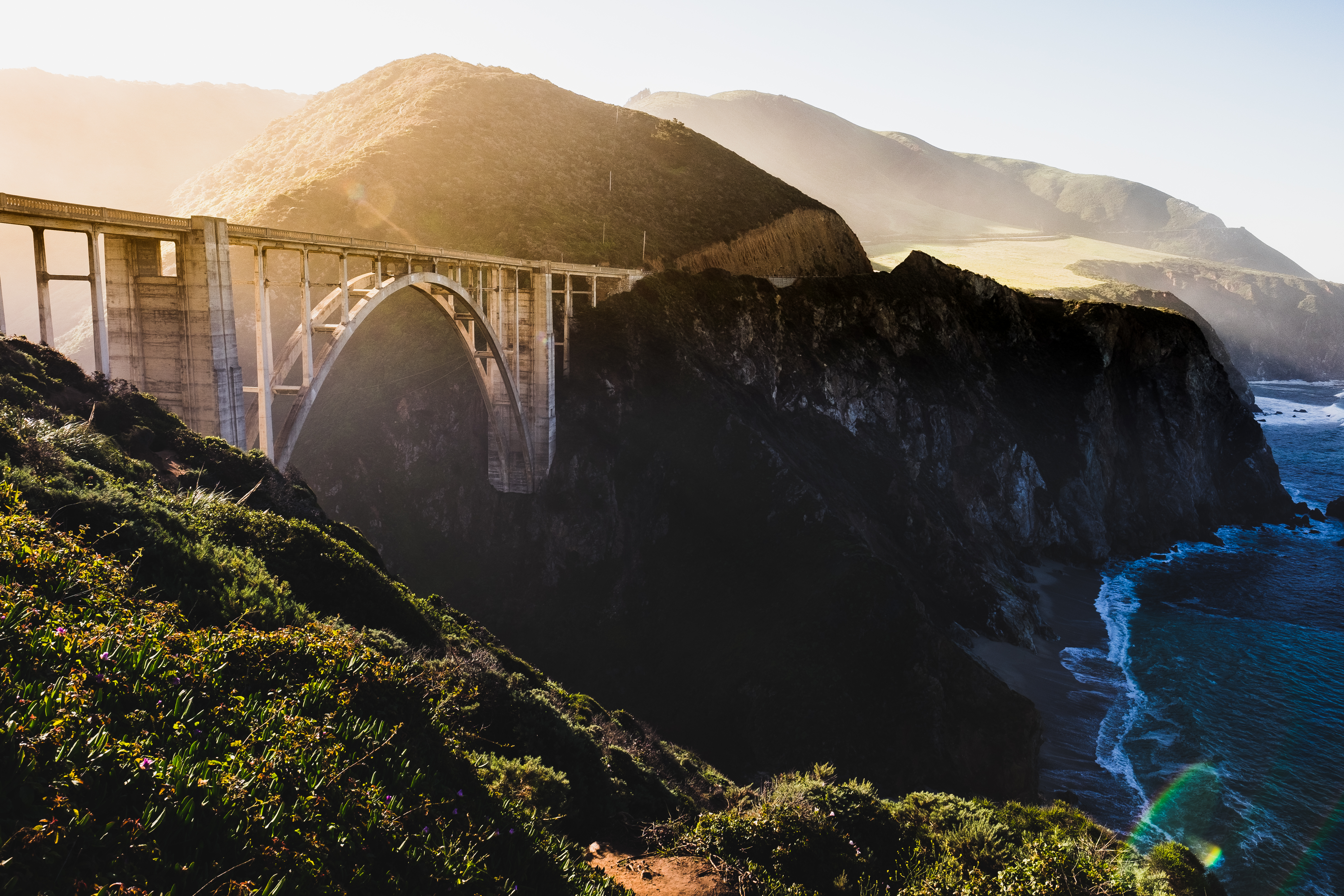
Early morning

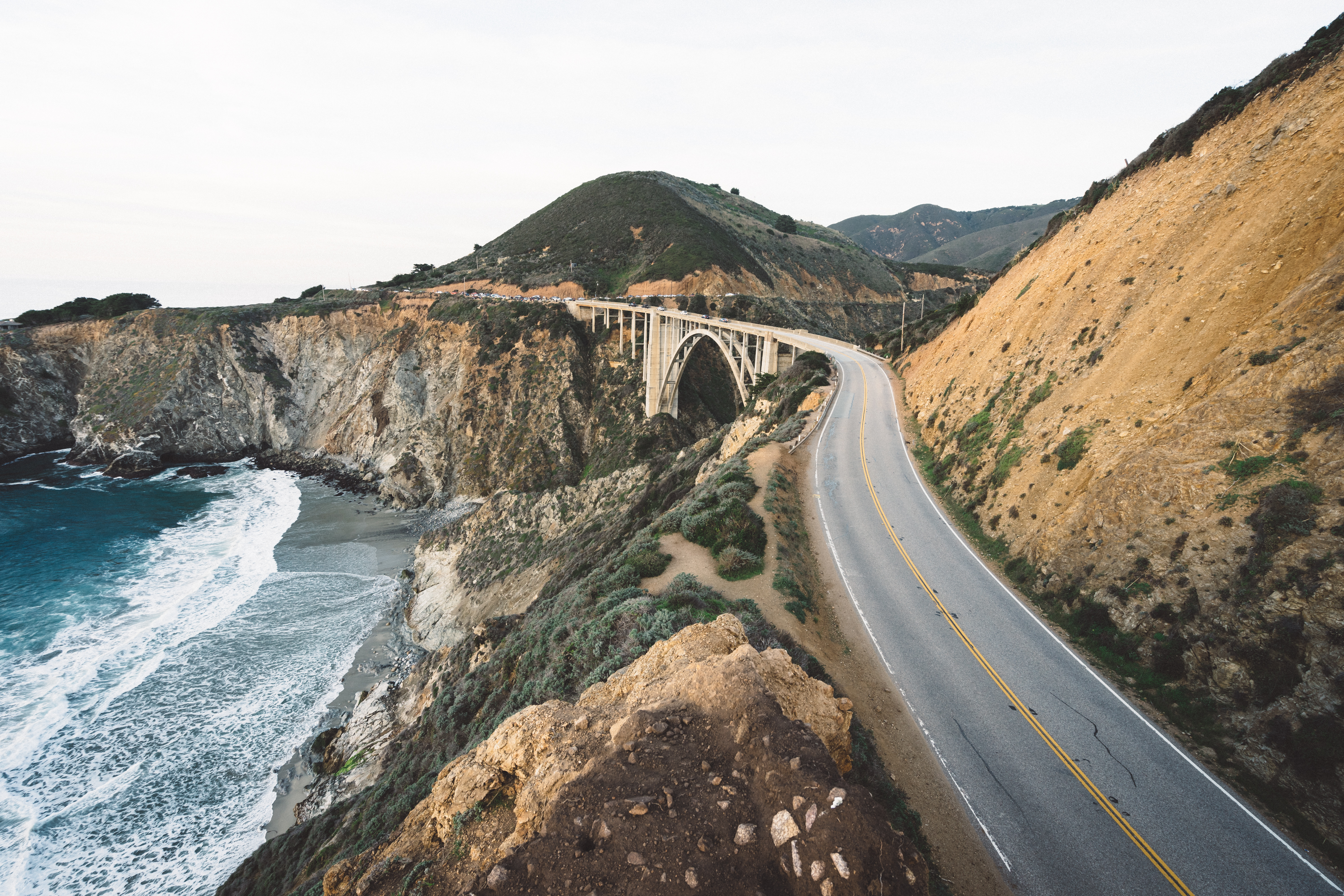
Southern view

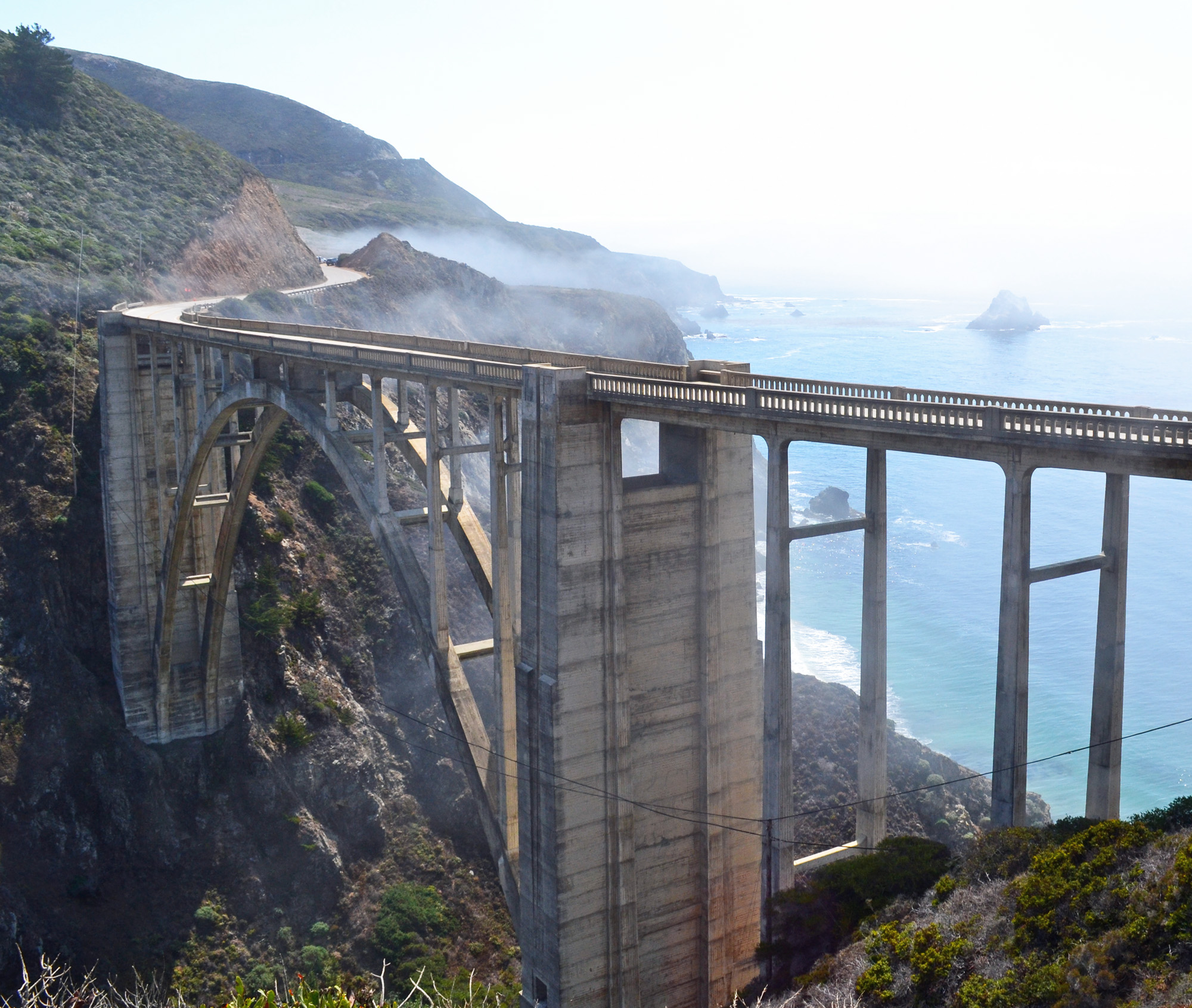
The northern tower

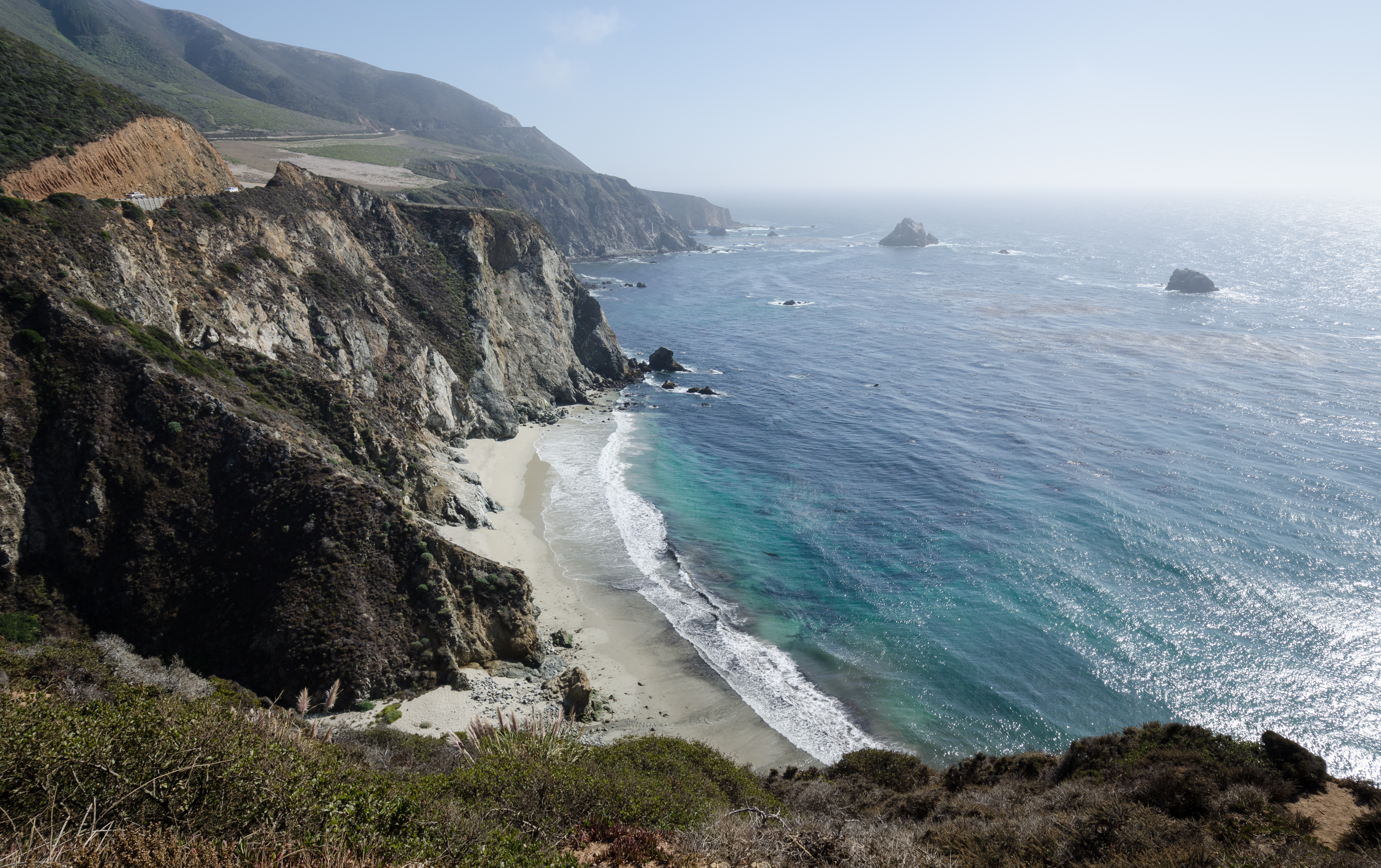
Coastal view

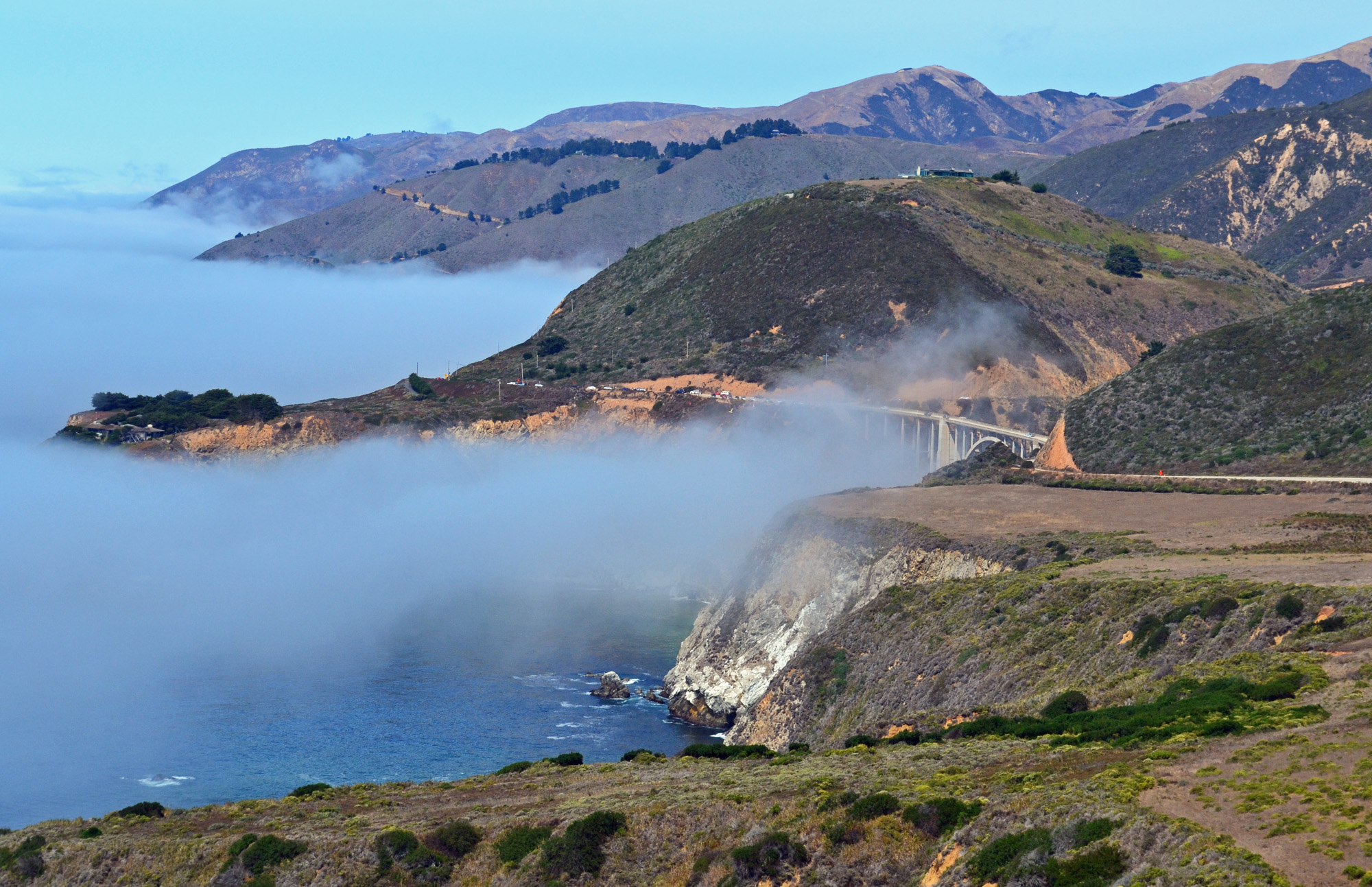
Morning fog

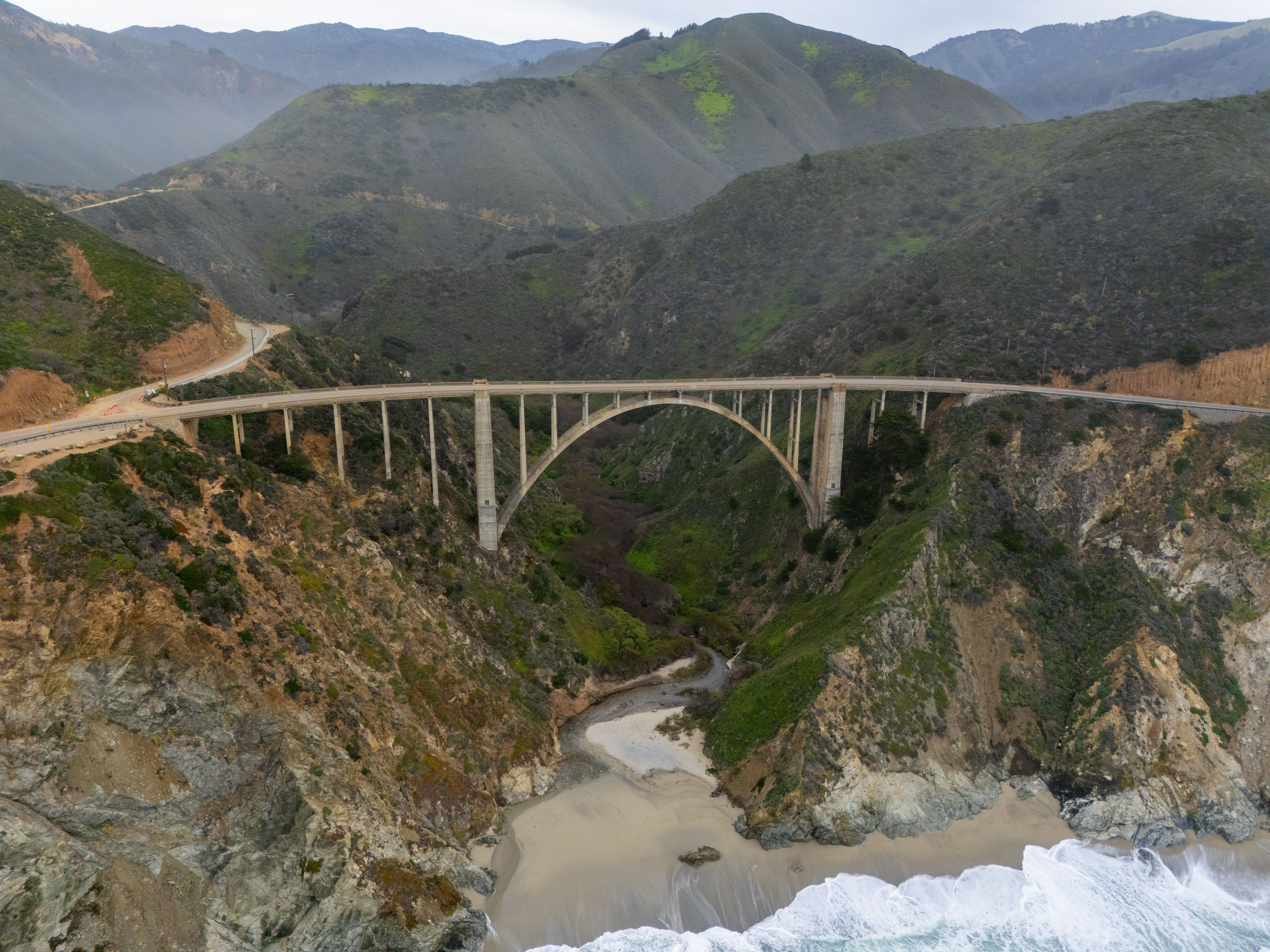
Drone shot

== In popular media ==
=== Express mail stamp ===
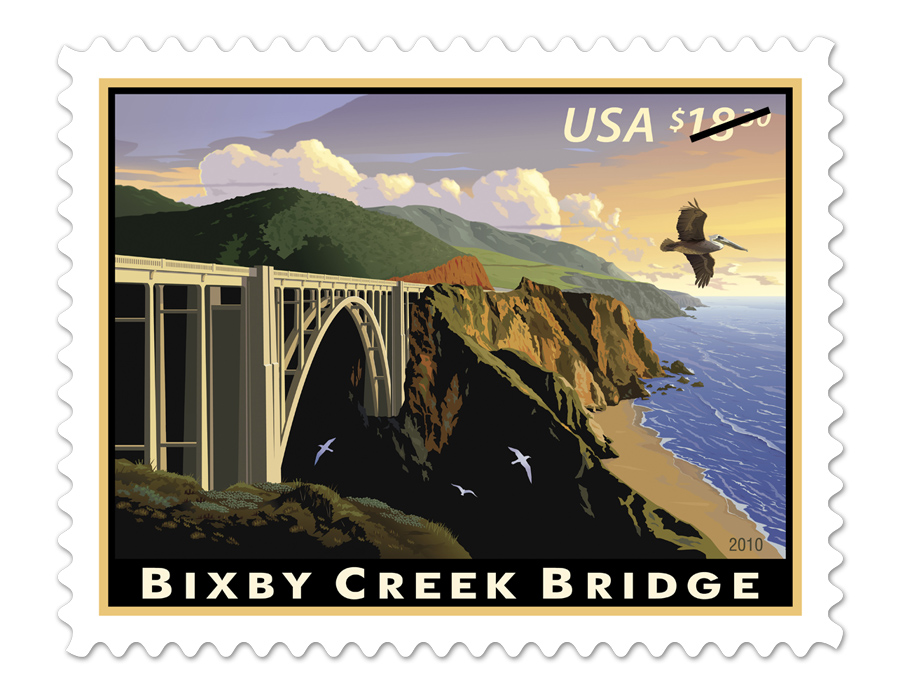
Express mail stamp

The bridge was commemorated in an express mail stamp issued on February 3, 2010. The United States Postal Service introduced an $18.30 definitive stamp designed by Carl T. Herrman of North Las Vegas, Nevada. The stamp features a color digital illustration of Bixby Bridge by Dan Cosgrove of Clarendon Hills, Illinois.

=== MacOS Big Sur ===
The Bixby Bridge features prominently in the main icon for Apple's Big Sur operating system. It also appears in the "Big Sur Day," "Big Sur Night," and "Big Sur Aerial" built-in desktop pictures.

=== Film, television, and video games ===
The bridge was featured in the opening scene of the 1969–70 television titles Then Came Bronson, in the films Play Misty for Me, Escape To Witch Mountain and The Sandpiper, and in numerous auto commercials. The bridge is also featured in the video game Grand Theft Auto V. The bridge was featured in the 2017 television series Big Little Lies as well as the 2022 film Top Gun: Maverick.

=== Music ===
The American alternative rock band Death Cab for Cutie’s 2008 album Narrow Stairs opens with the song “Bixby Canyon Bridge”, written by the band’s founder Ben Gibbard.

=== BASE jumping ===
Individuals have been known to BASE jump off the bridge. Monterey County Sheriff Steve Bernal told the media that while it is technically legal to jump off the bridge, jumpers land on private property, constituting trespassing. It is also easy to commit traffic violations while on the bridge.

Steven Jester, who lived in Aptos at the time, jumped off the bridge in 2010 in defiance of a Highway Patrol officer who attempted to stop him. Someone assisting him recorded the confrontation with the officer and his jump. It got over two million views on YouTube. Jester was found guilty of threatening violence against a peace officer, driving under the influence of alcohol, possession of marijuana and disobeying a peace officer order. He could have been sentenced to three years in jail, but the judge gave him probation and required him to enter an alcohol rehab program.

On January 20, 2016, two BASE jumpers died when they landed near the surf and were overwhelmed by waves. Officials only determined that the two were missing on January 23 after their rental car was found abandoned near the bridge. Searchers found only the man's parachute, helmet, and video camera on the shore beneath the bridge. Video recovered from the helmet camera revealed how they died. Mary Catherine Connell landed safely on the small beach but was overwhelmed in succession by three waves. BASE jumping instructor Rami Kajala saw her overtaken by the waves and unsuccessfully attempted to rescue her. Kajala was known as one of the world's leaders in BASE jumping and instructed individuals around the world. Kajala's body was found more than two weeks later. Connell's body was never recovered.

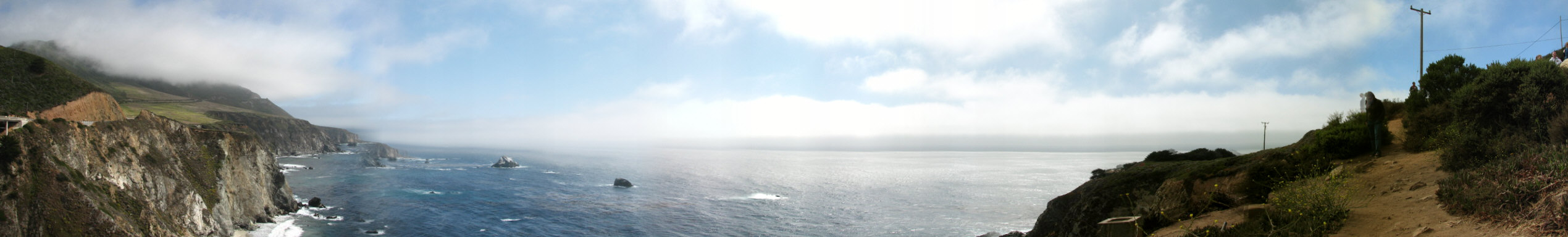
View of the Pacific Ocean from the Bixby Bridge

== See also ==
- List of bridges in the United States by height
- Rocky Creek Bridge
