= Bixby Creek (California) =

- Location of the mouth of Bixby Creek in California

Location
- Country: United States

Physical characteristics
- Source
  - location: Confluence of Turner Creek and Mill Creek
  - coordinates: 36°22′17″N 121°50′37″W
  - elevation: 975 ft
- Mouth
  - location: Pacific Ocean
  - coordinates: 36°22′17″N 121°54′11″W

Bixby Creek is a west flowing stream in Monterey County the U.S. state of California. The stream is crossed by the Bixby Creek Bridge of California State Route 1 prior to entering the Pacific Ocean.

== See also ==
- List of rivers of California
