= Chesebro =

Chesebro is a surname. Notable people with the surname include:

- Caroline Chesebro' (1825–1873), American writer
- George Chesebro (1888–1959), American actor
- James Chesebro (1944–2020), American academic
- Kenneth Chesebro (born 1961), American attorney
- Ray L. Chesebro (1880–1954), American judge and attorney

== See also ==
- Chesebro Smith House, North Dakota, US
- Chesebrough (disambiguation)
- Cheseborough (disambiguation)
- Cheesebrough (disambiguation)
- Cheeseborough (disambiguation)
