= Chesebrough =

Chesebrough may refer to:

- Robert Chesebrough (1837–1933), an American chemist
  - Chesebrough Manufacturing Company, American oil business which produced petroleum jelly or vaseline
- Chesebrough Scout Reservation, also called Camp Chesebrough
- Edith Chesebrough Van Antwerp (1881–1949), American golfer

== See also ==
- Cheeseborough (disambiguation)
- Cheesebrough (disambiguation)
- Cheseborough (disambiguation)
- Chesebro
