= Palo Colorado Canyon, California =

Unincorporated community in California, United States

Palo Colorado Canyon
- Unincorporated community
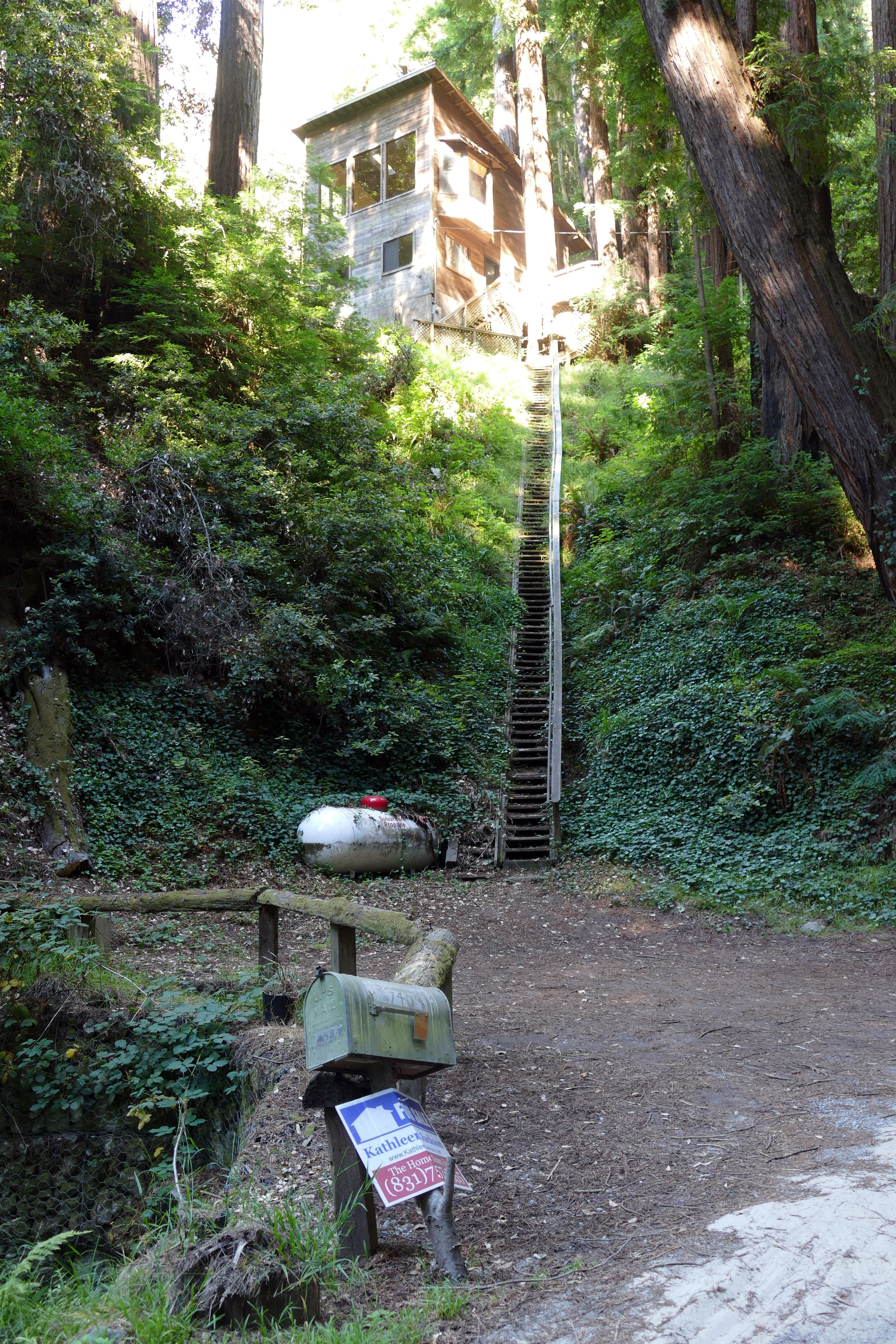
- Home on Palo Colorado Road

- Location in California Palo Colorado Canyon (the United States)
- Coordinates: 36°23′58″N 121°53′17.5″W
- Country: United States
- State: California
- County: Monterey
- Established: 1888
- Elevation: 112 ft (34 m)

Palo Colorado Canyon is an unincorporated community in the Big Sur region of Monterey County, California, United States. The canyon entrance is located 11.3 miles (18.2 km) south of the Carmel River at the former settlement of Notley's Landing, 6.5 miles (10 km) north of Point Sur, and at an elevation of 112 feet (34 m).

== Etymology ==
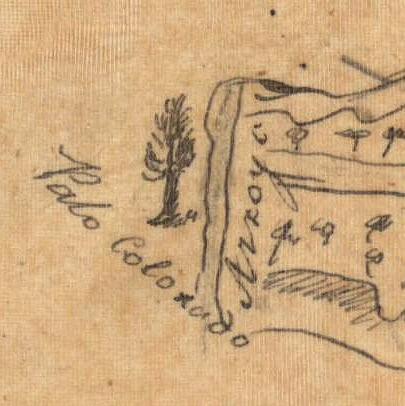
Detail from larger map, Diseño del Rancho San José y Sur Chiquito: Calif., circa 1835, showing the name "Arroyo de Palo Colorado".

Arroyo de Palo Colorado was first named on a diseño, a hand-drawn descriptive map of Rancho San Jose y Sur Chiquito, that was submitted by José Castro to the Land Claims Commission in 1853 to prove his title to the rancho.

== Palo Colorado Road ==
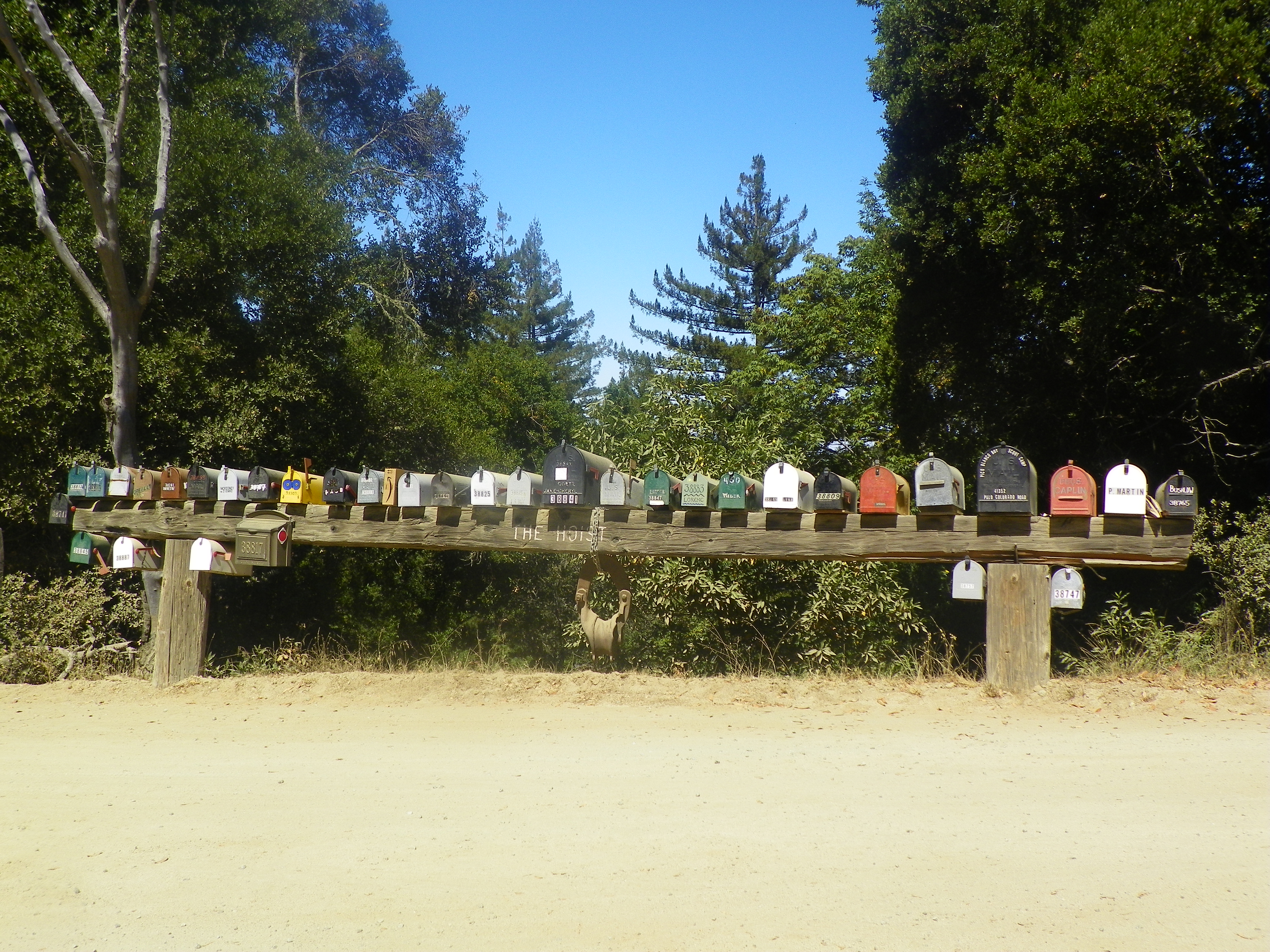
A large pulley hangs from a beam supporting a row of mailboxes on Palo Colorado Canyon Road.

The entrance to the Palo Colorado Road is at the former settlement at Notley's Landing and its intersection with the Big Sur Coast Highway. The first 3 miles (4.8 km) of road winds through a Redwood tree-lined canyon alongside Palo Colorado Creek. It then climbs sharply up the Murray Grade to the top of Green Ridge and the Mid Coast Fire Brigade fire station and into the Rocky Creek watershed. It then climbs again up Long Ridge to a point known locally as The Hoist and into the Bixby Creek watershed. The name for "The Hoist" came about because during the turn of the century sleds (nicknamed "Go-Devils") or wagon-loads of tanbark and lumber were lowered by block and tackle down the steep Murray Grade portion of the road. The old pulley is still chained to a long wooden beam labeled "The Hoist" that supports mailboxes. The road ended at this point until 1950, when the US Army Corps of Engineers began a construction project to extend the road to the North fork of the Little Sur River and future site of Camp Pico Blanco.

The road connects to several private roads to the north. Garrapatos Road connects to the Big Sur Land Trust's Glen Deven Ranch. From the top of Murray Grade, an unpaved road follows Green Ridge and at "The Hoist", another follows Long Ridge. Both are used to access private residences and as fire emergency routes.

When fully open, the road ends after 7.4 miles (11.9 km) at Bottchers Gap, at 2,050 feet (620 m) altitude, the site of former homesteader John Bottcher's cabin in 1885–90. It is currently a primitive campsite and trail head into the Ventana Wilderness and the Los Padres National Forest. A locked gate provides access to a 3.3 miles (5.3 km) long private unpaved road leading to Camp Pico Blanco.

=== Closure ===
The last five-mile segment of Palo Colorado Road was heavily damaged in January 2017. Heavy rains caused debris to block a culvert under the road and Rocky Creek overflowed Palo Colorado Road at mile marker 3.3. The floods resulted from runoff from lands burnt by the Soberanes Fire. Monterey County installed a temporary bridge at Rocky Creek.

The county repaired the road where it crosses Rocky Creek in 2018, but slipouts farther east on the road remain and the road as of June 2020 remains closed. The rains caused considerable additional damage to the road between The Hoist at milepost 4.0 and Bottcher's Gap at milepost 7.4. In August, 2018, the county installed a security gate at The Hoist to prevent non-residents from proceeding further. Camp Pico Blanco, Mill Creek Redwood Preserve, the Little Sur River trailhead on the Old Coast Road, and the Bottchers Gap campground and trail head are closed. About 60 homes are in the area beyond the closure.

The county estimates the four projects in that area will cost about $11 million. The county does not have sufficient funds to repair the entire road and is applying for federal grants. The cost for all of all repairs along the road from milepost 1.0 to 7.4 at Bottcher's Gap is about $20 million.

== History ==
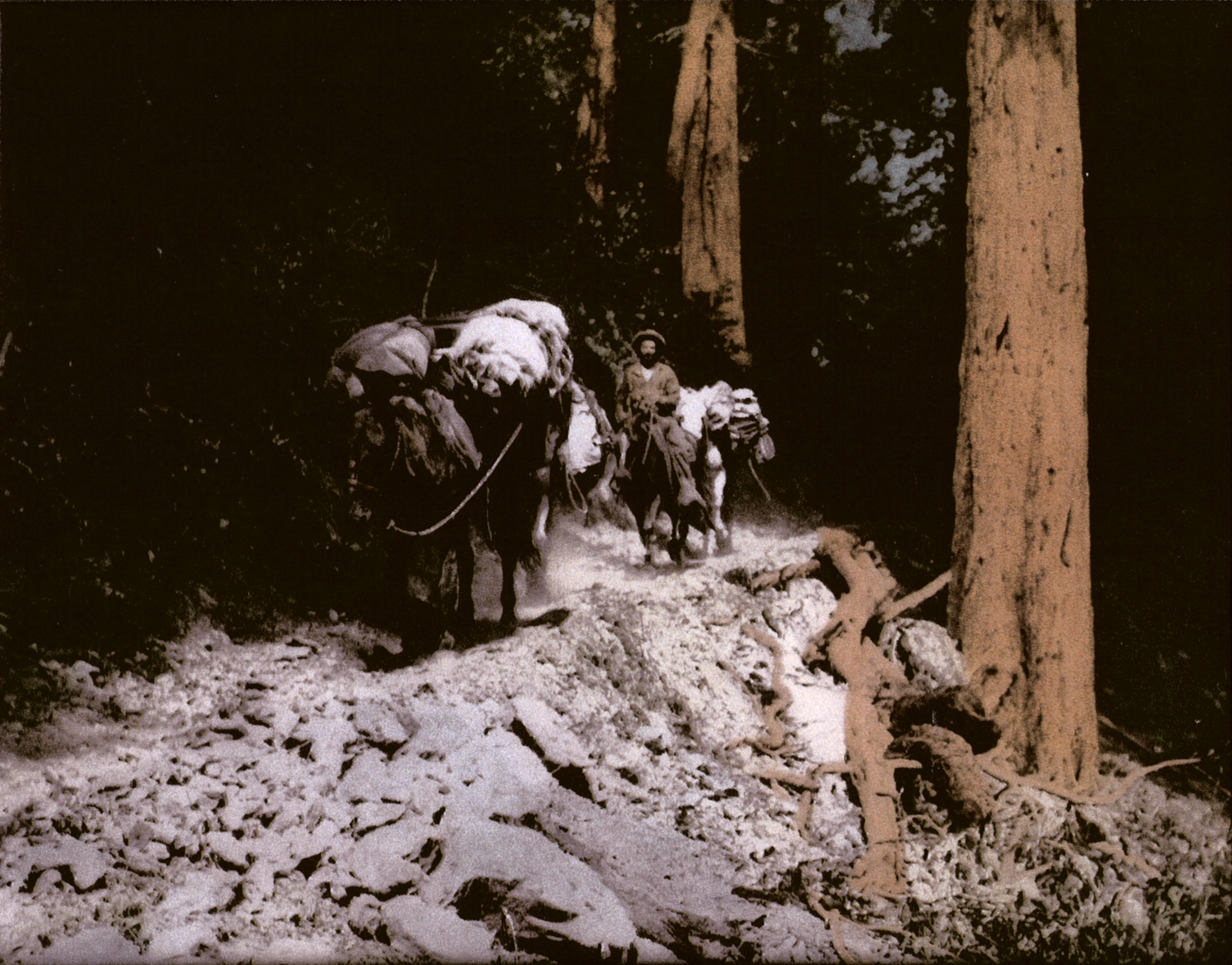
Hand-tinted photograph of local Cowboy Roy Bixby leading pack mules through the redwoods in Palo Colorado Canyon on 1932.

=== Esselen home ===
Before the arrival of Europeans, the land was occupied by the Esselen people. They had a number of seasonal villages located along the Big Sur coast from near present-day Hurricane Point to the vicinity of Vicente Creek in the south, inland to the upper Carmel and Arroyo Seco Rivers. A large boulder with a dozen or more deep mortar bowls worn into it, known as a bedrock mortar, is located in Apple Tree Camp on the southwest slope of Devil's Peak, northeast of Palo Colorado Road.

=== Mission era ===
During the Spanish mission era from 1769 to 1833, the native people were heavily affected by the establishment of three missions (Mission San Carlos Borromeo de Carmelo, Mission Nuestra Señora de la Soledad, and Mission San Antonio de Padua) near them from 1770 to 1791. The native population was decimated by disease, including measles, smallpox, and syphilis, which wiped out 90 percent of the native population, and by conscript labor, poor food, and forced assimilation. Virtually all of the Esselen people's villages within the current Los Padres National Forest were left largely uninhabited.

=== Rancho era ===
Rancho San Jose y Sur Chiquito was first granted in 1835 to Teodoro Gonzalez and re-granted by Governor Juan Alvarado the same year to Marcelino Escobar. It bordered the first mile of Palo Colorado Canyon to the north. It was later owned by Jose Castro and was used for farming and ranching.

=== Adler Ranch ===
Yankee businessman Charles Henry Bixby obtained a patent on April 10, 1889 for 160 acres (65 ha) south of Bixby Creek, and later bought additional tracts of land on the north side of the creek, between it and Palo Colorado Canyon. In the 20th century, Axel Adler built a cabin on the former Bixby Ranch and gradually acquired more land. In 2013, descendants of the Adler family who lived in Sweden put 1,312 acres (531 ha) of the Adler Ranch on the market for $15 million. It is located at the end and south of Palo Colorado Road. The ranch is located along the Little Sur River at the northwestern edge of the Ventana Wilderness adjacent to the Monterey Peninsula Regional Park District's Mill Creek Redwood Preserve, Los Padres National Forest, and includes the peak of Bixby Mountain and the upper portions of Mescal Ridge. The El Sur Ranch and Pico Blanco Mountain are to the south.

The nonprofit Western Rivers Conservancy secured a purchase agreement for the land. It initially wanted to sell the land to the US Forest Service, which would make it possible for hikers to travel from Bottchers Gap to the sea. But some local residents thought the federal agency lacked funding required to maintain a critical fire break on the land.

On October 2, 2019, the California Natural Resources Agency announced it was seeking funding to obtain the land for the Esselen tribe. The Adler family agreed to sell 1,199 acres (485 ha) of the Adler Ranch. In late July 2020 the purchase of the 1,199 acres (485 ha) portion of the Adler Ranch successfully closed and the property was transferred to the Esselen tribe. The land acquisition could help facilitate federal recognition of the tribe.

=== Homesteaders ===
Early homesteaders in the Palo Colorado Canyon region included Samuel L. Trotter (January 23, 1914), George Notley (March 21, 1896), and his brother William F. Notley (May 8, 1901), and Andre Cushing who bought a 40-acre patent just east of the mouth of the canyon. After filing a patent for a homestead, the settler had complete ownership after residing on the property for five years or after six months with payment of $1.50 per acre.

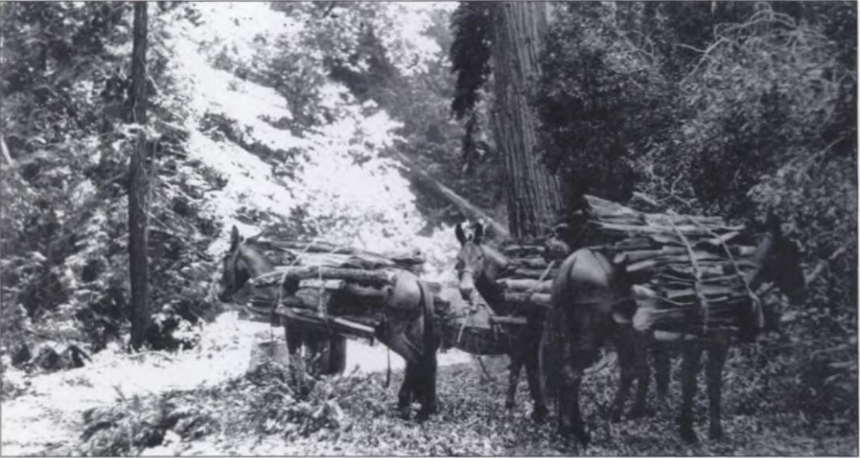
A major forest product of Big Sur coast was the bark of Tanbark Oak trees. The bark, high in tannic acid, was used to cure leather. After the trees were felled, the bark was stripped from the trunks, dried, and then packed out via mule or sleds, called "go-devils" or on wagons.

Notley began harvesting tanoak bark from the canyon, a lucrative source of income at the time. The bark was used to manufacture tannic acid, necessary to the growing leather tanning industry located in Santa Cruz, about 40 miles to the north. Notley constructed a landing at the mouth of the Palo Colorado River like that at Bixby Landing to the south. The tanbark was harvested from the isolated trees inland, corded, brought out by mule back or using wooden sleds, and loaded by cable onto waiting vessels anchored offshore at Notley's Landing.

Swetnam and Trotter worked for the Notley brothers, who harvested Redwood in the Santa Cruz area and expanded operations to include tanbark in the mountains around Palo Colorado Canyon. Swetnam married Adelaide Pfeiffer and bought the Notley home at the mouth of Palo Colorado Canyon for their residence. He also constructed two cabins and a small barn on his patent along the Little Sur River at the site of the future Pico Blanco camp.

Road construction and logging left many steep canyons denuded. The resulting erosion clogged stream with sediment and woody debris for decades after loggers cleared the land and moved their timber to mills and coastal landings.

=== Mill Creek Redwood Preserve ===
A portion of land to the south of Palo Colorado Canyon formerly owned by Charles Henry Bixby was sold to a lumber company in 1986. Their plan to harvest over a million board feet of redwood was only derailed by the savings and loan crisis, when the land was seized by federal financial regulators. They sold the property to the Big Sur Land Trust, which in turn sold it to the Monterey Peninsula Regional Park District in 1988. The district joined it with three adjacent properties to form the Mill Creek Redwood Preserve. The county hired a crew to build a 2.7 miles (4.3 km) trail from Palo Colorado Road to an overlook, which was completed over ten years. Responding to concerns of canyon residents about traffic on narrow Palo Colorado Road, the county agreed to limit access to six permits per day. Visitors are required to obtain a permit in advance from the Monterey Peninsula Regional Park District. The trail head is located 6 miles (9.7 km) inland on Palo Colorado Road.

=== Palo Colorado Association ===
The Palo Colorado Association was formed in 1917 and legally organized in 1928. Its purposes are to provide social and recreational opportunities to its members, manage real and personal property belonging to members, provide upkeep of the association property, and to hire a caretaker to manage their properties. It includes the owners of eleven cabins that are more than 100 years old. The cabins are built of whole logs alongside Palo Colorado Creek and within the first three-tenths of a mile near the entrance to the canyon.

== Fire impact ==
=== Historical fires ===
In 1906, a fire that began in Palo Colorado Canyon from the embers of a campfire burned for 35 days, scorching an estimated 150,000 acres (61,000 ha), and was finally extinguished by the first rainfall of the season.

On August 26, 1924, a fire started in Danish Creek in the Carmel River watershed. It burned 49,400 acres (20,000 ha) until it was extinguished by rainfall on October 4. This was the largest fire for more than 50 years, until the Marble Cone Fire in 1977.

In October, 2007, a fire broke out in a residence in the canyon and spread to nearby brush. About 50 acres (20 ha) were burned. While fighting the fire, Matthew Will, a bulldozer operator with CalFire, was killed when his bulldozer rolled down a steep slope.

=== 2016 Soberanes fire ===
The July 2016 Soberanes Fire was caused by unknown individuals who started and lost control of an illegal campfire in the Garrapata Creek watershed. During the first few days of the fire, it destroyed 57 homes and 11 outbuildings in the Garrapata and Palo Colorado Canyon areas. Fire fighters were able to build lines around parts of the Big Sur community. Robert Oliver Reagan, a bulldozer operator, was killed when his equipment overturned during night operations in Palo Colorado Canyon.

== Population ==
The United States does not define a census-designated place called Palo Colorado Canyon, but it does define a ZIP Code Tabulation Area (ZCTA) 93923, which extends north to include parts of Carmel Valley and Carmel-by-the-Sea, so it is not possible to obtain census data for the canyon itself. According to the 2020–2024 American Community Survey 5-year estimates, ZCTA 93923 had a population of 12,565.

As of 2004, there were about 300 households in the Palo Colorado Canyon area. The residents raised $300,000 to build a firehouse to house the Mid-Coast Fire Brigade, an all-volunteer unit that offers fire protection to the area.

== Government ==
At the county level, Palo Colorado Canyon is represented on the Monterey County Board of Supervisors by Supervisor Dave Potter.

In the California State Legislature, Palo Colorado Canyon is in the 17th senatorial district, represented by Democrat John Laird, and in the 30th Assembly district, represented by Democrat Dawn Addis.

In the United States House of Representatives, Palo Colorado Canyon is in California's 20th congressional district, represented by Republican Vince Fong
