= Van Antwerp =

Van Antwerp is a surname. Notable people with the surname include:

- Edith Chesebrough Van Antwerp (1881–1949), American golfer
- Eugene Van Antwerp (1889–1962), American mayor
- Howard Van Antwerp (1898–1992), American football player and attorney
- Jack Van Antwerp (born 1963), American photojournalist
- Robert L. Van Antwerp, Jr. (born 1950), United States Army general
- Verplanck Van Antwerp (1807–1875), United States Union Army general

== See also ==
- Van Antwerp Building, skyscraper in Mobile, Alabama
