= Camp Pico Blanco =

Summer camp in Monterey County, California

- Camp Pico Blanco patch from the 1960s
- Owner: Silicon Valley Monterey Bay Council
- Headquarters: San Jose, California
- Location: Big Sur, California
- Country: United States
- Coordinates: 36°19′56″N 121°47′51″W
- Founded: 1954
- Website; Camp Pico Blanco

Camp Pico Blanco is an inactive camp of 618 acres (250 ha) (originally 1,445 acres (585 ha)) in the interior region of Big Sur in Central California. It is operated by the Silicon Valley Monterey Bay Council, of the Boy Scouts of America, a new council formed as a result of a merger between the former Santa Clara County Council and the Monterey Bay Area Council in December 2012. The camp is surrounded by the Los Padres National Forest, the Ventana Wilderness, undeveloped private land owned by Graniterock, and is located astride the pristine Little Sur River. The land was donated to the Boy Scouts by William Randolph Hearst in 1948 and the camp was opened in 1955. The camp was closed following the Soberanes Fire in 2017, and remained closed after Palo Colorado Road was severely damaged the following winter. Monterey County has been unable to budget the funds required to fix the road. In April 2022, the Silicon Valley Monterey Bay Council announced that the 18 acres (7.3 ha) camp and its buildings were for sale for $1.8 million, and also offered an adjacent 350 acres (140 ha) of undeveloped wilderness for $1.6 million.

The camp vicinity is an ecologically diverse and sensitive environment containing a number of unique animal and plant species. It is located at 800 feet (240 m) elevation on the North Fork of the Little Sur River south of Carmel, California. Historically, the camp area was visited regularly by the Esselen American Indians, whose food sources included acorns gathered from the Black Oak, Canyon Live Oak and Tanbark Oak in the vicinity of the camp. The camp has been repeatedly threatened by fire, including the Marble Cone Fire of 1977, the Basin Complex fire in 2008, and the 2016 Soberanes Fire, which were successfully kept at bay by fire fighters. The three fires burned entirely around the camp. In 2008 and in 2016 the camp was evacuated as a precautionary measure due to the fires.

Prior council leadership struggled to adhere to government regulations affecting rare and endangered species. In 2002 the camp was impacted by a change in state regulations governing seasonal dams on California rivers that affected the council's dam on the Little Sur River. The dam limits the ability of steelhead that frequent the river to swim upstream. An inspector found fault with how the council filled the dam and the National Oceanic and Atmospheric Administration threatened to fine them up to $396,000. The council responded by installing a $1 million fish ladder and other modifications that satisfied the regulators and allowed the council to continue to use the dam in following years. Expenses related to the fish ladder and the new Hayward Lodge dining hall significantly contributed to the Monterey Bay Area Council's debt, leading to the dissolution of the council and its merger with the Santa Clara Council in December 2012.

The new council leadership began a collaborative process with environmental and regulatory agencies to safeguard the camp environment. It published a vision for the camp that seeks to "appreciate, learn, and practice how we coexist with the beauty of nature around us." In 2013, after the merger was complete, the new leadership invited inspections by public and private organizations. They received high ratings for the improvements they had made to the camp.

About 50% of the known population of the rare Dudley's lousewort is located within the camp's boundaries which led to some friction between the former council and environmentalists.

== Activities ==
The dominant features of the camp are the old growth Coastal Redwoods and the North Fork of the Little Sur River. Camp activities include aquatics, shooting sports at three ranges (archery, rifle, and shotgun shooting), handicraft, nature study, and Scoutcraft skills (including a Skills Patrol area). The camp offers an Adventure Day each Wednesday during camp season which gives Scouts access to a number of activities both in camp and out of camp. In 2007 the camp launched an older Scout program called Pico Pathfinders. The program consists of hiking, outdoor skills learning, shotgun shooting, knife/tomahawk throwing, and craft making.

In 2013, the council hired Abraham Wolfinger as a full-time "naturalist in residence" for the summer season, the first such position created for any Boy Scout camp in the United States. They also adopted a new national program called "Science-Technology-Engineering-Math" that will include topics like Conservation, Earth Science, Fish and Fishing, and Wildlife.

Pico Blanco camp was the home of the Order of the Arrow Lodge Esselen 531 until the councils were merged. The camp also hosts the council's one-week-long National Youth Leadership Training program each summer.

The western or right fork of the trail in Camp Pico Blanco climbs Launtz Ridge 11 miles (18 km) to a fork in the trail, where hikers can take the right fork to U.S. Forest Service campgrounds including Pico Blanco Campground, Pico Blanco Camp, and the Coast Road, or veer left 1.1 km (0.68 mi) to Launtz Creek Camp, Pfeiffer Big Sur State Park and the coast 18 km (11 mi) distant.

Double Cone Trek Waypoints
Campground / Feature
Mileage
Elevation
Coordinates
Botcher's Gap
0 miles (0 km)
2,060 feet (630 m)
36.35385°N 121.81356°W
Devil's Peak Ridge
3.8 miles (6.1 km)
4,075 feet (1,242 m)
36.3674°N 121.7867°W
Pat Springs
8.0 miles (12.9 km)
3,820 feet (1,160 m)
36.36330°N 121.74412°W
Little Pines
10.0 miles (16.1 km)
4,153 feet (1,266 m)
36.35274°N 121.72384°W
Double Cone summit †
15.0 miles (24.1 km)
4,853 feet (1,479 m)
36.29691°N 121.71467°W
Hiding Canyon
14.5 miles (23.3 km)
1,743 feet (531 m)
36.32135°N 121.68550°W
Pine Valley
20 miles (32 km)
3,141 feet (957 m)
36.30107°N 121.63550°W
Pine Ridge
24 miles (39 km)
4,180 feet (1,270 m)
36.27357°N 121.65050°W
Redwood Camp
28.8 miles (46.3 km)
1,800 feet (550 m)
36.25496°N 121.66939°W
Sykes Hot Springs
30.3 miles (48.8 km)
1,259 feet (384 m)
36.24857°N 121.68550°W
Barlow Flats
32.9 miles (52.9 km)
900 feet (270 m)
36.24691°N 121.71273°W
Terrace Creek
36.0 miles (57.9 km)
1,350 feet (410 m)
36.24635°N 121.72912°W
Pfeiffer Big Sur State Park
41.0 miles (66.0 km)
375 feet (114 m)
36.09443°N 121.61913°W
Manual Peak summit
47.0 miles (75.6 km)
1,686 feet (514 m)
36.27413°N 121.77079°W
Tin Shack
50.0 miles (80.5 km)
2,100 feet (640 m)
36.28889°N 121.75667°W
Pico Blanco summit †
51.5 miles (82.9 km)
3,709 feet (1,131 m)
36.31885°N 121.81134°W
Vado Camp
53.0 miles (85.3 km)
1,700 feet (520 m)
36.30413°N 121.78868°W
Launtz Creek
55.2 miles (88.8 km)
1,640 feet (500 m)
36.30941°N 121.79190°W
Camp Pico Blanco
60.2 miles (96.9 km)
793 feet (242 m)
36.33191°N 121.79718°W

† Optional side-trip. Mileage not included in trek total.
Note: the lat/lon values are provided for historical interest - many of these camp locations are not accurate

== Facilities ==
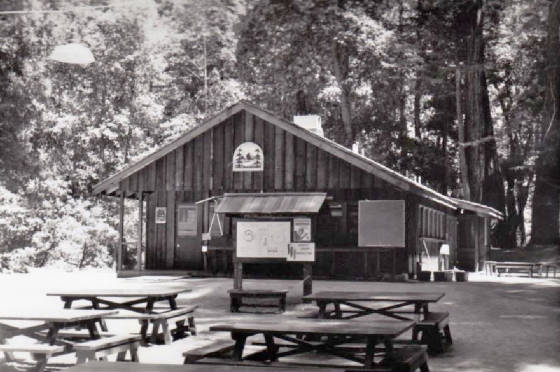
Shown in 1962, the original Bing Crosby Kitchen was built in 1955. The Haywood Dining Lodge completed in 2006 encloses the front of the building.

Original facilities included the Bing Crosby Kitchen built with money donated by the Bing Crosby Fund, funded by the Bing Crosby Pro-Am Invitational. Other facilities also constructed when the camp was first built include an administration building, Catholic Chapel, Presbyterian Chapel, quartermaster's building and trading post, health lodge, staff lodge, handicraft lodge, boat house, the original camp ranger's cabin, bridges, river fords, electrical system, and twelve campsites. The Presbyterian Chapel was built around a cabin constructed by Isaac N. Swetnam in the 1890s. The Catholic Chapel was damaged by a falling tree and was demolished.

In the 1970s, the council erected a warehouse in the vicinity of the original rangers cabin, about .5 miles (0.80 km) outside of the main camp. A new circular, glass-enclosed ranger residence was built about 1 mile (1.6 km) outside of camp on a short ridge spur alongside the entrance road in the mid-1970s. The Staff Lodge was slightly damaged by a tree fall in the 1980s, and Council Executive Dean Crafton opted to demolish the building rather than repair it. The 1980s are referred to by many former camp staff members as "The Dark Decade".

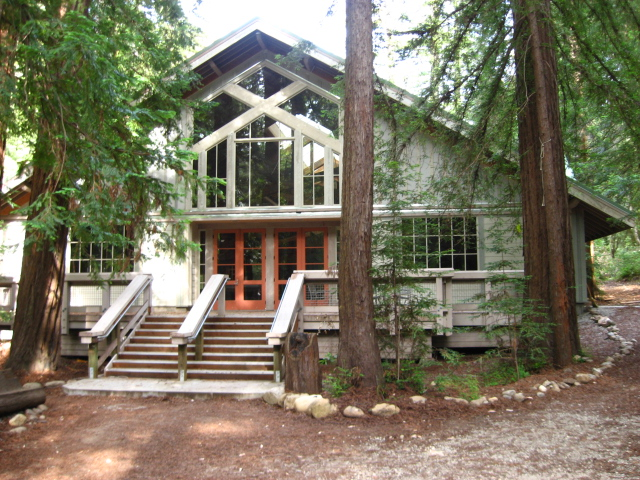
The Haywood Dining Lodge was built to replace an open-air dining area.

== History ==
The area was first occupied by the Esselen indigenous people, who harvested acorns on the nearby mountain slopes. The area's terrain is mostly steep, rocky, semi-arid except for the narrow canyons, and inaccessible, making long-term habitation a challenge. A large boulder with a dozen or more deep mortar bowls worn into it, known as a bedrock mortar, is located in Apple Tree Camp on the southwest slope of Devil's Peak, north of the Camp Pico Blanco. The holes were hollowed out over many generations by Indians who used it to grind the acorns into flour. Other mortar rocks have also been found within the Boy Scout camp at campsites 3 and 7, and slightly upstream from campsite 12, while a fourth is found on a large rock in the river, originally above the river, between campsites 3 and 4. Much of the native Indian population had been forced into the Spanish mission system by about 1822, when most of the interior villages within the current Los Padres National Forest were uninhabited.

When the Big Sur area, along with the rest of California, gained independence from Spain in 1821 and became part of Mexico, the Boy Scout camp area was on the border of the Rancho San Jose y Sur Chiquito land grant to the north and Rancho El Sur to the south.

=== Early land patent holders ===
Pioneer Isaac N. Swetnam obtained a land patent for the property and surrounding area on February 1, 1894. Thomas W. Allen patented the land immediately to the west of Swetnam's claim, including the current location of the Little Sur River camp, on August 4, 1891. Harry E. Morton obtained a patent for the land to the south of Swetnam, including what is known as Fox Camp, on August 21, 1896. On December 31, 1904, Antere P. Lachance took over Allen's patent and filed a claim for the property to the north, including the area of the former camp ranger's home, as well.

Other early homesteaders in the Palo Colorado Canyon region included Samuel L. Trotter (January 23, 1914), George Notley (March 21, 1896), and his brother William F. Notley (May 8, 1901). William Notley took over Mortan's patent. Swetnam and Trotter worked for the Notley brothers, who harvested Redwood in the Santa Cruz area and expanded operations to include tanbark in the mountains around Palo Colorado Canyon. Swetnam married Ellen J. Lawson and bought the Notley home at the mouth of Palo Colorado Canyon for their residence. He also constructed two cabins and a small barn on his patent along the Little Sur River at the site of the future Pico Blanco camp. The original Protestant Chapel was built in 1955 around one of the Swetnam cabins.

=== Patent rights ended ===
In October 1905, the land that now makes up the Los Padres National Forest, including the South Fork and portions of the upper reaches of the North Fork of the Little Sur River watershed, were withdrawn from public settlement by the United States Land Office. On January 9, 1908, 39 sections of land, totaling 25,000 acres (10,000 ha), were added to the Monterey National Forest by President Theodore Roosevelt in a presidential proclamation. This included portions of five sections of land containing the private inholding that is the current site of Camp Pico Blanco.

In 1916, the Eberhard and Kron Tanning Company of Santa Cruz purchased most of the remaining land from the original homesteaders. They brought tanbark timber out on mules and crude wooden sleds known as "go-devils" to Notleys Landing at the mouth of Palo Colorado Canyon, where it was loaded via cable onto ships anchored offshore. William Randolph Hearst was interested in preserving the uncut, abundant redwood forest, and on November 18, 1921, he purchased the land from the tanning company for about $50,000.

=== Prior Camps ===
From 1927 to 1934, area Boy Scouts from the Santa Clara, San Benito and Monterey Bay Council #55 camped at Camp Totocano, located in Swanton, north of Davenport in Santa Cruz county. In April 1933, in the depths of the Great Depression, the Monterey Bay Area Council was organized without camping facilities or suitable funds. In 1934, a makeshift Camp Wing was built within Big Sur State Park, but it was abandoned after the 1937 summer camping season. Camp Esselen was constructed the next year at another location within the Big Sur State Park. This site was improved until 1945, when limitations of the site, closeness to public camping facilities, and jurisdictional conflicts between the Scouts and the state forced the council to request reimbursement from the state for $8,000 in improvements. The council continued to use the camp through August 1953. In 1952, construction began on Camp Pico Blanco, and in 1954 with the opening of Camp Pico Blanco, Camp Esselen was finally closed. Camp Pico Blanco is the oldest Boy Scout camp on the California Central Coast.

=== Road and camp construction ===
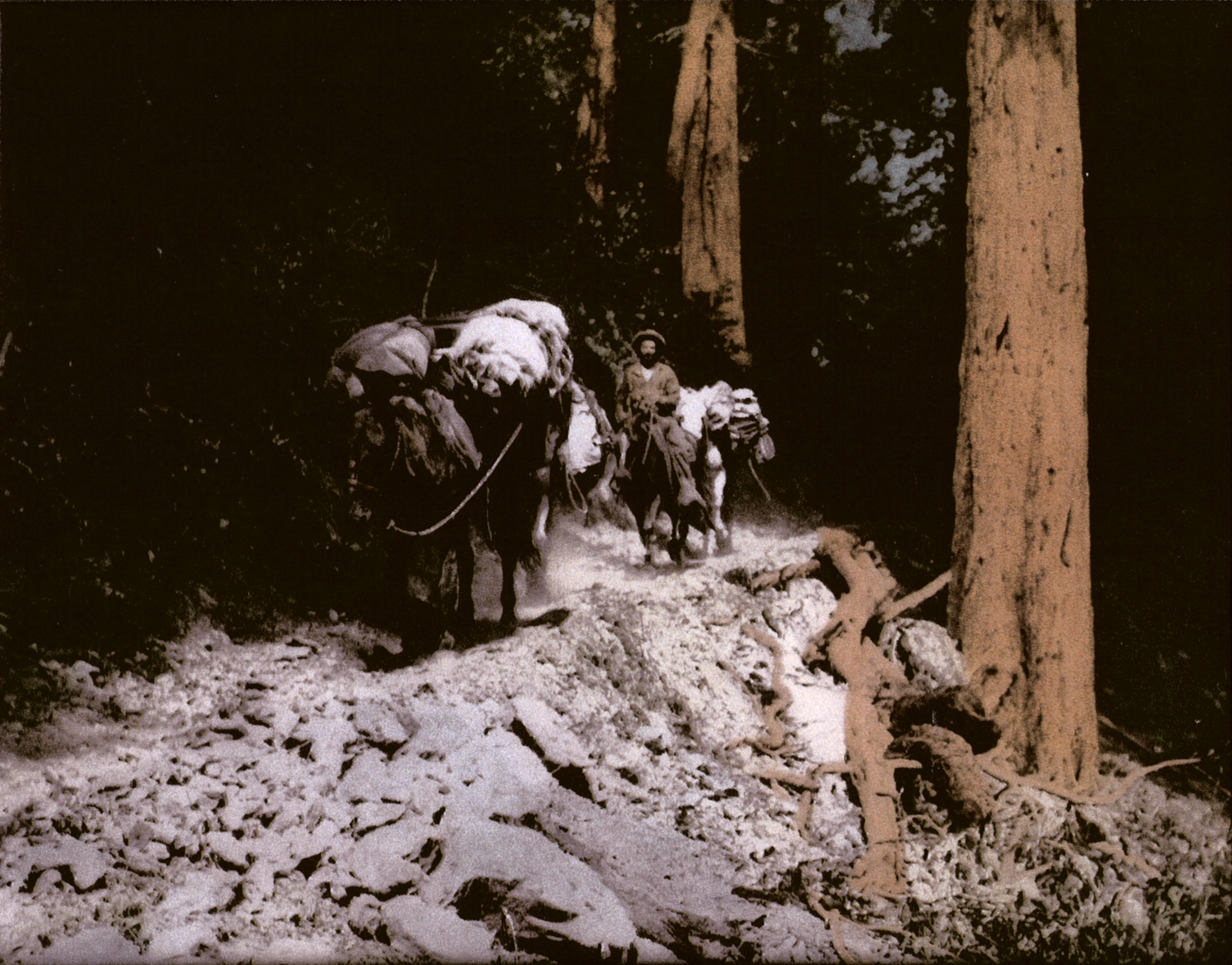
Hand-tinted photograph of local Cowboy Roy Bixby leading pack mules through the redwoods in Palo Colorado Canyon in 1932.

On July 23, 1948, the council purchased the property, originally 1,445 acres (585 ha), from the Hearst Sunical Land and Packing Company for $20,000. On September 9, 1948, Albert M. Lester of Carmel obtained a grant for the council of $20,000 from William Hearst through the Hearst Foundation of New York City, offsetting the cost of the purchase. The council spent about $500,000 in improvements, including $200,000 to build a 8 miles (13 km) road into the camp area.

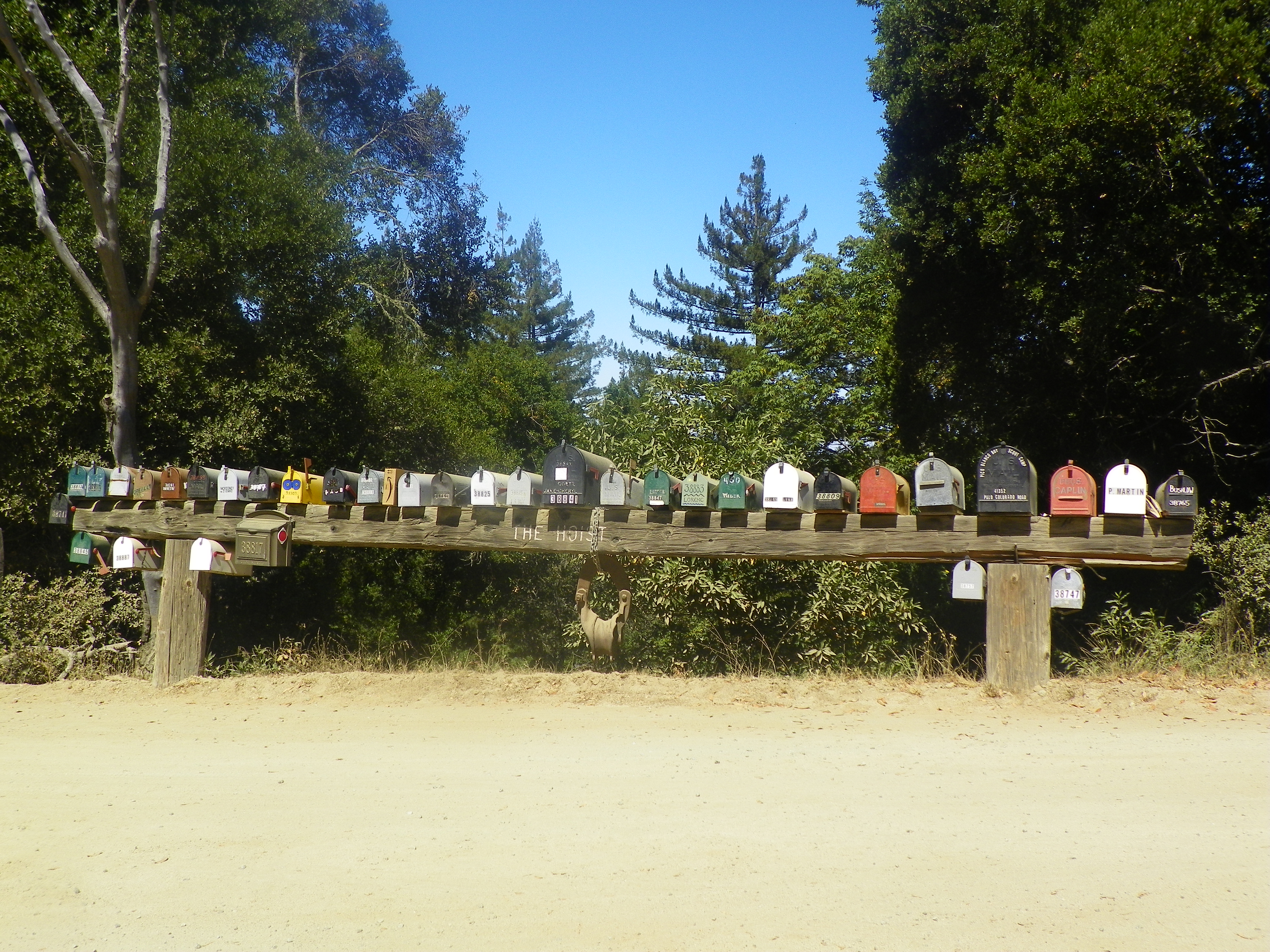
The Hoist is marked by a large pulley hanging from a beam supporting a row of mailboxes on Palo Colorado Canyon Road.

Walter Tavernetti led construction of the 8 miles (13 km) road from Turner Creek to the future camp location. Paul Harlan, a member of a Big Sur pioneer family, had just returned from Oregon where he had farmed for several years. He learned of the project and joined in the effort. Paul became the first camp ranger where he and his wife lived for 10 years.

They persuaded the US Army to loan the services of the United States Army Corps of Engineers. The Army helped build the road from a local area on Palo Colorado Road known as "The Hoist" to Bottchers Gap (2,050 feet (620 m)), the site of former homesteader John Bottcher's home from about 1885 to 1900.

From Bottcher's Gap, the last 3.6 miles (5.8 km) of single lane dirt road traverses extremely steep terrain, requiring four hair-pin switchbacks over 2 miles (3.2 km) of road. The entire road into the central camp area was completed in the summer of 1951. Construction of the central buildings and water systems began in 1953 and the camp was dedicated on May 31, 1954. The council turned over the 4.4 miles (7.1 km) road from The Hoist to Bottcher's Gap to Monterey County in 1958. In 1963, the Council Executive estimated that buying the land at that time would cost the council over $1 million, or nearly $72,562,500 in today's dollars.

In about 1969, the ex-wife of Jules Kohefer, who had operated the Pico Blanco Hunting and Fishing Lodge near Launtz Ridge beginning before World War I, donated to the council 80 acres (32 ha) in the vicinity of Dani Ridge on the northeast slope of Pico Blanco that she had received in the divorce settlement. This steeply sloping piece of property included Redwood trees up to 11 feet (3.4 m) in diameter and raised the total acreage to 1,525 acres (617 ha). The original camp property extended about 2 miles (3.2 km) southward along the Little Sur River, almost to Fish Camp and just short of Jackson Camp.

The Council sold 245 acres (99 ha) to the federal government for about $100,000 shortly after the 1977 Marble-Cone Fire. It later sold about another 525 acres (212 ha) in the 1980s to the federal government for an unknown amount, reducing the camp to about 800 acres (320 ha). In 1990, the Monterey Bay Area Council executive board voted to sell the entire camp, resulting in considerable controversy and opposition. No buyer was found, and in 1992, the executive board voted in closed session to sell half of the camp property for $3 million, but once again no offers were received.

=== Camp debt contributes to merger ===
In December 2012, the Santa Clara Council and the Monterey Bay Area Council were reunited after being separate councils since 1933. The merger announcement cited the expense of building the fish ladder and the Hayward Lodge Dining Hall, resulting in about $1 million in debt, along with declining membership, as contributing to the council's financial problems and making it difficult to continue operations.

=== Closure and potential sale ===
In May 2016, the Palo Colorado Road into camp, and consequently the camp itself, was closed when Rocky Creek washed out a bridge and overflowed the road at milepost 3.3. The bridge was repaired in 2018 but numerous slideouts further south caused major damage. As of June 2023, Monterey County has not announced plans to repair the road.

After four years and with no prospect of reopening the camp, the Silicon Valley Council put the camp up for sale in April 2022. They offered the land in three parcels: a 368 acres (149 ha) section containing Camp Pico Blanco and the immediate area for $1.8 million, and two additional parcels totaling an additional 350 acres (140 ha) of wilderness for $1.6 million. The listing included "approximately 20 buildings totaling ±22,525 square feet. They include a ±7,330 SF dining hall and kitchen, admin office, rangers residence, health lodge, nature lodge, church, rifle, archery, and shotgun ranges, an open air campfire bowl with seating, numerous campsites, a trading post, a waterfront building, several bridges, a seasonal dam with a fish ladder, and numerous freestanding bathrooms."

The council's deputy scout executive told the press in April 2022 that the council chose to sell the camp due to damage to the roads caused by wildfires, making the camp inaccessible and unusable. He emphasized the decision was not driven by a need to raise funds to pay sexual-assault judgments, which has driven many councils to sell their camps. “Most specifically, we are not selling it for financial need, but because Scouts can’t use it.” However, proceeds from the sale of the 350 acres (140 ha) wilderness parcel that is being sold separately will be funneled to the national council to help pay victims of sexual assault. Local councils are being required to contribute $515 million to the $2.7 billion fund. If the local council cannot sell the wilderness parcel, they can transfer the land to the national council. Money from the sale of the immediate camp property will be used to benefit members of the local council.

On June 26, 2022, the White Stag Leadership Development Academy, the Esselen Tribe of Monterey County, and Camp Krem Camping Unlimited, calling themselves the Pico Blanco Partners, submitted a proposal to the Silicon Valley Monterey Bay Council to acquire the 18 acres (7.3 ha) parcel containing Camp Pico Blanco. Other groups had also submitted proposals and offered larger amounts, but the council chose to enter into an exclusive negotiation agreement with the partnership because they indicated an interest in preserving its availability to Scouts.

== Environmental issues ==
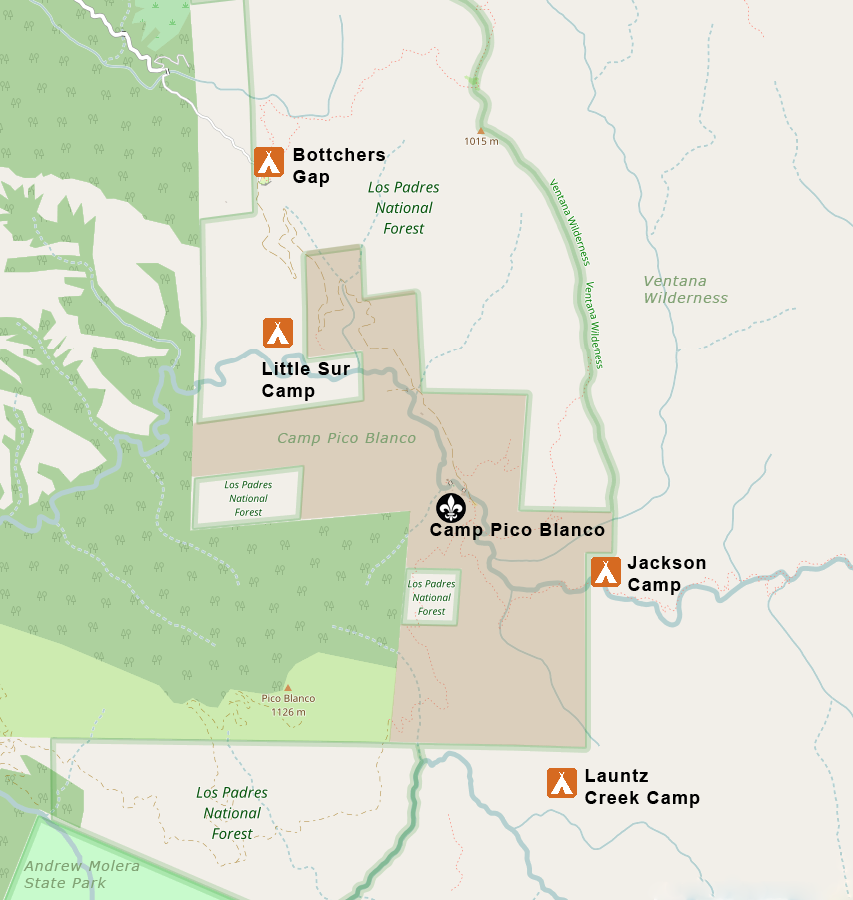
Former boundaries and vicinity of Camp Pico Blanco.

The camp is located at 800 feet (240 m) astride the North Fork of the Little Sur River, 11.3 miles (18.2 km) south of Carmel, California on Highway 1, and south-east on Palo Colorado Road 13 miles (21 km).

=== Environmentally sensitive habitat ===
The camp is bordered on the east and south by the Ventana Wilderness; on the north by the Los Padres National Forest; and on the west by both the Los Padres Forest and Mount Pico Blanco, which is largely owned by Graniterock.

The redwood forest habitat, the riparian corridor, and the populations of rare plants are considered environmentally sensitive habitat areas. The camp area is host to a number of unique animal and plant species, including the threatened steelhead, the rare Dudley's lousewort, the rare Santa Lucia fir, the California Coastal Redwood, and others. The council originally committed to preserve the camp as a "primitive area where the American boy can have the inestimable experience of untouched wilderness and unspoiled natural beauty."

=== Geology ===
A conservation plan prepared for the camp in 1988 noted that the camp is located on the Palo Colorado Fault, part of the San Gregorio-Hosgri Fault, a branch of the San Andreas Fault complex. The camp area is rated on a 1-6 scale at 6 for the potential for landslides and erosion. Portions of the narrow dirt road are on a steep slope and is vulnerable to slides. It was temporarily closed in 1967 and again in 1969 due to mudslides.

=== Fire impact ===
In January 1978, the winter after the 1977 Marble-Cone Fire that burned entirely around the camp, the lower elevation of the camp adjacent to the Little Sur River were flooded. The Trading Post and the Quartermaster Building, normally more than a 100 feet (30 m) from the river's edge, were in water up to 5 feet (1.5 m) deep. The Boathouse adjacent to the dam area was almost completely submerged. The floods also took out all of the foot bridges across the river which took the council several years to replace.

The 2008 Basin Complex fire destroyed the new residence for the camp ranger on a ridge alongside the entrance road, the camp's climbing wall, the shooting range, portions of the water system, and the COPE course. The council was forced to divert Scouts to another location for that summer. Scouting volunteers applied for a grant from The Central California Friends of NRA, who contributed a $55,000 grant towards repairing the range in 2012. Volunteers contributed many hours over several years to rebuild the range. The grant was the largest awarded to any group by the NRA friends in the Central California area. After the fire, the council obtained a permit to cut 38 old-growth redwood trees, some more than 200 years old, that endangered the camp property and participants. After removing some of the trees as permitted, they cut another of these trees in 2011 after the permit expired, violating the original permit.

During the 2016 Soberanes Fire, fire fighters from Sierra Hotshots, Kings County, and the U.S. Forest Service successfully protected the camp as the fire burned around it. As some trees on the steep slopes above camp burned and threatened the camp, they were too dangerous to fell, so the Forest Service used explosives to blow up a half-dozen of them. The blaze destroyed about 10,000 feet (3,000 m) of water line and one small outbuilding. It burned the entire Little Sur River watershed upstream of the camp, and downstream as far as the Old Coast Road. The fire contributed to erosion problems during the 2016-17 winter. Several portions of the Palo Colorado road were washed out during heavy rains in February 2017 closing off access to the camp.

=== Camp inspections ===
On July 9, 2013, the National Council of the Boy Scouts of America inspected the camp and found only two deficiencies, one related to the new, yet to be trained camp ranger and the other in the camp's conservation program. But they noted that specific plans for improvement were already in place. The inspection noted that the merger of the Monterey Bay Area and Santa Clara County Council had produced "very positive and noticeable changes for this camp."

The council also sought an inspection by the state Division of Forestry which found no violations, and arranged a visit by representatives of the California Native Plant Society, who praised the new leadership of the council for their cooperative and collaborative attitude. The Scouts engaged EMC Planning Group, an environmental consulting firm, to help the council develop a conservation and land management plan for the camp.

=== Dudley lousewort ===
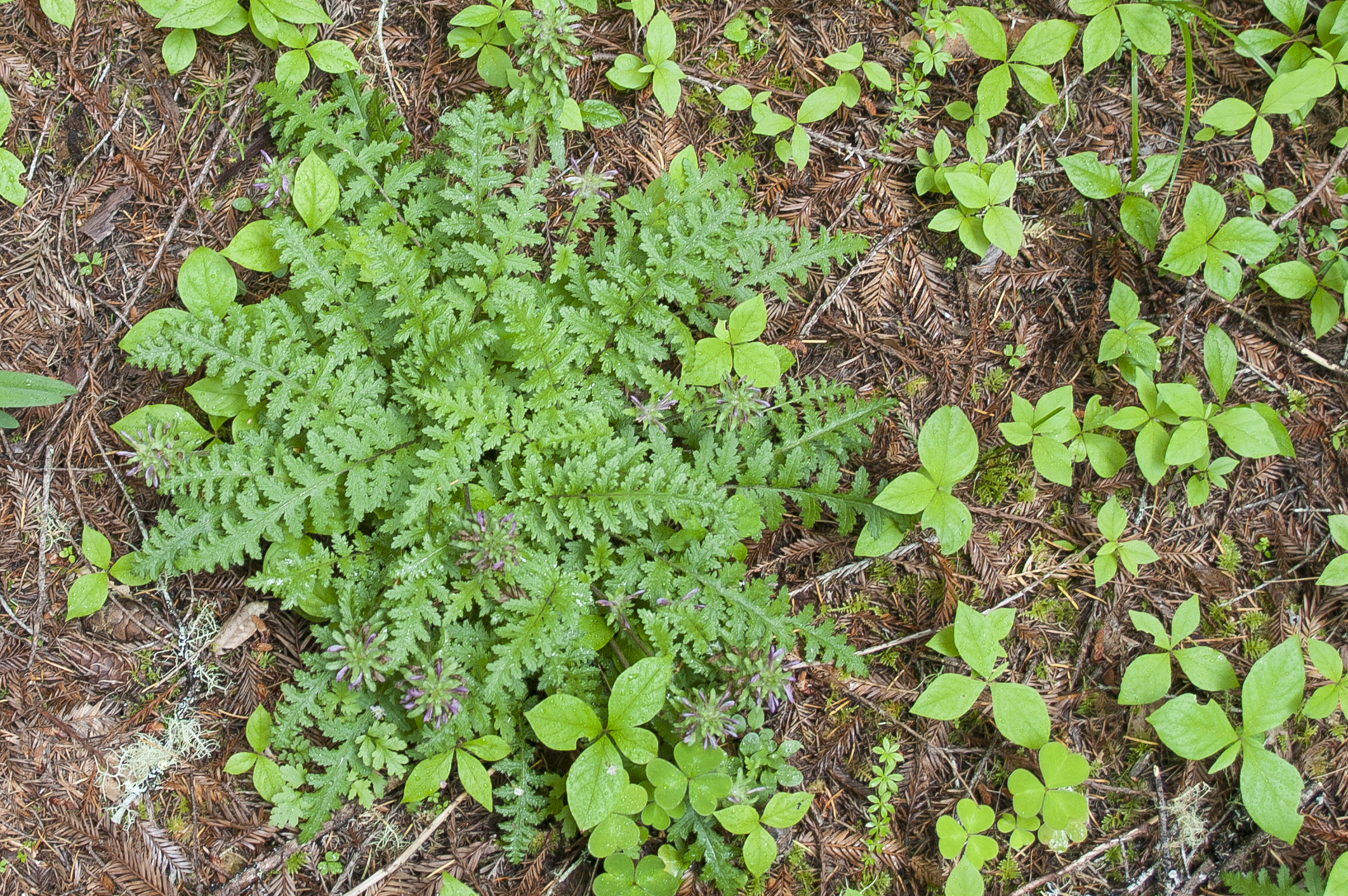
Dudley lousewort (Pedicularis dudleyi) growing near Portola Redwoods State Park.

The camp environment supports a large population of the rare Dudley's lousewort at the site of the former Catholic Chapel. The former Monterey Bay Area Council was criticized for damaging the environment necessary to sustain the plant, which is protected by the California Native Plant Protection Act, the California Environmental Quality Act and the Little Sur River Protected Waterway Management Plan. The current Silicon Valley Monterey Bay Council has invited naturalists and others to review their stewardship policies and actions.

The species was named for 19th-century Stanford University botanist William Dudley. It only grows at the base of Douglas fir trees, relying on the tree's fungal network to obtain water, nitrogen and phosphorus. Fewer than 10 locations are known to support the plant, and the site within the camp contains about 50% of the known specimens. Monterey County cited the former Monterey Bay Area Council in 1989 for their "repeated destruction of Dudley's lousewort and its habitat."

Eagle Scout and science teacher Kim Kuska, who as a teenager once served as the camp's Nature Director, was helping the California Native Plant Society study the plant and to protect it beginning in the 1970s. When the council obtained a permit to remove 38 damaged trees after a fire in 2008, wood cuttings were left on top of the lousewort. Kuska meticulously documented the plant population and jealously guarded the plant. He received a permit from the California Department of Fish and Game to plant additional specimens of the plant, but only after he obtained the council's permission for locations within the camp's boundaries.

When the council rebuffed his efforts to plant new specimens within the camp, Kuska contacted the Center for Investigative Reporting in the summer of 2012. They wrote an article describing the prior council's actions at the camp. Kuska was then informed by lawyers representing the Monterey Bay Area Council that he could only visit the camp under supervision. But in September 2012 they declined to renew his Scouting membership without explanation, effectively expelling him from the organization. Kuska says his membership wasn't renewed because he was a whistle-blower and exposed the Scouts' environmental carelessness. Ron Schoenmehl, director of support services for the council, had previous experience with sensitive issues at a Scout camp. According to Schoenmehl, Kuska had been planting lousewort in new, high-traffic areas near the camp's generator, health lodge, and camping area without the council's permission, which his permit required him to obtain. Since the council is obligated to protect the plant wherever it grows, Schoenmehl said that lousewort in those areas would restrict the camp's use of those areas.

=== Steelhead ===
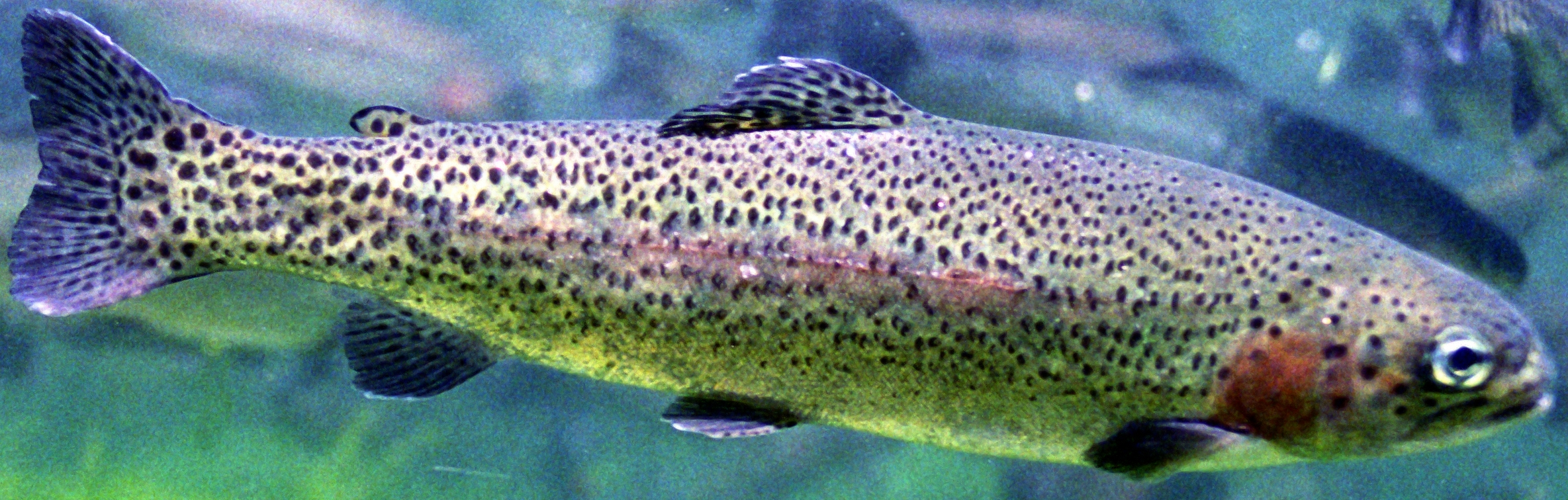
Steelhead (Oncorhynchus mykiss)

The Little Sur River is prime habitat for the threatened South-Central California Coast Distinct Population Segment of steelhead. When the camp was constructed in 1955, the council built a seasonal, 11 feet (3.4 m) high, 75 feet (23 m) long concrete flash board dam on the river. When filled each summer, the dam creates a small recreational impoundment about 2 acres (0.81 ha) in size. In 1990, the council widened and deepened the impoundment basin behind the dam, and Assistant Council Executive Robert Lambert pleaded no contest to four violations of the Department of Fish and Game code prohibiting modifying the stream bed without a permit.

In 2001, the California legislature enacted new regulations to protect steelhead that required the California Department of Fish and Game to inspect all recreational summer dams. In July 2001, Jonathan Ambrose, a fisheries service biologist, visited the camp and told camp officials that trout in the Little Sur River could be harmed if the dam provided insufficient flow downstream.

In April 2002, the council submitted an incomplete application for the renewal of the dam permit and turned in the missing information after the original due date. The Department of Fish and Game told the Monterey Bay Area Council they could not fill the dam until the permit was complete, an environmental review was conducted, and a site visit was made. They had a number of inspections pending and told staff they could not inspect the camp's dam before their summer camp began.

The Council wanted to fill the dam in time for their short, three-week summer camping season. When Fish and Game would not make an exception, the Council contacted California State Senator Bruce McPherson, Vice-Chairman of the California State Senate Environmental Quality Committee, who called the head of Fish and Game, Robert Hight. Hight, now a judge, commented, "We received political pressure from legislators all the time, but we always did the right thing."

On June 3, the Monterey County Herald ran a story titled, "Scouts' summer fun dries up." A Department of Fish and Game deputy director contacted the supervisor of the individual charged with enforcing the permit, and soon afterward Fish and Game changed its mind and allowed the council to fill the dam without the required permits.

On July 8, 2002, the camp staff began installing the flash boards to fill the dam. A fisheries service special agent videotaped the flash board installation and found the Council did not have the required water flow gauge installed and had not retained a biologist to assist with the installation. The camp staff initially indicated they would take a week to fill the dam, although an unnamed parent told the agent that the dam would be filled in one day, as usual. Two days later, in violation of the agreement with the National Marine Fisheries Service, an unidentified camp staff member filled the 11 feet (3.4 m) deep dam in less than one day. The agent returned later in the day and found in the river bed below the dam 30 recently killed steelhead, stranded and suffocated. He reported that more were likely killed but had been eaten by raccoons and birds. Assistant Council Executive Ron Walsh commented, "Why the fish died is anybody's guess."

The agent observed that the knife gate—an opening at the base of the dam that was supposed to stay open to permit continued stream flow—was shut, a violation of the Endangered Species Act. The National Oceanic and Atmospheric Administration, parent agency of the fisheries service, asked the Scouts to stop using the dam until they modified it to meet current standards and obtained the required permits. They told the Council it could face a fine of up to $396,000 for violating the Endangered Species Act. After intervention by Representative Sam Farr, a recognized pro-environment legislator endorsed by the Sierra Club Political Committee, the Fisheries Service retreated from preventing the Scouts from operating the dam.

In June 2003, the Scouts agreed to install a fish ladder, modify the dam's spillway, educate Scouts at camp about threatened species, and enhance the stream bed habitat for fish. Instead of paying a fine, the San Francisco Chronicle reported in 2006 that the council paid more than $1 million, including legal fees, to construct a custom fish ladder for use when the dam is full and a juvenile vertical-slot fish passage ladder in the spillway. The fish ladder is a unique design that allows the fish to swim upstream or downstream when the flashboards are installed. The design had not been used in the United States beforehand. It was designed by Swanson Hydrology + Geomorphology and built by Don Chapin Company. The fish ladders significantly improved fish passage.

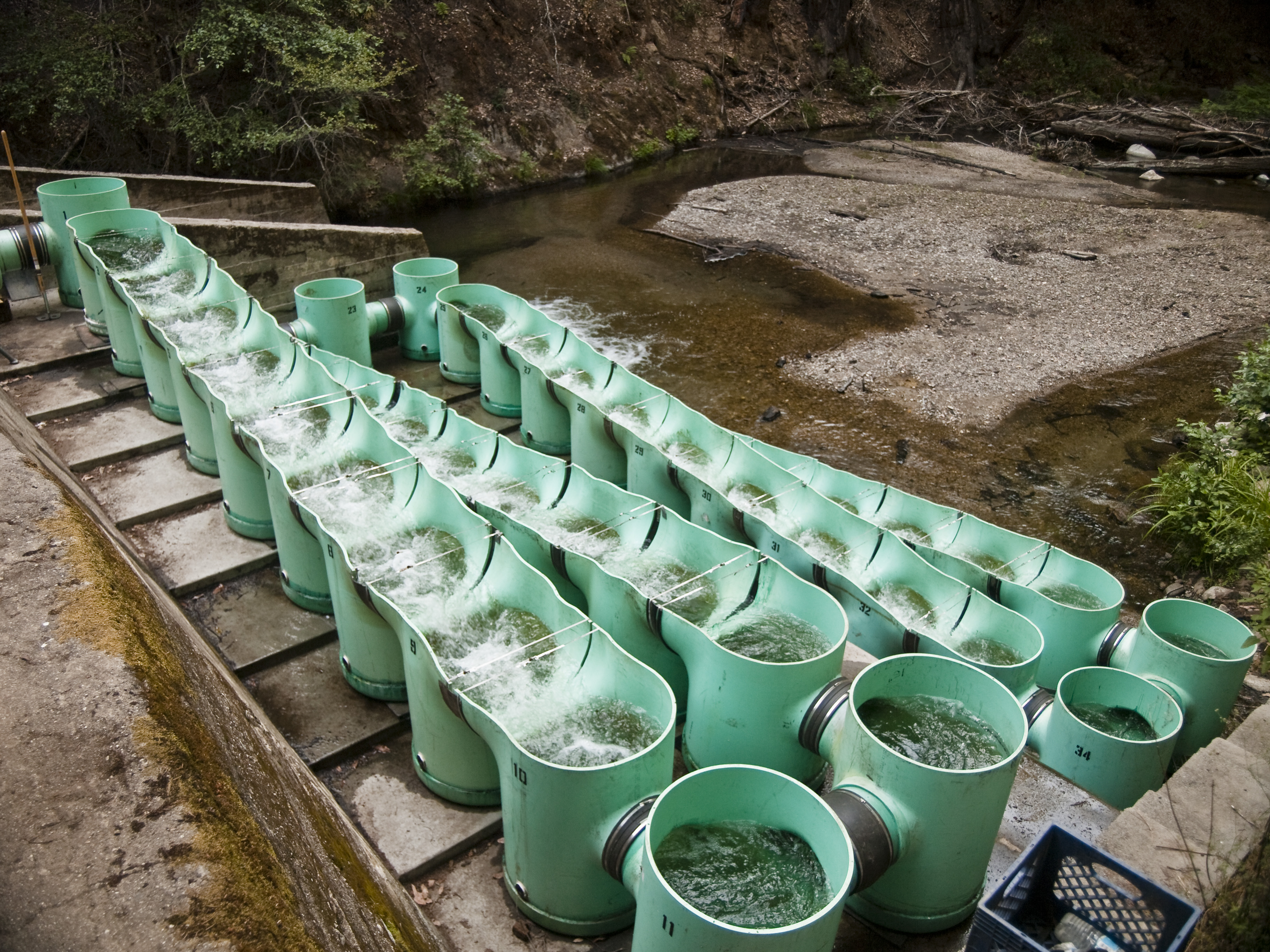
The bidirectional custom fish ladder, the first of its kind built in the United States, at the Pico Blanco camp dam.

Environmental activists accused the council of using political pull to avoid the fines. McPherson and Farr confirmed that the Council requested that they contact regulators. Granite Construction, whose president David H. Watts is a member of the council board, gave $35,000 to McPherson. McPherson also received $5,000 from Chapin Construction, headed by Donald Chapin. Rep. Sam Farr attended Camp Pico Blanco as a boy and his father Fred Farr contributed to the camp's development. When asked about the dam and its impact on the river, Farr stated that the dam has been there for almost 50 years. "The rules had changed and nobody knew what the rules would be," he said. "All the Boy Scouts asked is how to operate the dam properly." When asked about the influence of the $2000 campaign contribution he received from Granite Construction in 2006, he replied, "That's the analogy that I suggested was insulting. It was like somebody on the PTA gave Sam Farr a contribution."

== Notable camp alumni ==
- Sam Farr, State Representative and Member of Congress
- Robert J. Mazzuca, former Chief Scout Executive, Boy Scouts of America
- Harold M. Koenig, 37th Surgeon General of the U.S. Navy

== See also ==
- Ventana Wilderness
