= Notleys Landing, California =

Unincorporated community in California, United States

Notleys Landing
- Unincorporated community
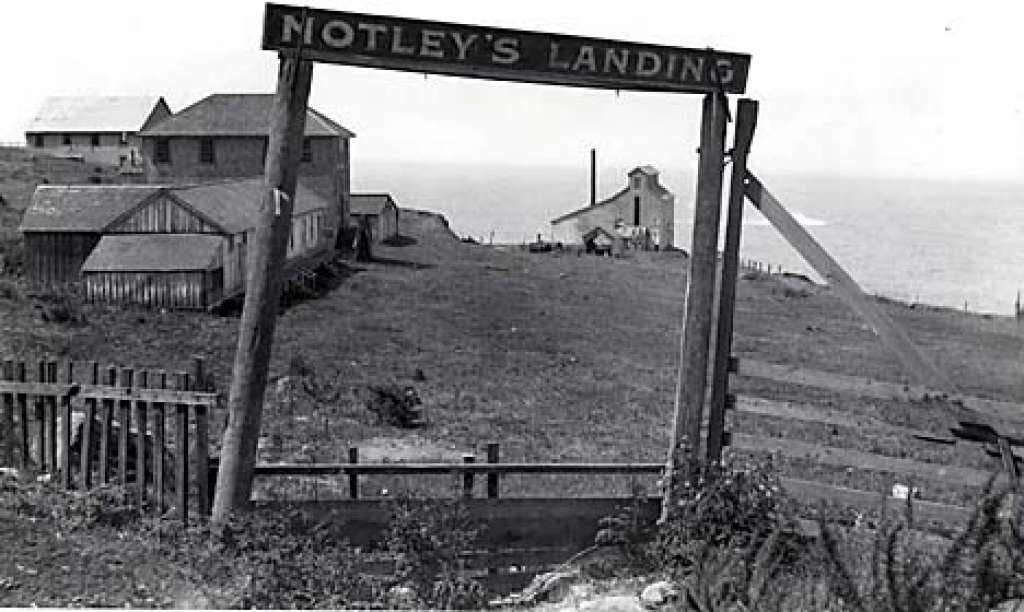
- Notleys Landing, Big Sur. in 1914

- Location in California Notleys Landing (the United States)
- Coordinates: 36°23′54″N 121°54′13″W
- Country: United States
- State: California
- County: Monterey
- Established: 1896
- Elevation: 112 ft (34 m)

Notleys Landing (also, Notley's Landing) is an uninhabited former hamlet in the Big Sur region of Monterey County, California, United States. It was located near the mouth of the Palo Colorado Canyon 11 miles (18 km) south of the Carmel River, at an elevation of 112 feet (34 m).

== History ==
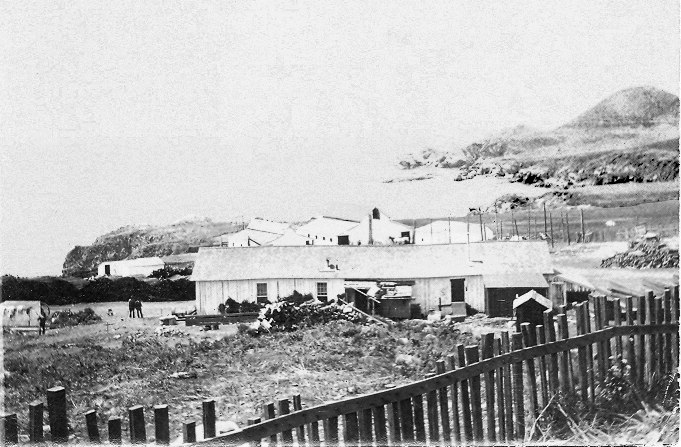
Notley's Landing in 1904 from the south.

Early homesteaders in the area included George Notley (March 21, 1896), his brother William F. Notley (May 8, 1901), Isaac N. Swetnam, who obtained a land patent for property along the Little Sur River and surrounding area on February 1, 1894. and Samuel L. Trotter (January 23, 1914).

Swetnam and Trotter worked for the Notley brothers, who harvested Redwood in the Santa Cruz area and expanded operations to include tanbark in the mountains around Palo Colorado Canyon. Swetnam married Ellen J. Lawson and bought the Notley home at the mouth of Palo Colorado Canyon for their residence. He also constructed two cabins and a small barn on his patent along the Little Sur River at the site of the future Pico Blanco Boy Scout camp.

G.C. Notley company’s purchased the schooner Confianza, and a second ship named the Acme from San Francisco to pick up cargo at Notley’s Landing, including 400 cords of tanbark destined for San Francisco in 1904.

The cabin at the mouth of Palo Colorado Canyon still stands. The side of the home facing Highway 1 used to be the rear of the building when the original wagon road ran on the eastern side of the building. William and Godfrey Notley built a landing to ship lumber and to receive goods at the location. It was used heavily between 1903 and 1907, and a small settlement grew up around it for a few years. But as the supply of readily harvestable tanbark and redwood dwindled, the doghole port was little used. It was abandoned in 1937 when Highway 1 was completed.

During Prohibition, a dance hall was located just south of the landing, "the wildest dance hall on the coast", according to Big Sur historian Jeff Norman. "During the Prohibition era, the landing served the needs of Carmel's drought-stricken populace. It was conveniently close, but just outside the effective limits of police scrutiny." The bar developed a notorious reputation, and "was frequented by the lime kiln workers, mainly Italians, and every Sunday morning dead Italians would be found in the woods."

Except for the Swetnam cabin, all of the buildings have burned or been dismantled. The concrete foundation of the hoist is still visible.

== Current use ==
In 2001, the Big Sur Land Trust bought the approximately 6 acres (2.4 ha) site 11 miles (18 km) south of Carmel for just under $1 million from Rose Ulman, whose family had owned it for several decades. The trust received financial support from the Catherine L. and Robert O. McMahan Foundation, the Barnet J. Segal Charitable Trust, and the Robert V. Brown and Patricia M. Brown Monterey Fund. They announced they intended to open it to the public with hiking trails, although as of 2022 the site is still fenced and closed to the public.
