= Cheseborough (disambiguation) =

Cheseborough was a 19th-century American ship which wrecked off the coast of Japan in 1889.

Cheseborough may also refer to:

- Cheseborough, a variation of a C-Clamp (stagecraft)
- Albert S. Cheseborough, designer of the USS Oneida (SP-432)

== See also ==
- Cheeseborough (disambiguation)
- Chesebrough (disambiguation)
- Cheesebrough (disambiguation)
- Chesebro
