= Cheesebrough =

Cheesebrough may refer to:

- Albert Cheesebrough (1935–2020), English footballer

== See also ==
- Cheeseborough (disambiguation)
- Cheseborough (disambiguation)
- Chesebrough (disambiguation)
- Chesebro
