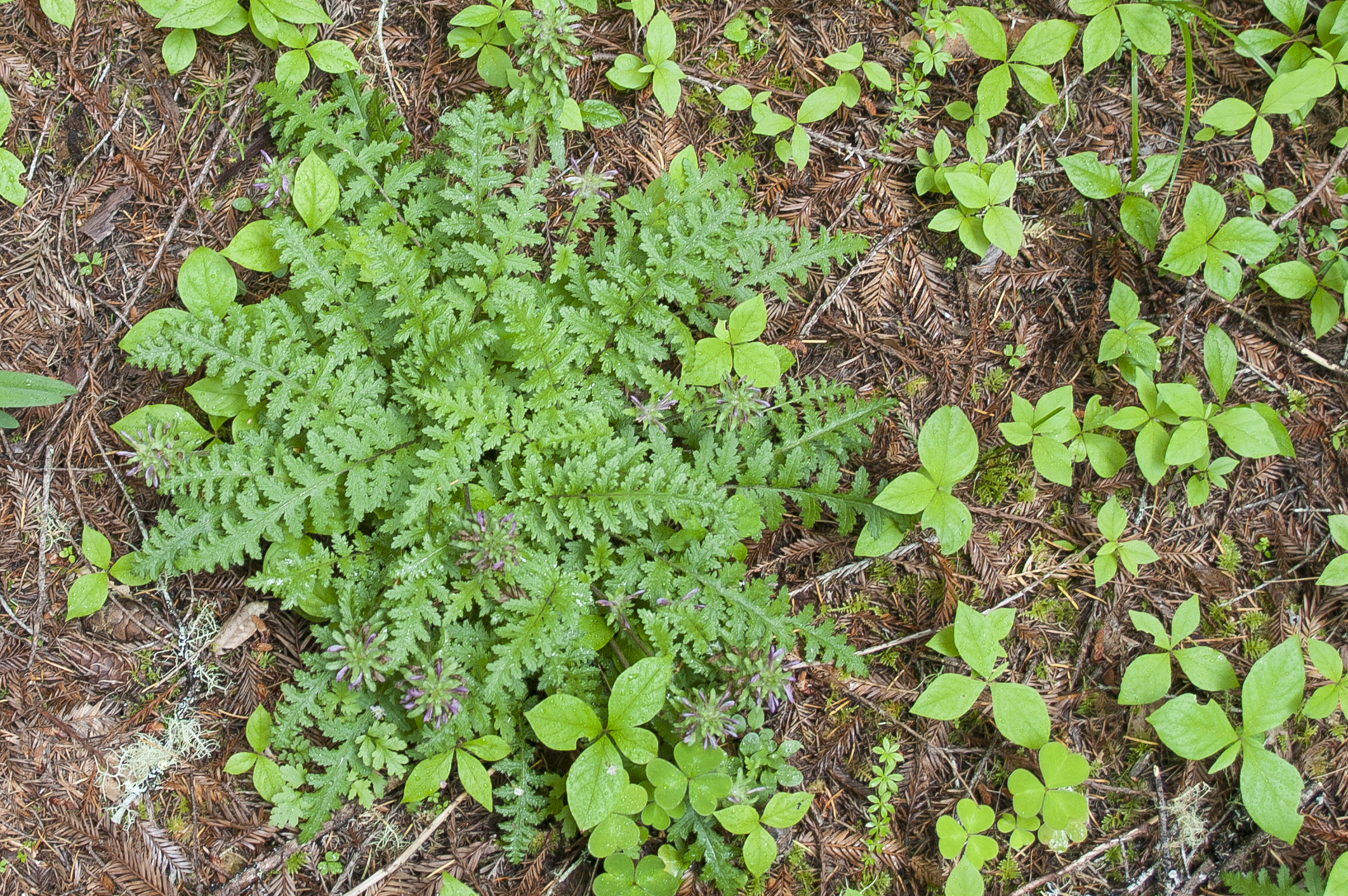

Conservation status
- Imperiled (NatureServe)

Scientific classification
- Kingdom: Plantae
- Clade: Tracheophytes
- Clade: Angiosperms
- Clade: Eudicots
- Clade: Asterids
- Order: Lamiales
- Family: Orobanchaceae
- Genus: Pedicularis
- Species: P. dudleyi

Binomial name
- Pedicularis dudleyi Elmer

= Pedicularis dudleyi =

Species of tree

Pedicularis dudleyi is a rare species of flowering plant in the family Orobanchaceae known by the common name Dudley's lousewort. It is endemic to central California, where it is known from about ten scattered occurrences along the coast and in the coastal mountain ranges. It has been found in three locations along the Central California coast. The species was named for 19th-century Stanford University botanist William Dudley.

== Description ==
The species is a hairy perennial herb and produces one or more stems 10 to 30 centimetres (3.9 to 11.8 in) tall from a caudex. The leaves are up to 26 centimetres (10 in) long and divided into many toothed lobes or lobed leaflets. The inflorescence is a raceme of flowers occupying the top of the stem. Each flower is up to 2.4 centimetres (0.94 in) long and club-shaped, with a hood-like upper lip and a three-lobed lower lip. The flower is light pink or purplish with darker markings. At the base of the flowers are long-haired bracts and woolly sepals. The fruit is a capsule roughly 1 centimetre (0.39 in) long containing seeds with netted surfaces.

== Locations ==
The plant thrives only among old-growth trees, depending on redwood leaf litter and on a complex array of fungi that grows on the roots of the trees. Fewer than 10 known locations are known to support the plant in three areas along the Central California coast, including specific sections of Pescadero Creek in the Santa Cruz Mountains, the Arroyo De La Cruz In the South Santa Lucia Mountains, and one site within the boundary of Boy Scout Camp Pico Blanco. That location at the site of the former Catholic Chapel contains about 50% of the known specimens. Monterey County cited the Scouts in 1989 for their "repeated destruction of Dudley's lousewort and its habitat." When the council cut 38 damaged trees after a fire in 2003, wood cuttings were piled on top of the lousewort.
