= Bottchers Gap =

Campground and trailhead in California, US

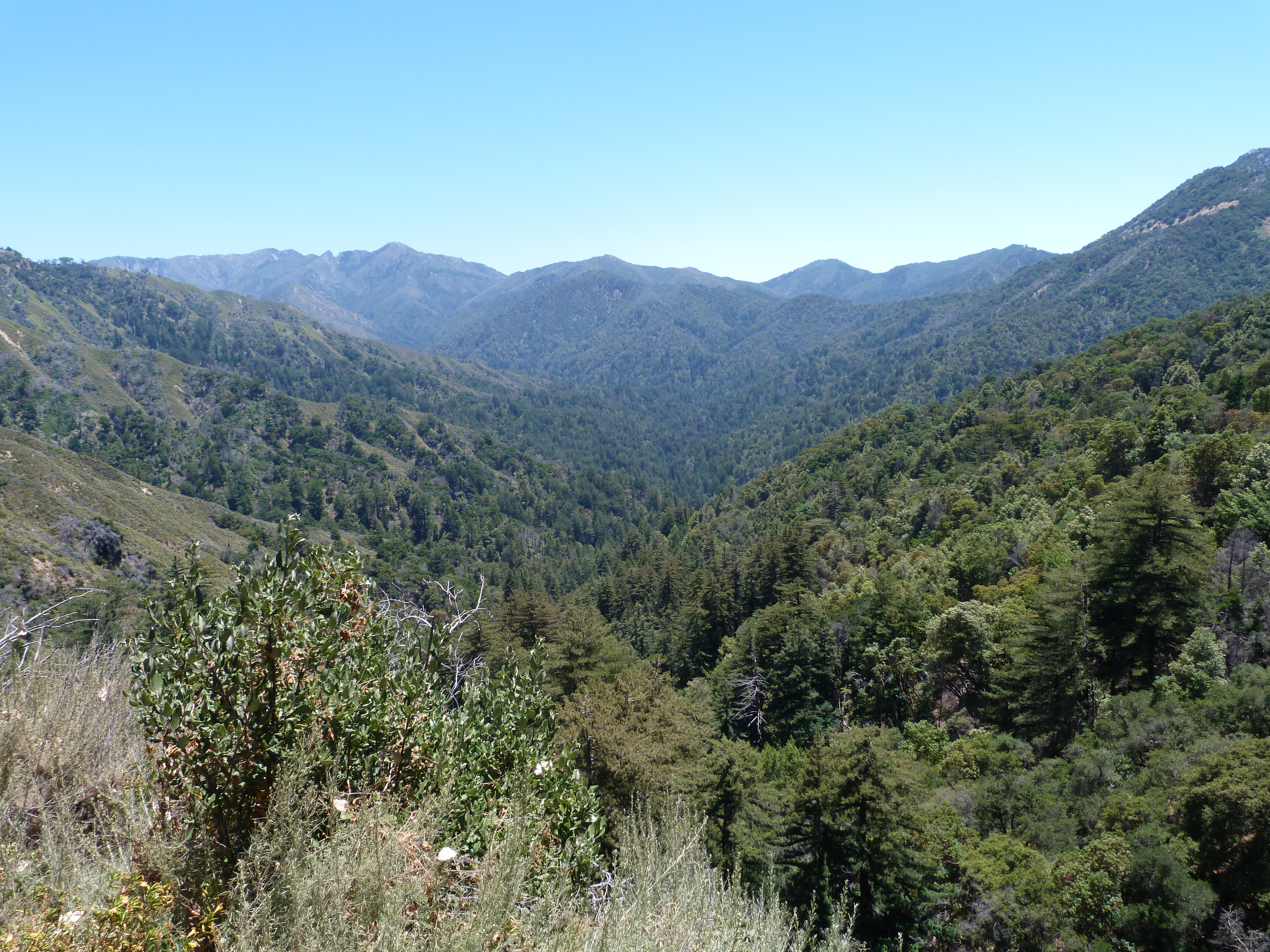
- Ventana Wilderness from Bottchers Gap
- Interactive map of Bottchers Gap
- Location: Monterey County, California
- Coordinates: 36.3538516°N 121.8135641°W
- Elevation: 2,060 feet (630 m)
- Type: Trailhead, day-use, campground
- Land: Los Padres National Forest/Ventana Wilderness
- Campsites: 12
- Facilities: Fire rings, restroom, picnic tables, BBQ grills
- Water: None
- Fee: $20 campsite; $10 parking day use
- Fires: During fire season, permit required
- Season: Year-round (currently closed)
- Operated by: Camp One
- Established: 1951
- Website: Bottchers Gap Campround

Bottchers Gap (sometimes spelled Botcher's Gap) (closed as of September 2016) is a day-use area, campground, and trailhead in Monterey County, California. It is located 7.6 miles (12.2 km) from the Big Sur Coast Highway at the end of Palo Colorado Road on the northern border of the Los Padres National Forest and Ventana Wilderness. It is located between Mescal Ridge and Skinner Ridge. From Bottchers Gap, there is an 3.3-mile-long (5.3 km) private access road that leads to Camp Pico Blanco. Beginning at Bottchers Gap, it is a difficult 14.7-mile (23.7 km) hike via the Skinner Ridge and Ventana Double Cone trails to the Ventana Double Cone, making it one of the more remote locations in the wilderness.

== History ==
=== Native Americans ===
The area was first occupied by the Esselen indigenous people, who harvested acorns on the nearby mountain slopes. The terrain is mostly steep, rocky, semi-arid except for the narrow canyons, and inaccessible, making long-term habitation a challenge. A large boulder with a dozen or more deep mortar bowls worn into it, known as a bedrock mortar, is located in Apple Tree Camp on Turner Creek, southwest of Devil's Peak and 3.2 miles (5.1 km) northeast of Bottchers Gap. The holes were hollowed out over many generations by Indians who used it to grind the acorns into flour. Much of the native Indian population had been forced into the Spanish mission system by about 1822, when most of the interior villages within the current Los Padres National Forest were uninhabited.

=== Homestead ===
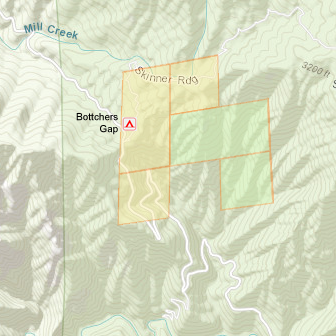
Map of two land patents granted to John Bottcher in 1888 and 1890, the namesake of Bottchers Gap

The camp is named for former homesteader John Gottfried Boettcher, a German immigrant who lived in a cabin on the site with his wife Pauline around 1885–1890. He obtained two patents, one in 1888 for 160 acres (65 ha), and a second in 1890 for 120 acres (49 ha). Skinner Ridge and Skinner Creek are named for Benjamin R. Skinner, who homesteaded the land with his wife Adeline and obtained a patent in 1890 to 160 acres northwest of Bottcher's land. Turner Creek, north of Skinner's homestead, was homesteaded by George C. Turner in 1890. After filing a patent for a homestead, the settler had complete ownership after residing on the property for five years or after six months with payment of $1.50 per acre.

=== Guard Station ===
The Palo Colorado Road ended at that time at a location locally known as the Hoist. The name came about because of the very steep road which during the turn of the century required wagon-loads of tanbark and lumber to be hoisted by block and tackle hitched to oxen. The old block and tackle is still chained to a massive log beam, now used to support mailboxes and labeled "The Hoist". The council contacted nearby Fort Ord and contracted with the United States Army Corps of Engineers to extend the road 3.4 miles (5.5 km) to Bottchers Gap and an additional 3.3 miles (5.3 km) to the North Fork of the Little Sur River and future site of Camp Pico Blanco. The Monterey Boy Scout Council spent about $200,000 (or about $3,750,000 today) to extend the road to Bottchers Gap and into the camp area. The road to the Boy Scout camp traverses extremely steep terrain, necessitating four narrow switchbacks. The entire road into the central camp area was completed in the summer of 1951.

The USFS Bottchers Gap Guard Station was built in 1950 along with the Double Cone Trail. The Bottchers Gap Forest Patrolman took supplies twice monthly by pack mules to the forest fire lookout on the Ventana Double Cone during the summer wildfire season. The patrolman and the mule train usually spent one night of the trip at the old Comings Cabin.

== Geology ==
Bottcher's Gap sits in a notch between Mescal Ridge and Skinner Ridge formed by the Palo Colorado fault where it crosses the ridge. The east side of the fault in the gap is primarily an upthrown block of quartz diorite, while the west side of the fault is composed mostly of metamorphic rocks including schist and gneiss. The fault-formed North Fork of the Little Sur River is located to the southeast, and the river flows along the fault for about 1 mile (1.6 km) before turning west towards the coast.

== Closure ==
The campground was closed when the Soberanes Fire was started by campers who left a fire untended on July 22, 2016. The fire burned through Palo Colorado Canyon in less than two days, destroying 57 homes and 11 outbuildings in the Garrapata and Palo Colorado Canyon areas. The following winter Rocky Creek washed out the road, and additional slides and slip-outs closed the road. Monterey County states that it does not have the funds to repair the road.
