= Chesebro Smith House =

Historic house in North Dakota, United States

- Formerly listed on the U.S. National Register of Historic Places
- Location: 1337 Broadway, Fargo, North Dakota
- Area: less than one acre
- Built: c.1909-1910
- Architectural style: Colonial Revival, Dutch Colonial Revival, Other
- MPS: North Side Fargo MRA
- NRHP reference No.: 86003744
- Removed from NRHP: September 23, 2004

The Chesebro Smith House on Broadway in Fargo, North Dakota was built in 1909. It was listed on the National Register of Historic Places. But it was delisted from the Register in 2004.

The house was "an outstanding example of a large Dutch Colonial Revival dwelling."

Properties delisted from the Register usually have had a building demolished or other severe loss of historic integrity.
