= Cheeseborough =

Cheeseborough may refer to:

== People ==
- Chandra Cheeseborough (born 1959), American track and field athlete
- Barbara Cheeseborough (1946–2013), American fashion model

== Places ==
- Cheeseborough, Queensland, Australia
- Cheeseborough, a community of Leeds and the Thousand Islands, Ontario, Canada

== See also ==
- Cheseborough (disambiguation)
- Chesebrough (disambiguation)
- Cheesebrough (disambiguation)
