= Silicon Valley Monterey Bay Council =

Boy Scouts of America council

Silicon Valley Monterey Bay Council #055
- Council shoulder patch
- Owner: Boy Scouts of America
- Headquarters: San Jose, California
- Location: Santa Clara County, Santa Cruz County, San Benito County, Monterey County
- Country: United States
- Coordinates: 37.341234837009566°N 121.9228357035333°W
- Founded: August 20, 1920
- Founders: John Crummey, Robert Bentley, Jr., Archer Bowden
- Scout Executive: Mark McHaddon
- Website svmbc.org

Silicon Valley Monterey Bay Council (#055) is a Boy Scouts of America council headquartered in San Jose, California. It was the result of a council merger between the Santa Clara County Council and the Monterey Bay Area Council. In 2004, the previous two councils served over 11,000 youth in over 400 Boy Scout troops, Cub Scout packs, Venturing crews, and Explorer posts. In 2012, the Monterey Bay Area Council announced that after 89 years as a separate council, it had agreed to merge back into the Santa Clara County Council. As of 2013, the council served 13,000 youth in four different counties.

== Organization ==
The council is divided into districts:

- Coyote Creek - Serves the City of Milpitas South into East San Jose in the communities of Alum Rock, Berryessa, Evergreen, Silver Creek, West to Monterey Highway including a good portion of downtown San Jose, including the neighborhoods of Naglee Park and Japan Town.
- Quicksilver - Serves the area of Gilroy, Morgan Hill, San Martin, Willow Glen, Blossom Valley, Almaden Valley, East and South San Jose.
- Pioneer - serves the communities of North San Jose, Santa Clara, Western San Jose, Campbell, Los Gatos, Monte Sereno and Redwood Estates.
- Polaris - serves the communities of Sunnyvale, Cupertino, and Saratoga.
- Loma Prieta - Santa Cruz County, plus Royal Oaks and Aromas
- San Benito - San Benito County, except Aromas
- Santa Lucia - Monterey County, except Royal Oaks

== History ==
The San Jose Council of the Boy Scouts of America was founded on August 20, 1920 by John Crummey (president of Bean Spray and Pump Company, later known as Food Machinery Corporation), Robert Bentley, Jr. (president of Muirson Label Company) and Archer Bowden (San Jose attorney). Bentley served as the first council president, Julius Rainwater was the first scout executive, and Edmund Richmond was the first council commissioner.

In 1922, the council changed its name to Santa Clara County Council, and took over administration for all of Santa Clara County. The council was incorporated in 1923, and oversight of San Benito County was added the same year. Monterey and Santa Cruz counties were added in 1927.

In 1933 San Benito, Santa Cruz and Monterey counties were split off to form the Monterey Bay Area Council. In 1939 the area around Palo Alto split off to form its own council, the now-defunct Stanford Area Council. That council, which had been one of the smaller BSA councils in the nation by area, merged with San Mateo County Council in the 1990s to form Pacific Skyline Council.

=== Monterey Bay Area Council ===
Monterey Bay Area Council (#025)
- Owner: Boy Scouts of America
- Headquarters: Salinas, California
- Country: United States
- Founded: 1933
- Defunct: 2012
- Website http://mbacbsa.org

The Monterey Bay Area Council was formed in 1933, when San Benito, Santa Cruz and Monterey counties were split off from the Santa Clara County Council. The council grew and was given the land for Camp Pico Blanco in 1948 by William Randolph Hearst. After the separation, they shared borders on two sides.

==== Council merger ====
The Santa Clara Council had successfully balanced its budget from 2002 to 2012 and had attracted new membership every month for nearly four years. It was recognized by the National Council of the Boy Scouts of America as a Centennial Quality Council every year from 2006 and 2010 and was a Gold level Journey to Excellence Council in 2011.

The Monterey Bay Area Council was on “conditional charters” during 2010 and 2011 and was given specific goals to balance its budget and increase its membership. The Council failed to reach those goals and in 2012 the national BSA gave the Monterey Bay Area Council a “transitional charter” and instructed it to seek a merger. In July 2012, the Monterey Bay Area Council announced it would be merging with the Santa Clara County Council. The announcement attributed the merger in large part to more than a million dollars in debt accumulated by the Monterey Bay Area Council. Expenses included the construction of a fish ladder and a new dining lodge at Camp Pico Blanco. The Monterey Bay Area Council had also experienced continuous declining enrollment. In early 2012, the existing council board asked the Santa Clara County Council to operate the council while the merger was underway.

The Santa Clara Council formed a committee to complete the merger and study which of the three camps it will continue to own—Camp Pico Blanco, Camp Hi-Sierra, and Chesebrough Scout Reservation. In September 2012, the combined councils announced that over 75 names had been suggested by volunteers for the new council, and that from among these names they had chosen Silicon Valley Monterey Bay Council as the combined council's name. The merger was finalized in December 2012.

== Council camps ==
The new council currently operates three camps and has operated several others in the past. As a result of the merger with the Monterey Bay Area Council, the Santa Clara Council studied which of the three camps it would continue to operate. As of 2022, it is operating Camp Hi-Sierra and Chesebrough Scout Reservation. Camp Pico Blanco was in operation until a road failure in 2017 forced the camp to close. The council put the camp on the market in April 2022.

=== Camp Hi-Sierra ===
Camp Hi-Sierra is located in the Sierra Nevada Mountain Range, minutes from the small town of Long Barn, California. This camp is at notably high altitude, with the majority of its buildings standing at approximately 4,800 feet (1,500 m) and the highest point of the mountain standing over a mile high at 5,300 feet (1,600 m). The camp is used year-round with six weeks of Scouting camp during the summer. In the past it has played host to International Rendezvous, and is hosting one in the summer of 2025. During the 'off season' Camp Hi-Sierra is used for training sessions as well as council activities.

==== History ====
Camp Hi-Sierra was created in 1949 with land that the Santa Clara County Council bought within the Stanislaus National Forest. Before the camp was a Scout Reservation though it was inhabited by the Miwok Indians. When logging scions discovered the forest, they decided to start logging in the spot where the camp is now located. To this day, as one walks through camp, they can still see remnants of the logging industry such as parts of the old mill. Small-scale logging continues along the main camp road.

The Silicon Valley Monterey Bay Council maintains the camp as well and a full-time ranger lives in the camp throughout the year. He is the caretaker for all of Camp Hi-Sierra.

==== Location ====
This camp is located within the Stanislaus National Forest. Its official postal address is in nearby Long Barn, California, although it is about one mile southeast of Cold Springs, California. The turn-off is about 30 miles East of Sonora and nearly one mile West of Cold Springs Market on State Route 108. The tourist town of Pinecrest, California and its popular Pinecrest Lake are approximately five miles further East on Hwy 108.

==== Facilities ====
Buildings at Camp Hi-Sierra include a staff bunkhouse, dining hall, office, and other structures. The camp is bisected by the North Fork of the Tuolumne River. On the western side is Staff Hill, home to the camp staff during the summertime. Also, this side contains the camp office, health lodge, dining hall, flag meadow, and the ranger's home. On the southernmost end of the camp property is a small seasonal man-made lake.

On the eastern side of camp is the Blackfoot Meadow, home to the baseball diamond. Directly across from Blackfoot Meadow is the archery range. Also near the meadow is the frisbee disc golf course. Further south is the high adventure area; this includes the bike barn and rock climbing tower. Across from the climbing wall (built in 2016) is the trading post, which was built in 2005. Next to the high adventure area is the Trail to Eagle area (also called Treagle) and beyond that the Scoutcraft area. Opposite from Scoutcraft is the "livery", home of the craft shop. Behind this is the Nature area, formerly the High-Adventure Base. The log cabin has now been converted into the nature cabin, with space on the second floor for storage and a workspace, formerly a sleeping area.

Across the path from the Nature area is Foxfire. On this fenced-in property, there is a tipi for Indian lore classes and a blacksmith shop with a coal forge and three anvils. This is home of the Mountain Man program, where scouts can learn blacksmithing, woodcarving, and tomahawk throwing.

The eastern side of the river contains all of the scout camps, where 250-350 scouts can be housed in tents. High on the hill are the shooting ranges and chapel.

=== Chesebrough Scout Reservation ===
Chesebrough Scout Reservation, also called Camp Chesebrough is a 544 acres (220 ha) Boy Scouts of America camp in the Santa Cruz Mountains of Santa Cruz and San Mateo counties, California. The camp is owned by the Memorial Foundation of the Santa Clara County Council, and is used year-round for troop campouts, Order of the Arrow events and Wood Badge trainings; and as a Cub Scouting day camp and a junior leadership resident camp during the summer.

==== History ====
The original 404 acres (163 ha) of Chesebrough Scout Reservation in Santa Cruz County were donated to the original Santa Clara County Council by Paul and Nessie Chesebrough in 1977. Paul had inherited the camp and much of the surrounding area from his aunt Edith Van Antwerp in 1949. The Chesebroughs felt that the land should remain open and available for use by the people of California, so they donated much of it to the Mid-Peninsula Regional Open Space District, the Sempervirens Fund, and of course, the Boy Scouts. The Chesebroughs donated another 140 acres (57 ha) adjoining the property in San Mateo County in 1983.

The council wanted to use Chesebrough as an undeveloped wilderness camp, but the closing of Camp Stuart in Saratoga in 1990 forced the council to move many of the activities from that camp to Chesebrough, including the Cub Scout day camp, which required the construction of additional facilities.

==== Location ====
Chesebrough Scout Reservation straddles the Santa Cruz-San Mateo county border, and is located 9 miles (14 km) south of Saratoga on California State Route 9, and 2 miles (3.2 km) south of that road's intersection with California State Route 35, or Skyline Boulevard at Saratoga Gap. The Skyline-to-the-Sea Trail passes through the camp about 5 miles (8.0 km) from its Skyline terminus, in Castle Rock State Park.

The camp is bordered by Saratoga Gap Open Space Preserve and Long Ridge Open Space Preserves of the Mid-Peninsula Regional Open Space District, and Castle Rock and Portola State Parks.

==== Facilities ====
Chesebrough Scout Reservation has about 8 campsites, each capable of holding at least 30 campers. In addition, the camp has a large modern kitchen, a 300-seat campfire amphitheater, BB gun and archery ranges, and 32 miles (51 km) of hiking trails. The trails connect to the Skyline-to-the-Sea Trail, giving access to Castle Rock State Park, Big Basin Redwoods State Park, and Cutter Scout Reservation.

=== Camp Pico Blanco ===
Camp Pico Blanco is an inactive camp of 368 acres (149 ha) (originally 1,445 acres (585 ha)) in the interior region of Big Sur in Central California. The camp is surrounded by the Los Padres National Forest, the Ventana Wilderness, undeveloped private land owned by Graniterock, and is located near the Little Sur River.

=== Former camps ===
- Alum Rock Park (1921 – unknown). The council was given exclusive access to 15 acres (6.1 ha) in the park.
- Camp Swanton (1924 – 1930)
- Camp Arroyo Sequoia (1931 – 1944, 1948)
- Camp Bonnie Brier (early 1940s), now known as Boulder Creek Scout Reservation and operated by Pacific Skyline Council
- San Lorenzo Scout Ranch (1941 – 1948)
- Camp Totocano, near Swanton, California (1927 – 1934)
- Camp Wing, at Big Sur State Park (1937)
- Camp Esselen, at Big Sur State Park (1938 – 1953)
- Fort Ord Scout Camp

==== Camp Stuart ====
Camp Stuart (formally, the Stuart Scout Training Reservation), founded in 1944, is a defunct camp in Saratoga, California. It was donated by Mr. and Mrs. R. R. Stuart, and named in memory of their son, Reginald Ross Stuart. The camp contains 144 acres (58 ha), and is located near Sanborn-Skyline County Park.

The camp had a pool, dining room, multipurpose building, flush toilets, shower building, meeting lodge and many campsites. Bohlman Road, which was paved in the 1950s, divides the camp in two. One side served as a Cub Scout day camp, one of the largest in the United States, serving nearly 3000 Scouts each year.

Camp Stuart's last summer of operation was in 1988. The Santa Clara County Council already owned two other camps, and decided to sell Camp Stuart to take advantage of rising land values. The camp was sold in 1989, shortly before several buildings were damaged in the Loma Prieta earthquake. The county has not demolished or developed the camp, and has no funds or apparent plans for the area.

== Order of the Arrow ==
As a result of the merger, the two former council's OA chapters have merged from the former Santa Clara County Council's Miwok Lodge and the Monterey Bay Area Council's Esselen Lodge into the new Saklan Lodge.

== See also ==
- Scouting in California
