= Go-devil =

One-horse sled for hauling logged trees

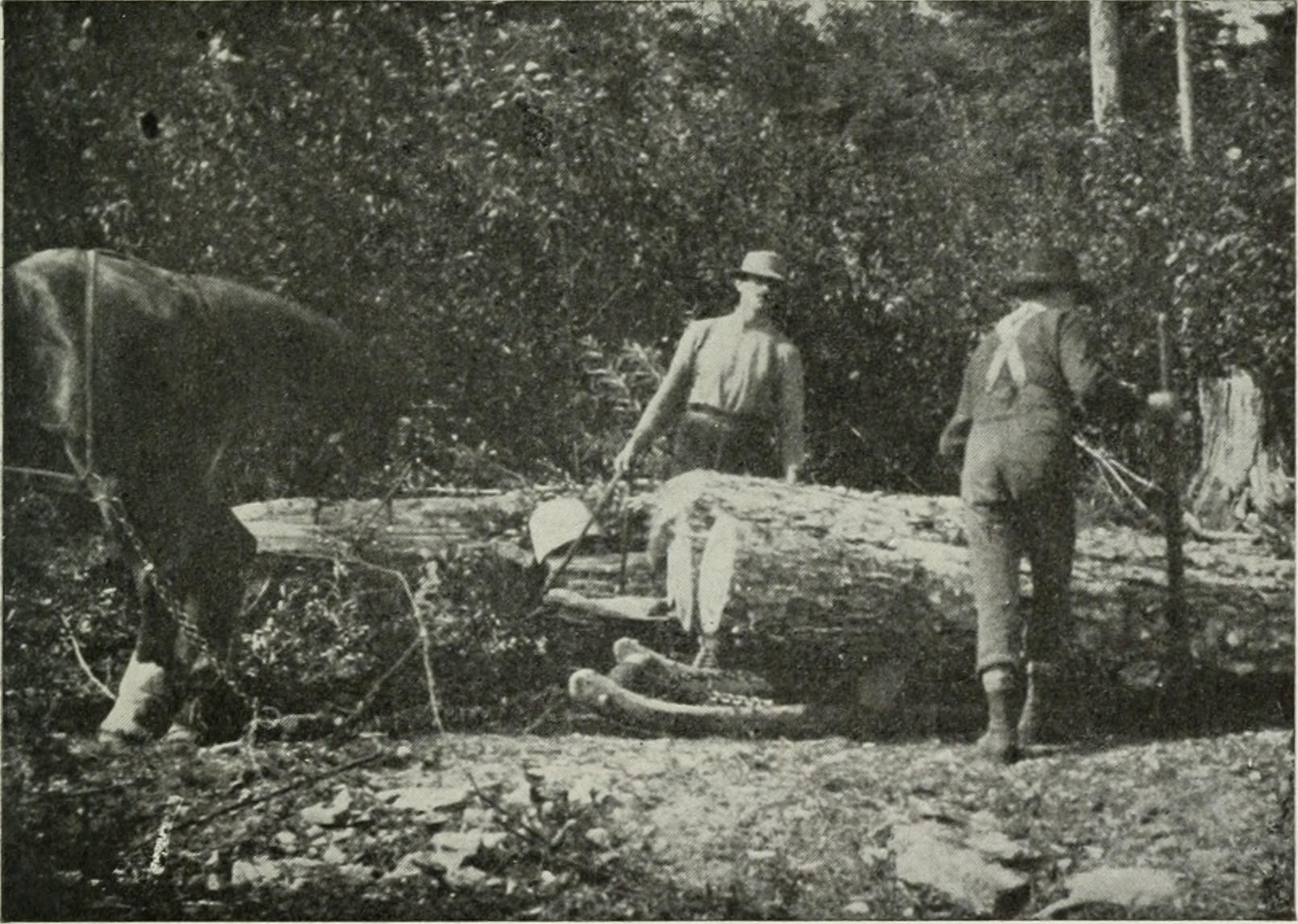
A go-devil loaded with hardwood logs

The go-devil was a simple one-horse sled used for hauling trees in logging. Ralph C. Bryant describes it in his pioneering textbook Logging (1913) as follows:

The go-devil is a product of the camp blacksmith shop. It is a rough sled having two unshod hardwood runners, which are preferably of yellow birch, selected from timbers having a natural crook. The usual type of runner is from 6 to 7.5 feet long, 6 inches wide, and from 3 to 5 inches thick. A 6-inch by 6-inch by 4-foot or 5-foot bunk is fastened to each runner by a bolt. The bunk is placed from 2 to 2.5 feet from the rear end of the runners. A ring is attached to the center of this bunk and the logs are bound on the latter by a chain passing around the logs and bunk and through the ring. The curved, forward ends of the runners are connected by a roller which has a short chain at each end that passes through a hole in the forward end of the runner and is fastened several inches back on it.
Since the go-devil has no tongue it can be turned around in a small space. The draft rigging consists of chains fastened to either side of the bunk or to the runners. The chains are brought forward and joined directly in front of the roller by a ring to which the hook on the double-tree is attached.

Since go-devils are loosely constructed, there is considerable backward and forward play in the runners and if one of them becomes obstructed the other moves ahead and starts it.

Go-devils are seldom used for distances less than 300 feet, except under adverse snaking conditions. They may be used for a quarter of a mile on snow but are not as economical as larger sleds for this distance. Trails are required and these are cut by the swampers as they prepare the logs for skidding.
