= Edith Chesebrough Van Antwerp =

American amateur golfer (1881–1949)

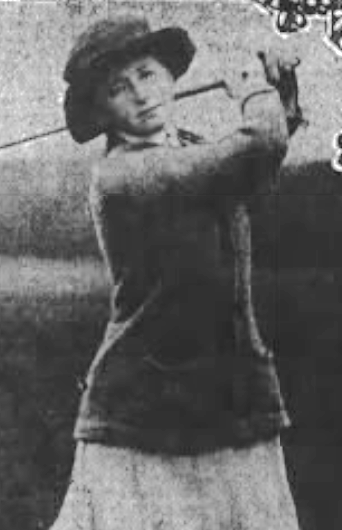
- Born: Edith Saunders Chesebrough; September 12, 1881; San Francisco, California, U.S.
- Died: September 8, 1949 (aged 67); Burlingame, California, U.S.
- Occupations: Golfer, socialite

Edith Saunders Chesebrough Van Antwerp (September 12, 1881 – September 8, 1949) was an American amateur golfer. She won the NCGA Women's Amateur Championship six times, in 1911, 1912, 1916, 1918, 1920, and 1923. She was California state champion and West Coast champion in 1911.

== Early life ==
Chesebrough was born in San Francisco, the daughter of Andronicus Chesebrough and Edith Saunders Chesebrough. Her father was prominent in shipping.

== Career ==
Chesebrough was a competitive amateur golfer in California. She was captain of the Women's Annex of the San Francisco Golf and Country Club. She won the Del Monte Cup at Pebble Beach in 1903 and 1908. She won the Northern California Women's Amateur Championship six times, in 1911, 1912, 1916, 1918, 1920, and 1923. She did not compete for the title in 1913. In 1911, she was named California state champion and West Coast women's golf champion. She was named San Francisco champion in 1919.

"Besides being a golf champion, Miss Chesebrough has attained distinction as a horsewoman, and excels in swimming and tennis", noted Anna de Koven in Good Housekeeping magazine in 1912. "Miss Edith Chesebrough has been winning championships so consistently in the past five years that nobody was surprised to hear that she had regained the title of California champion from Miss Alice Warner", reported Spalding's Official Golf Guide in 1915.

== Personal life and legacy ==
Chesebrough married stockbroker and World War I veteran William Clarkson Van Antwerp in 1922. Their mansion in Burlingame, Danvers House, was designed by Bakewell and Brown. Her husband died in 1938, and she died in 1949, at Mills Memorial Hospital, at the age of 67. Her sister Helen Percy Chesebrough was head of the San Mateo County Red Cross; she also died in 1949. Some of the land she left to her nephew Paul became the Chesebrough Scout Reservation in Santa Cruz County.
