= Marble Cone Fire =

1977 wildfire in Central California

Coordinates: 36.2268°N 121.5763°W

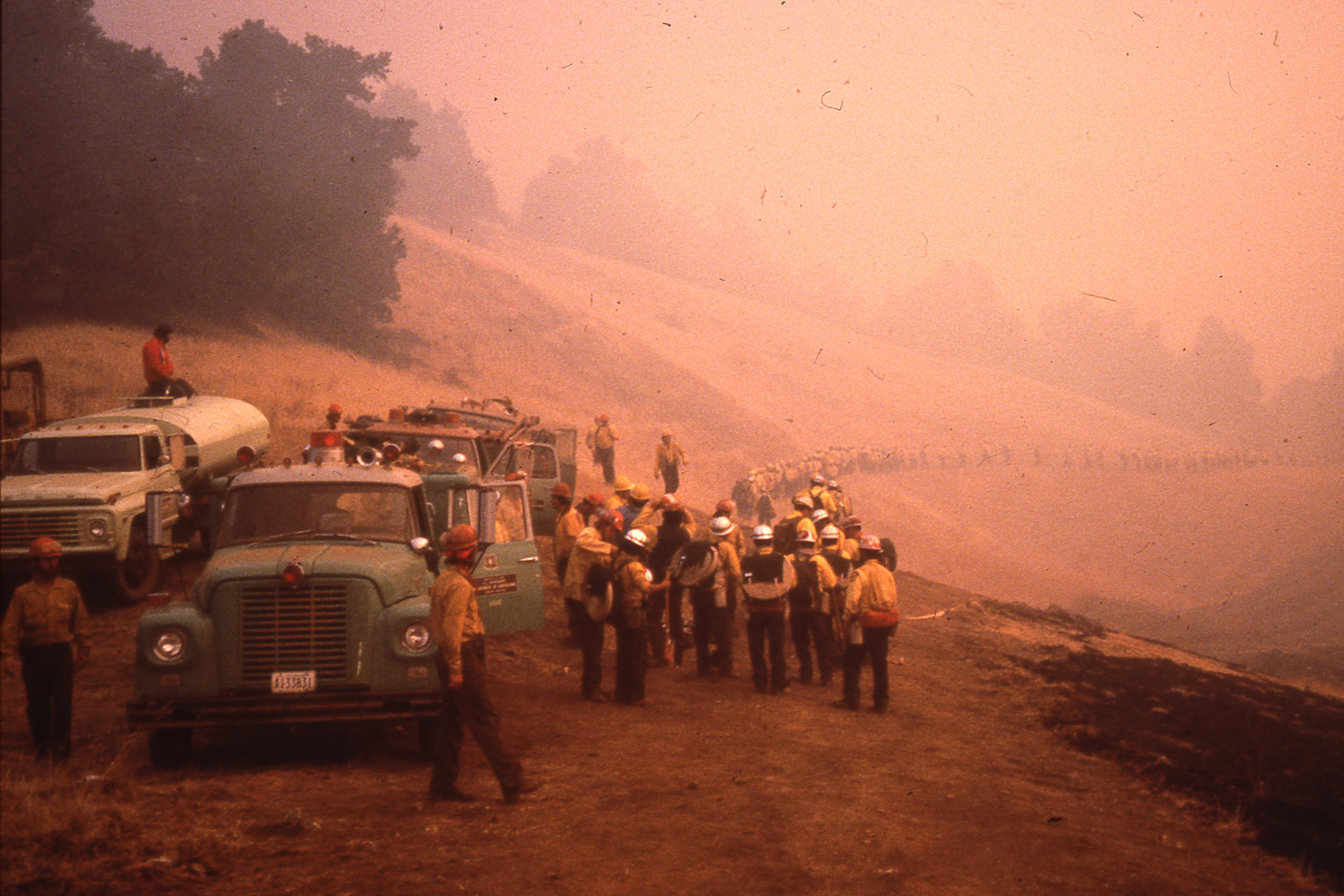
- Firefighters assemble preparing to attack the fire.
- Date: August 1977
- Location: Big Sur, California

Statistics
- Burned area: 177,866 acres (71,980 ha; 278 sq mi; 720 km^{2})
- Land use: Wildlands

Impacts
- Deaths: 0

Ignition
- Cause: Lightning

The Marble Cone Fire was a wildland fire that burned for three weeks in August 1977 in the Santa Lucia Mountains high country of the Big Sur area of Monterey County, California including the Ventana Wilderness. Started by two lightning strikes, the fire burned 177,866 acres (720 km^{2}) in the Santa Lucia Mountains, making it the largest wildfire in the state since the Matilija Fire of 1932, although as of 2024 it no longer ranks in the top twenty.

About 5,700 firefighters cut 160 miles (260 km) of line around the fire before it was contained. The fire burned 90% of the vegetation cover in the upper Big Sur River watershed. This posed a threat of flooding along the Big Sur River as a much smaller fire in August 1972 had led to severe flooding. This time, however, the rains were moderate and resulted in no major flooding problems. The fire cost $10.65 million to contain and caused millions of dollars more in damage to the watersheds of the Carmel River Valley, Arroyo Seco River, Big Sur, Little Sur River and Big Creek.

== Criticism ==
Big Sur residents and members of the Big Sur Fire Brigade were severely critical of the fire management efforts of Los Padres National Forest supervisor Al West. The local volunteer fire brigade acted quickly as soon as the fire was discovered. The well-trained and equipped department responded with 16 volunteers, a bulldozer, two fire engines, and two pickups carrying pumps and water. They were the first units on scene at about 6pm on the Coast Ridge Road, but West refused to allow them to attack the fire.

The Big Sur Fire Brigade claimed that hundreds of firefighters and dozens of engines, tankers and bulldozers were brought in from surrounding states, but much of the equipment and personnel were parked along Highway 1, unused for almost two weeks. West refused to allow bulldozers on the fire lines for 10 days, despite the fact that they are permitted in wilderness areas during emergencies.

When fire boss Myron Lee acted, he deployed firefighters in a wide encirclement, concentrating on the northern side, choosing to focus on protecting the Carmel River watershed while allowing 80,000 to 85,000 acres of the 98,000-acre Ventana Wilderness to burn. On the southern perimeter, he established firelines far from the fire and ordered backfires that consumed as much land as the fire itself. Fire lines in the south were thinly manned and far from the actual fire, allowing the fire free rein in a large section of the wilderness.

Big Sur Fire Brigade members later learned that USFS policy at the time was to replace used or damaged equipment and replenish firefighting budgets only when the costs exceeded $10 million. Gary Koeppel, foreman of the Fire Brigade, wrote, "Many people at the time suspected that the Marble-Cone fire was allowed to burn until its cost reached that magic million-dollar number."
