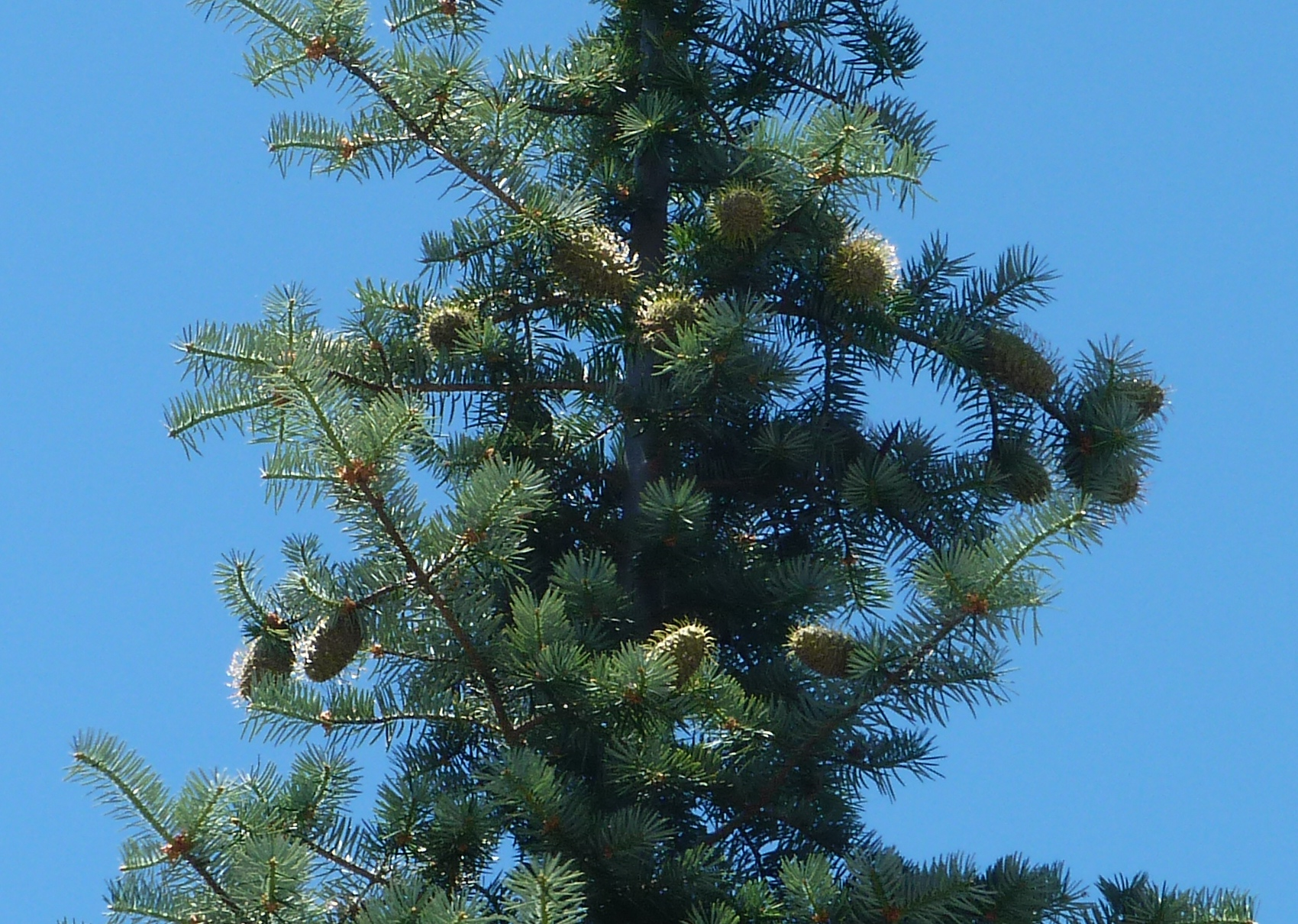

Conservation status
- Near Threatened (IUCN 3.1)

- Imperiled (NatureServe)

Scientific classification
- Kingdom: Plantae
- Clade: Embryophytes
- Clade: Tracheophytes
- Clade: Spermatophytes
- Clade: Gymnospermae
- Division: Pinophyta
- Class: Pinopsida
- Order: Pinales
- Family: Pinaceae
- Genus: Abies
- Section: Abies sect. Bracteata
- Species: A. bracteata

Binomial name
- Abies bracteata (D. Don) A. Poit.
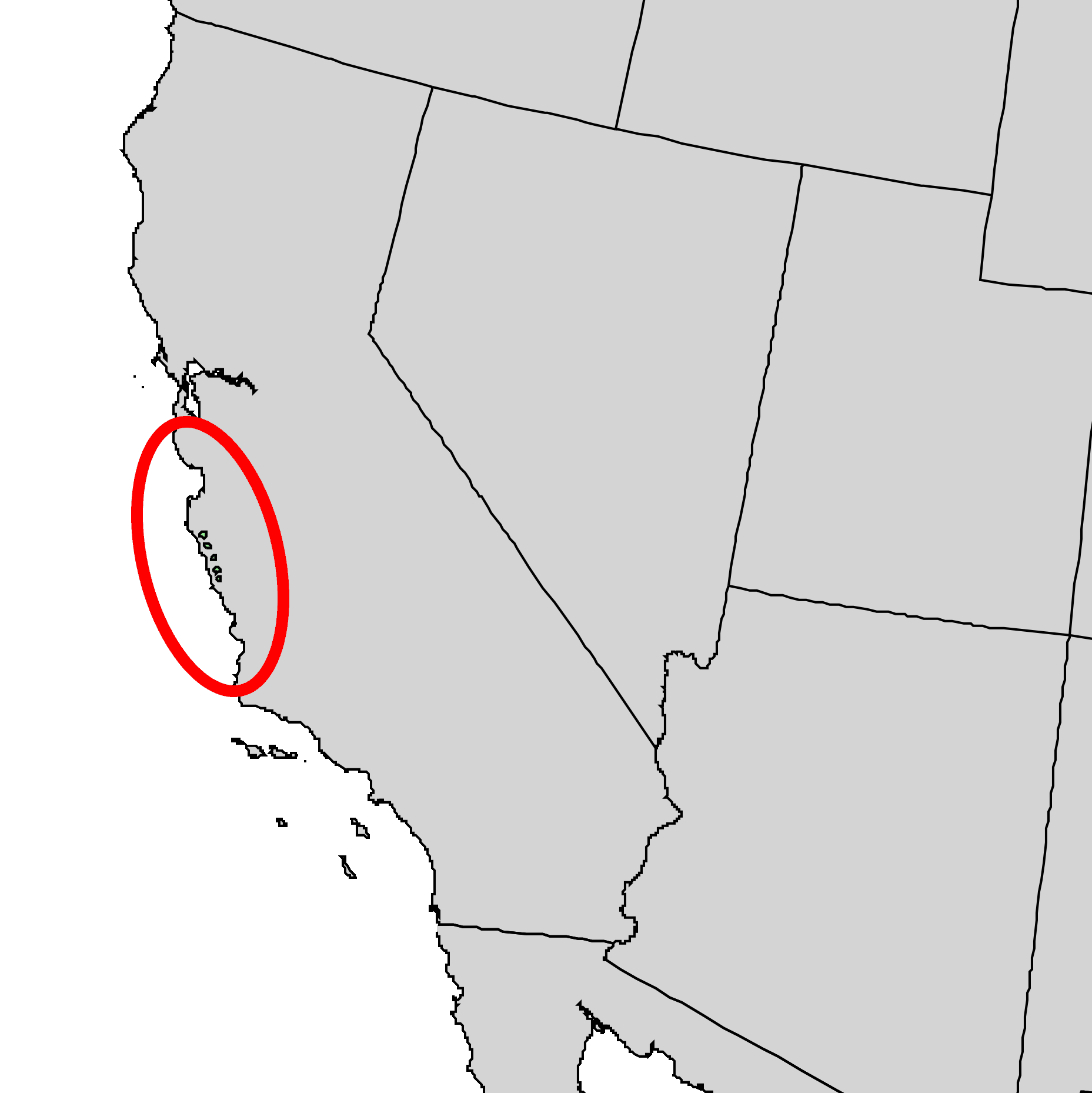
- Abies bracteata native range
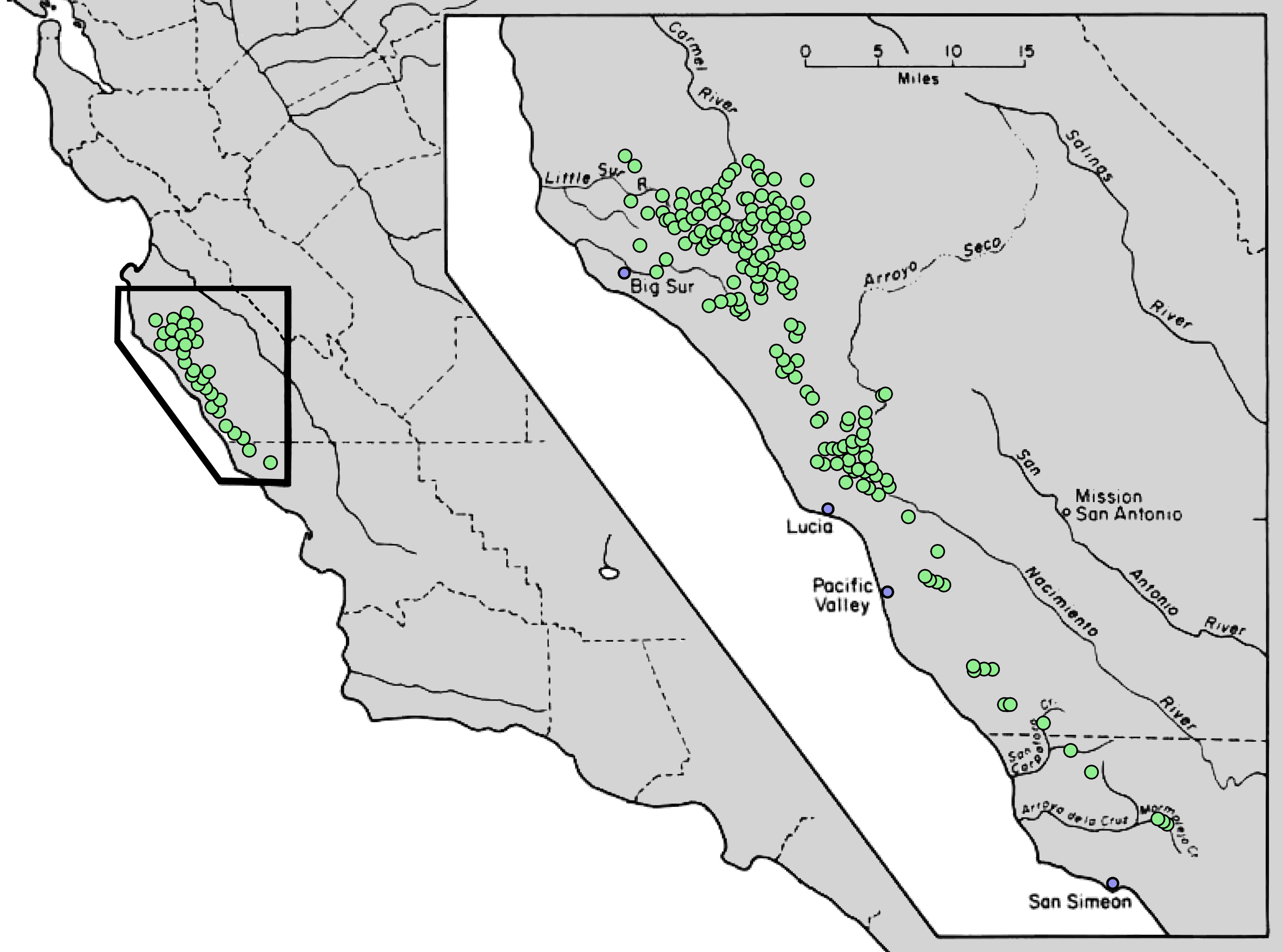
- Close-up of natural range of Abies bracteata

= Abies bracteata =

Species of conifer

Abies bracteata, the Santa Lucia fir or bristlecone fir, is the rarest fir in North America. It is confined to steep-sided slopes and the bottoms of rocky canyons in the Santa Lucia Mountains, in the Big Sur region on the central coast of California, United States.

== Location ==
The species may have had a broader range in the Ice Age era, rendering it a possible paleoendemic, although some scientists say no fossil evidence of the tree has been conclusively identified. The tree is now confined, possibly due to long-term climatic changes, to a few, small locales that mimic those of the distant past.

=== Fire susceptibility ===
The fir tends to be concentrated in steep, rocky, fire-resistant spots at elevations from 2,000 to 5,000 feet (610 to 1,520 m). Due to the tree's thin bark, it is susceptible to fire, and large stands are always located near high cliffs or in steep, rugged canyons that prevent litter accumulation under the tree canopy and limit the strength of fires.

=== Known stands ===
The fir currently grows in a few scattered areas within the Santa Lucia Mountains along the Pacific Slope of California. Four concentrations are found in the vicinity of the Ventana Double Cone and Kandlbinder Peaks, Junipero Serra Peak, Cone Peak, and on the Monterey / San Luis Obispo County line, along San Carpóforo Creek within the Hearst Ranch. The most inland stand, 13 miles (21 km) from the Pacific Coast, was found in Anastasia Canyon in the vicinity of the Arroyo Seco River and Tassajara Hot Springs.

Most stands are found on north- and northeast-facing slopes. Trees are rarely found under 1,700 feet (520 m) elevation. When found at lower elevations, they are always located at the bottom of a large canyon, where cold air drainage enables it to thrive. The lowest stand is found at an elevation of 600 to 900 feet (180 to 270 m) near Ventana Camp on the Big Sur River. This camp is at the bottom of a 300-foot (91 m)-deep canyon, in the redwood belt, and is frequently foggy.

The northernmost tree was located in 1927 at 750 feet (230 m) elevation on Skinners Ridge to the east of the North Fork of the Little Sur River, but it's not known if it survived subsequent fires.

=== First identified ===
The first known specimen was collected in 1831 or 1832 by either botanists Thomas Coulter or David Douglas. They likely collected specimens from Cone Peak to the west of Mission San Antonio. Both sent specimens to England, but Coulter's specimen was first identified as bracteata and the name given his species has become the common use.

=== Cultivation ===
The tree is a popular ornamental and is found in many arboreta. It grows in an equable Mediterranean climate with considerable precipitation during the winter and very dry summers. No one has been able to introduce it successfully in the eastern United States, but numerous groves thrive in Europe.

== Description ==
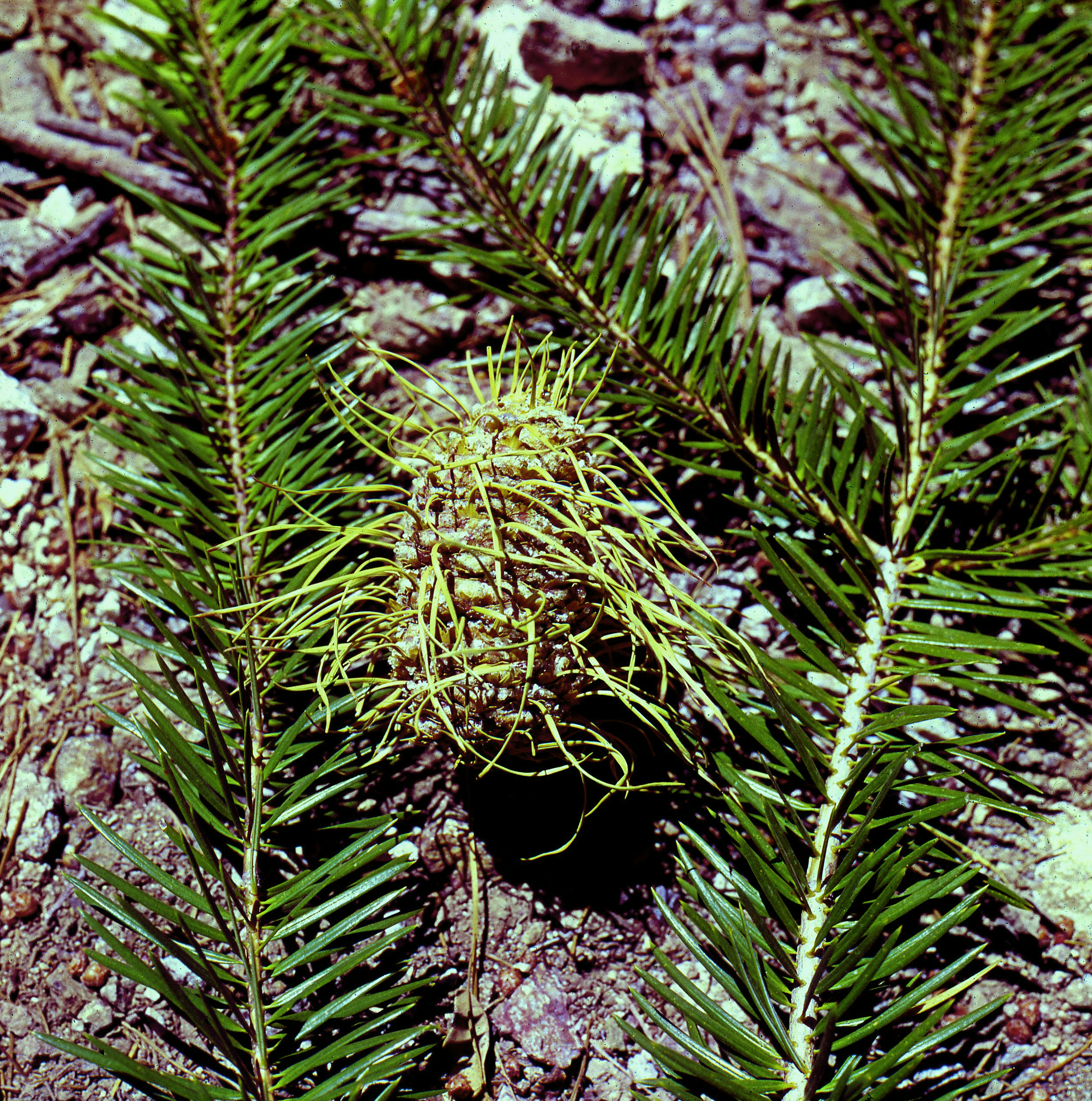
a close-up view of a cone from the species

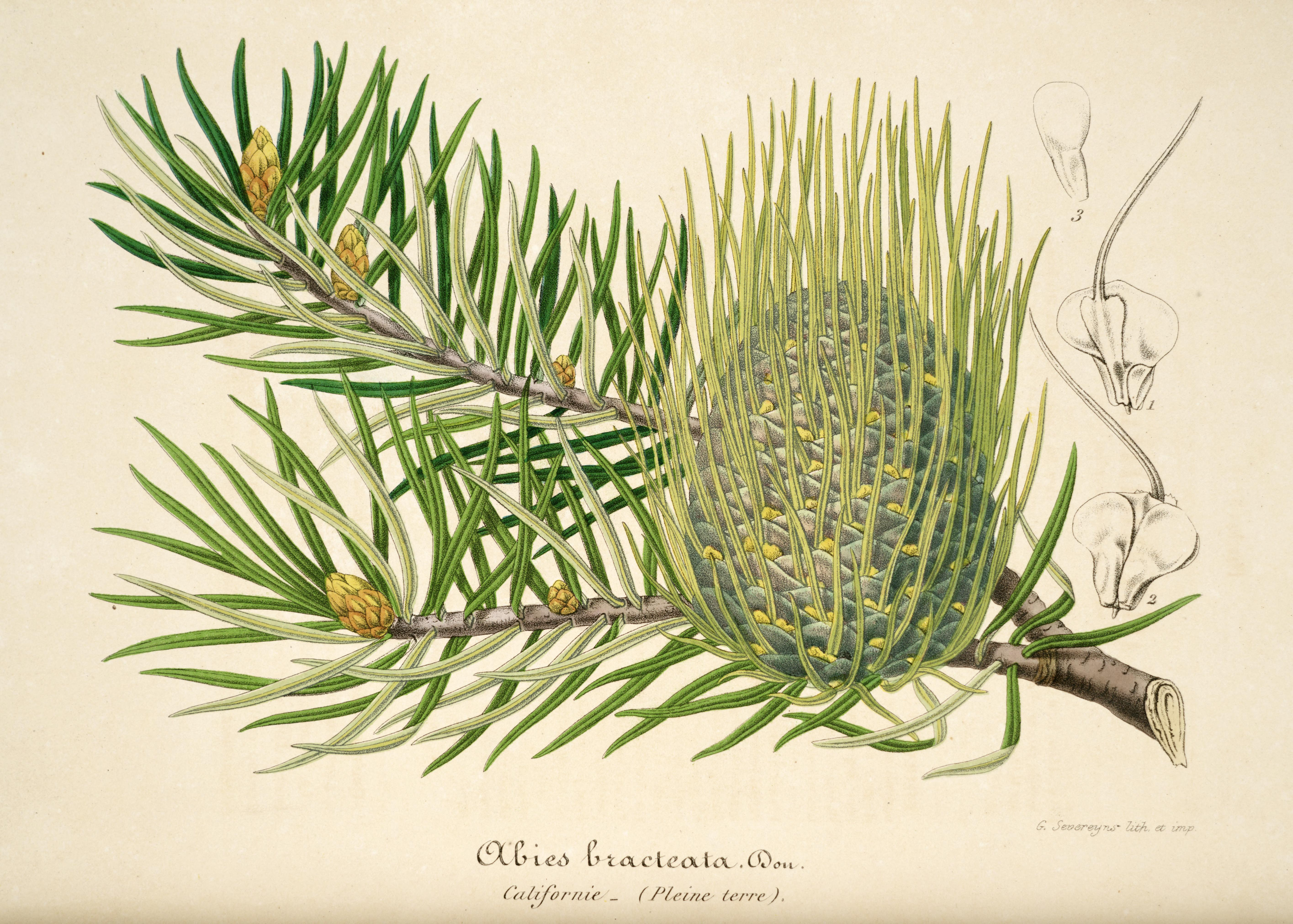
Illustration of this species

The 66 to 115 feet (20 to 35 m) tall tree, has a slender, spire-like form. The thin bark is reddish-brown with wrinkles, lines and resin vesicles ('blisters'). The branches are downswept. The needle-like leaves are arranged spirally on the shoot, but twisted at the base to spread either side of the shoot in two moderately forward-pointing ranks with a 'v' gap above the shoot. The leaves are hard and stiff with a sharply pointed tip, 3.5–6 cm long and 2.5–3 mm broad, with two bright white stomatal bands on the underside. The flowers bloom in early May, and the ovoid, 6–9 cm long (to 12 cm including the bracts) cones mature and release winged seeds from late August to October. The cones differ from other firs in that the bracts end in very long, spreading, yellow-brown bristles 3–5 cm long. The male (pollen) cones are 2 cm long, shedding pollen in spring.

The tallest and widest known living tree was last measured at 38.7 metres (127 ft) in height with a DBH of 121 centimetres (48 in), but the tallest and widest specimen ever recorded was 55.5 metres (182 ft) tall with a DBH of 131 centimetres (52 in).

== Historical uses ==
Resin from the trunk was used as an incense by the early Spanish mission.
