= Double cone =

Double cone may refer to:

- Double cone (geometry)
- Double cone (biology)
- The Remarkables Mountain range, in New Zealand
- Ventana Double Cone, a mountain in the Santa Lucia Range of California
