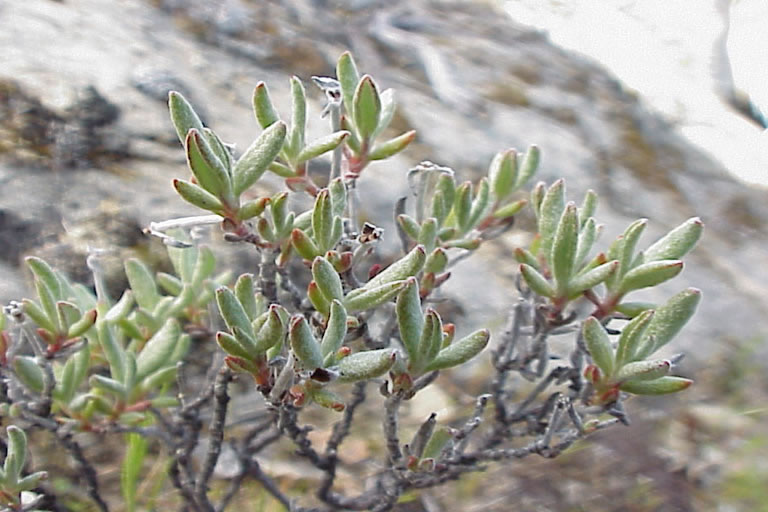

Conservation status
- Imperiled (NatureServe)

Scientific classification
- Kingdom: Plantae
- Clade: Embryophytes
- Clade: Tracheophytes
- Clade: Angiosperms
- Clade: Eudicots
- Order: Caryophyllales
- Family: Polygonaceae
- Genus: Eriogonum
- Species: E. butterworthianum

Binomial name
- Eriogonum butterworthianum J.T.Howell

= Eriogonum butterworthianum =

Species of wild buckwheat

Eriogonum butterworthianum is a rare species of wild buckwheat known by the common name Butterworth's buckwheat. It is endemic to the Santa Lucia Mountains of central Monterey County, California, where it is known from a few occurrences in the wilderness southeast of Big Sur in the vicinity of Junipero Serra Peak. Its native habitats include oak and conifer woodlands, chaparral communities, and sandstone outcrops. Eriogonum butterworthianum is a small clumpy shrub or subshrub that grows up to about 30 centimeters tall and wide. Leaves are 2 centimeters long and reddish-green in color. They are woolly, oval in shape, and curled under at the edges. The inflorescence is a cluster of flowers up to 2 or 3 centimeters wide. Each individual flower is a few millimeters wide and dull yellowish to pinkish in color. Flowers bloom June to September.

== Taxonomy ==
Eriogonum butterworthianum was scientifically described by John Thomas Howell in 1961, placing it in the Eriogonum genus. It is classified in the Polygonaceae and the species has no botanical synonyms.
