= Cone Peak =

Mountain in California, United States

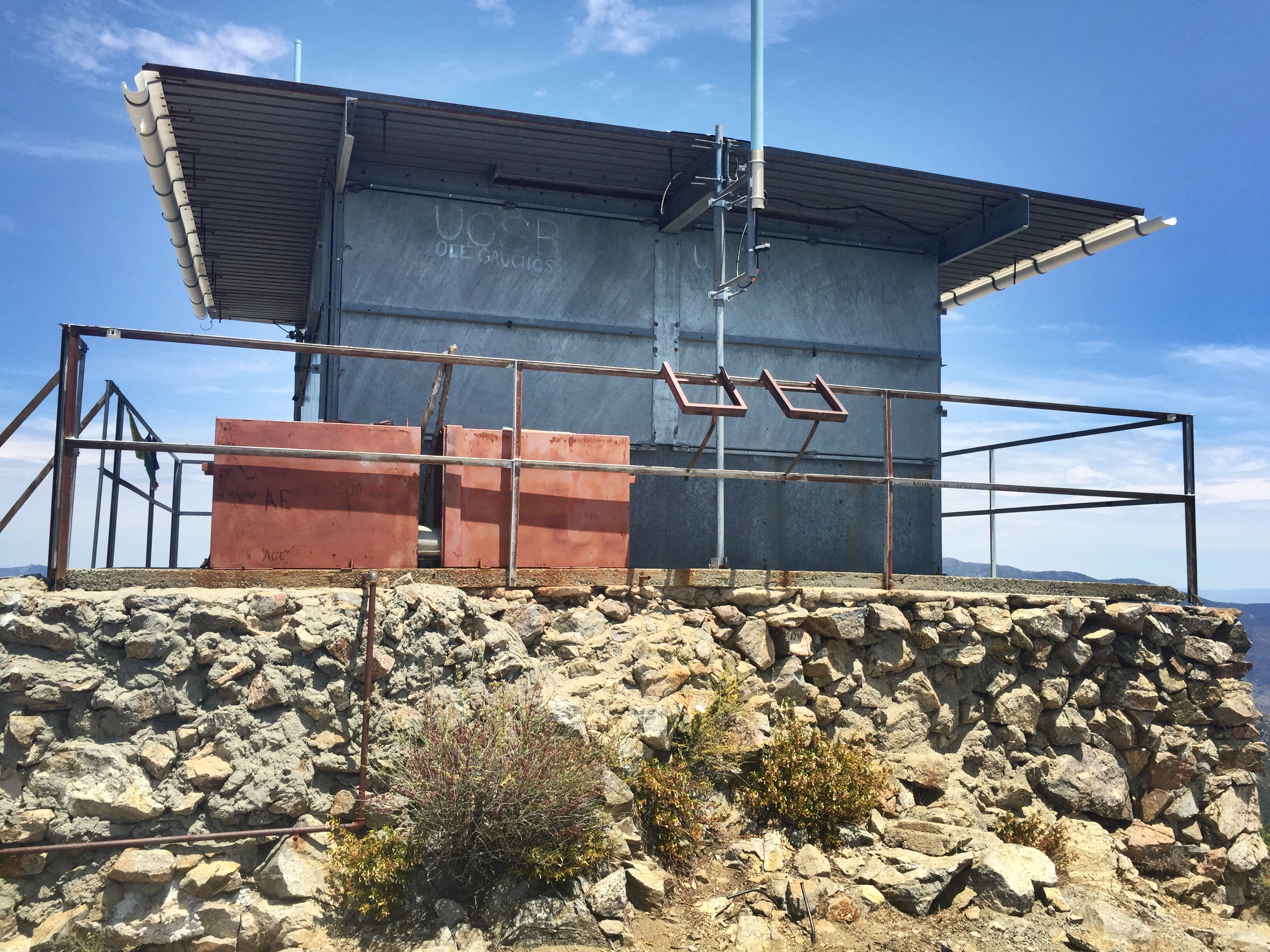
- Decommissioned forest fire lookout on Cone Peak

Highest point
- Elevation: 5,155 ft (1,571 m) NAVD 88
- Prominence: 2,915 ft (888 m)
- Coordinates: 36°03′07″N 121°29′46″W

Geography
- Location within California
- Location: Monterey County, California, U.S.
- Parent range: Santa Lucia Mountains
- Topo map: USGS Cone Peak

Climbing
- Easiest route: Road and trail hike

Cone Peak (indigenous name: Ts’owém) is the second highest mountain in the Santa Lucia Range in the Ventana Wilderness of the Los Padres National Forest. It rises nearly a vertical mile only 3 miles (4.8 km) from the coast as the crow flies. This is one of the steepest gradients from ocean to summit in the contiguous United States. The average gradient from sea level to summit is around 33%, which is steeper than the average gradient from Owens Valley to the summit of Mount Whitney. Near the mountain summit, the oak woodland and chaparral transitions to a pine forest with a few rare Santa Lucia Firs. Junipero Serra Peak at 5,865 feet (1,788 m) is the highest peak in the coastal region.

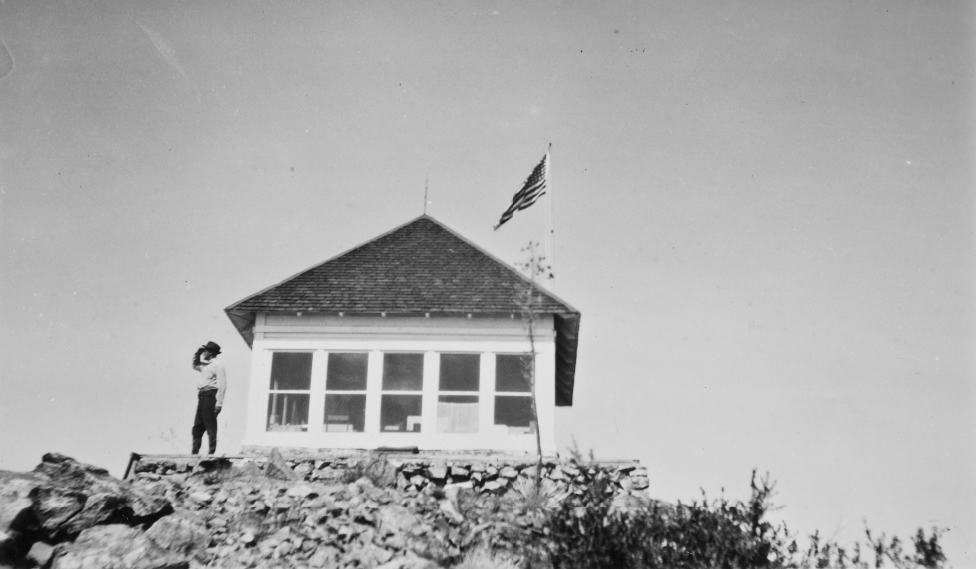
Arthur Stone at the Cone Peak Lookout, 1928

The peak is accessible by driving the Nacimiento-Fergusson Road and then hiking north 6 miles (9.7 km) on Forest Route 22S05. The very rough Coast Ridge Road rises to 3,800 feet (1,200 m). The peak is a popular hiking destination. From that point the summit is 2.25 miles (3.62 km) hike along the Cone Peak Trail (4E12). There are two trails from the coast to the summit of Cone Peak: via the Stone Ridge/Gamboa Trail or the Vicente Flat Trail.

The peak is topped by the decommissioned Cone Peak Lookout built in 1923. The original 13 by 13 feet (4.0 by 4.0 m) wooden-sided ground-level cab house was built on a rock foundation. It originally had a hipped "dunce cap" roof, and was called a "California Lookout" design. The building was hauled in pieces by mules up the steep and narrow 2 miles (3.2 km) trail. During World War II, it was the site of an Aircraft Warning Service observation post.

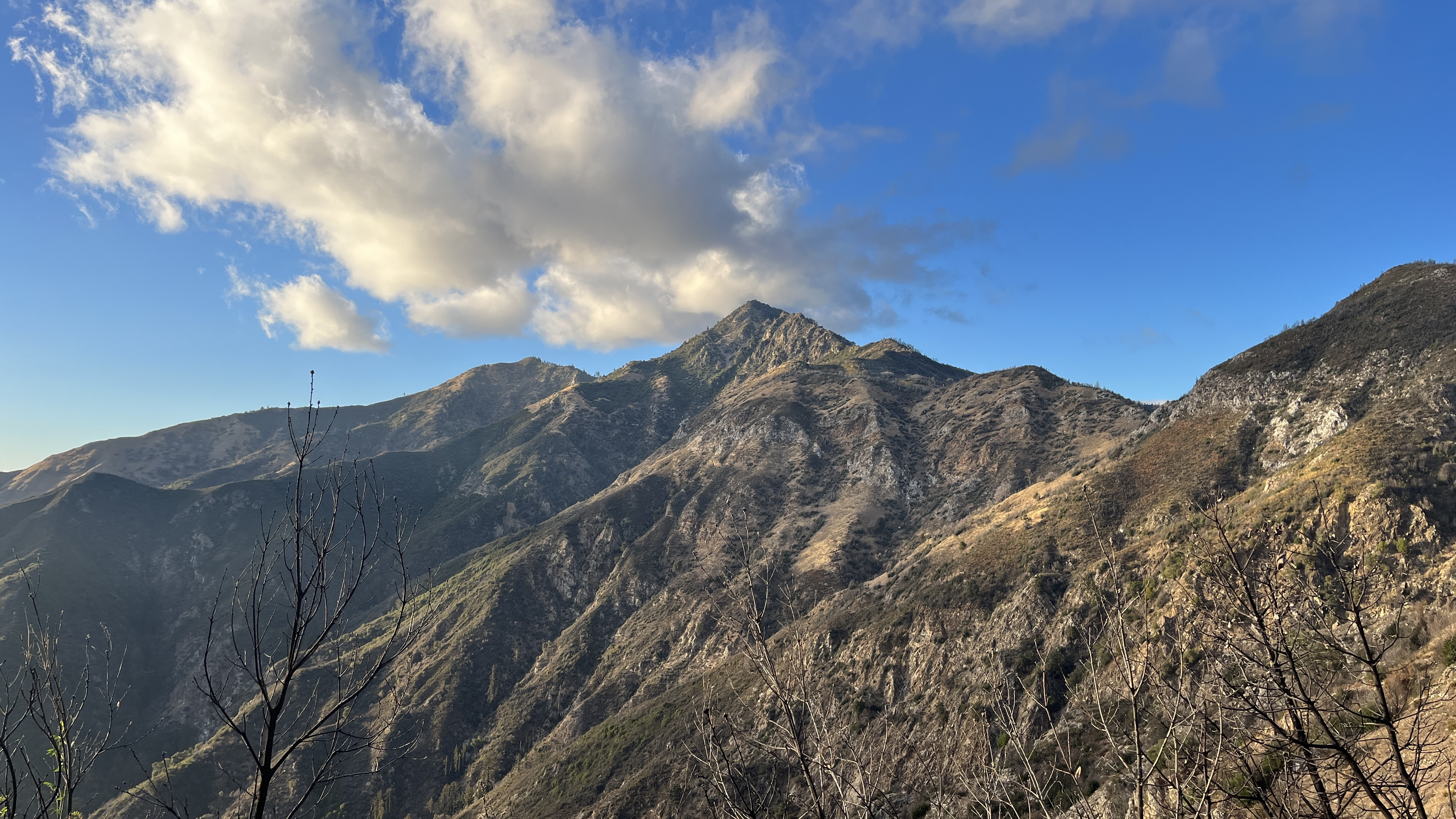
Cone Peak (center) is visible from the Vicente Flat Trail

In 1959. the U.S. Forest Service replaced the hipped roof with a flat roof that could be used to land a Bell-47 helicopter. The wood siding was replaced with metal which protected the structure from fire and vandalism. The lookout was last staffed in 1990. As of 2018, the building houses radio repeater equipment and cannot be easily reactivated for use as a fire tower once again.

The lookout atop Cone Peak was one of six active fire lookouts in the Monterey Ranger District of the Los Padres National Forest. The others were located on Chews Ridge, Ventana Double Cone, Junipero Serra Peak, Pinyon Peak, and Three Peaks.

The mountain slopes contain an old-growth Sugar pine (Pinus lambertiana) forest along with many colonies of Santa Lucia fir (Bristlecone fir, Abies bracteata), one of the rarest and most endemic fir in North America, and according to some, the world. Cone Peak was visited by notable botanists David Douglas in March 1831, Thomas Coulter in 1832 or 1833, Karl Theodor Hartweg in September 1847, and William Lobb in 1849.

== See also ==
- Mountain peaks of California
