= Ventana Wildlife Society =

Non-profit environmental organization in Monterey, California, United States

- Type: Non-profit
- Industry: Wildlife conservation Outdoor youth education
- Founded: 1977
- Headquarters: Monterey, California, United States.
- Area served: Central Coast, California
- Key people: Kelly Sorenson (executive director)
- Number of employees: 12 full time and 35 seasonal
- Website: www.ventanaws.org

Ventana Wildlife Society (VWS) is a 501(c)(3) non-profit organization founded in 1977 by a group of private citizens to restore endangered species native to central California. VWS has a team of full-time staff biologists, and educators monitoring, tracking and researching endangered species, songbirds and butterflies. Educational science programs for school children bring youth in touch with nature in their own neighborhoods, or through summer science camps.

Since 1997, they have released captive-bred condors into the wild. During the 2020 Dolan Fire, 12 Condors were killed and a research building was destroyed. The structures were all rebuilt at their and field operations for the recovery of the California condor continue with streaming cameras available for the public to view on explore.org or the organization's website.

== History ==
In 1977, the Ventana Wildlife Society began by rehabilitating and releasing wildlife at a 240-acre (0.97 km^{2}) remote site in the Ventana Wilderness.

1982: VWS introduced a prairie and peregrine falcon release program.

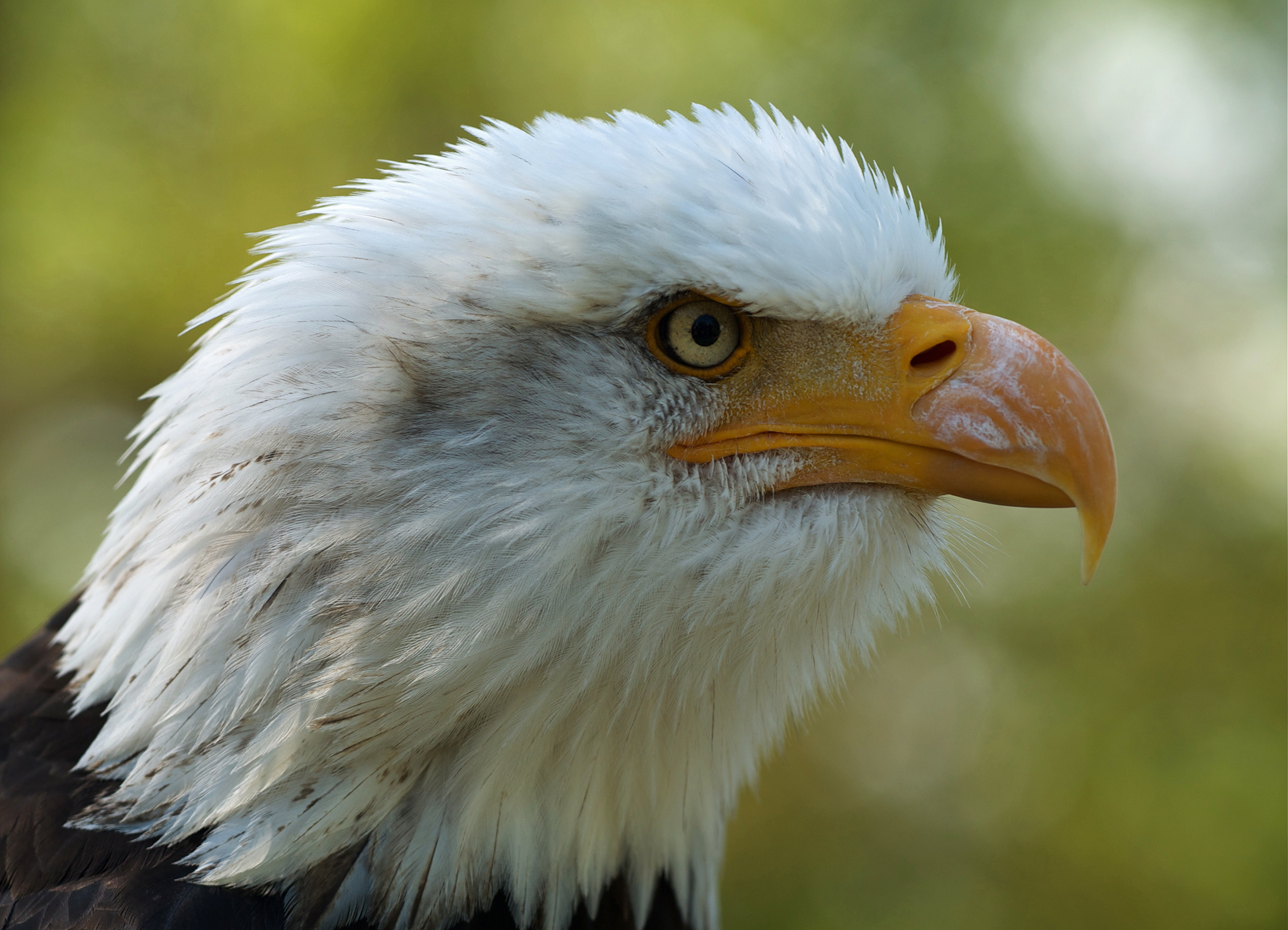
Bald eagle

1986: VWS began a bald eagle restoration project to reintroduce bald eagles after an absence of 60 years from the region. In only 10 years, VWS achieved success. In 2007, the bald eagle was officially declared recovered and delisted from the Endangered Species Act (ESA).

1992: The Ventana Wildlife Society Research and Education Center opened in Andrew Molera State Park, off scenic Highway 1, Big Sur. The facility is used to increase public outreach efforts and to expand programs to include environmental education and habitat restoration.

1996: VWS was commended by the California State Senate for its distinguished record of serving the recovery needs of Central Coast endangered species and for instilling a sense of stewardship for the environment through direct educational experience.

1997: VWS joined federal and state efforts to reintroduce the California condor and is the only non-profit releasing condors in California.

2009: VWS Discovery Center opened in Big Sur. The center features an exhibition, "Bringing the Condors Home".

2012: A total of 26 bald eagle nesting pairs were documented in central California Sorenson et al. 2017.

2012: Lead from spent ammunition was confirmed to be the primary source of poisoning in condors but not from shooting, instead by ingestion. Fragments and intact rifle bullets are often consumed by vultures and for the California Condor is it the leading cause of death. VWS begins to provide free non-lead ammunition to hunters and ranchers in an effort to encourage a switch to copper ammunition.

2020: During the wildfire season, a research building, pens, and other facilities were destroyed on their 80-acre (32 ha) sanctuary in Big Sur that has been used to release the condors into the wild since 1997. While no people or condors were at the site, ten condors and two chicks are believed to have died in the Dolan Fire that began about a mile south.

== Big Sur Condor Sanctuary ==
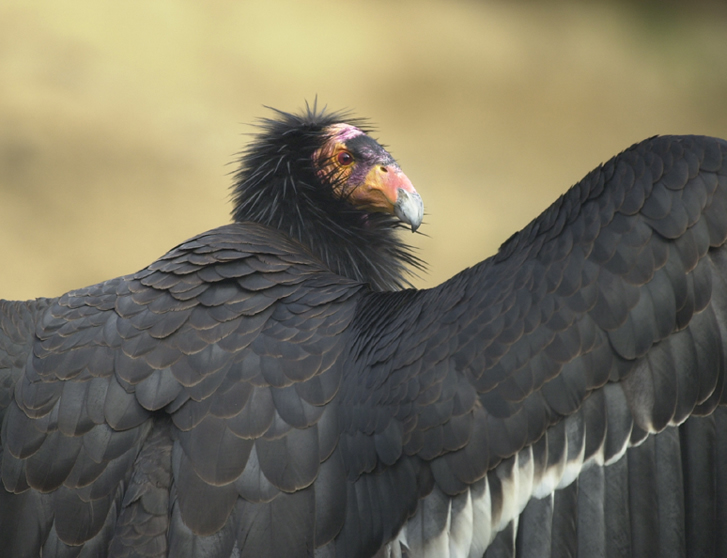
California condor

In 1987 the last of the wild free-flying condors were taken from the wild to become part of a captive breeding program. From a population perhaps numbering thousands across the U.S., the last surviving 27 birds were removed to prevent extirpation in California. Decades of shooting, environmental degradation, and lead poisoning had reduced the population to an unviable number that most likely would not survive to the new millennium without this urgent, and at times controversial, intervention.

In 1997, VWS began releasing captive-bred condors in Big Sur with great success and in 2003 initiated a second release site at Pinnacles National Monument (now Pinnacles National Park) in collaboration with the National Park Service.

All of the free-flying birds are tagged and can be tracked via radio transmitter or GPS. VWS has created a website where one can learn more about the varied personalities of each of the birds of the Big Sur flock, and a live streaming camera operated by Explore.org.

In 2007, the first condor chick hatched in the wild (in Monterey County) in 100 years.

In 2009, 42 condors were reported free-flying in central California. With five chicks set to fledge, this was one of the best years for the Central Coast population. But California condors continue to be plagued with lead poisoning, micro-trash ingestion, and DDT residues, which all are seriously hampering the long-term recovery of the species.

The Vallejo Times Herald reported that in May 2014, California condor #597 (also known as Lupine) was spotted near Pescadero, a coastal community south of San Francisco. This is the first California condor spotted in San Mateo County since 1904. The three-year-old female flew more than 100 miles (160 km) north from Pinnacles National Park, in San Benito County, on May 30, and landed on a private, forested property near Pescadero, on the San Mateo County Coast, where it was photographed by a motion-activated wildlife camera. Kelly Sorenson, executive director of the Ventana Wildlife Society, stated: "It's very important. It shows that they really are spreading out in their range. It's very exciting. It shows that we're on the right track. The population is expanding. They are breeding on their own. They are finding food on their own."

By July 2014, the condor population, including sites in California, Baja California and Arizona, has grown to 437. There is a population of 232 wild birds and 205 in captivity. Ventana Wildlife Society manages 34 free-flying condors, of which it has fledged 9.

On August 18, 2020, the Dolan Fire near Lime Creek was intentionally started by an arsonist. During the next two days, the fire burned through the 80-acre (32 ha) site, destroyed a research building, pens, and other facilities, and killed ten adult condors and two chicks.

In 2024, the wild population in central California reached 110 condors with nine wild fledges plus captive-raised birds from zoos. Poor availability of small arms ammunition may be contributing to the ongoing lead poisoining crisis for the species in California. Focused on saving the condor, conservation biologists use GPS-based targeting of landowners to offer free non-lead ammunition and in 2026 began advocating for better access.
