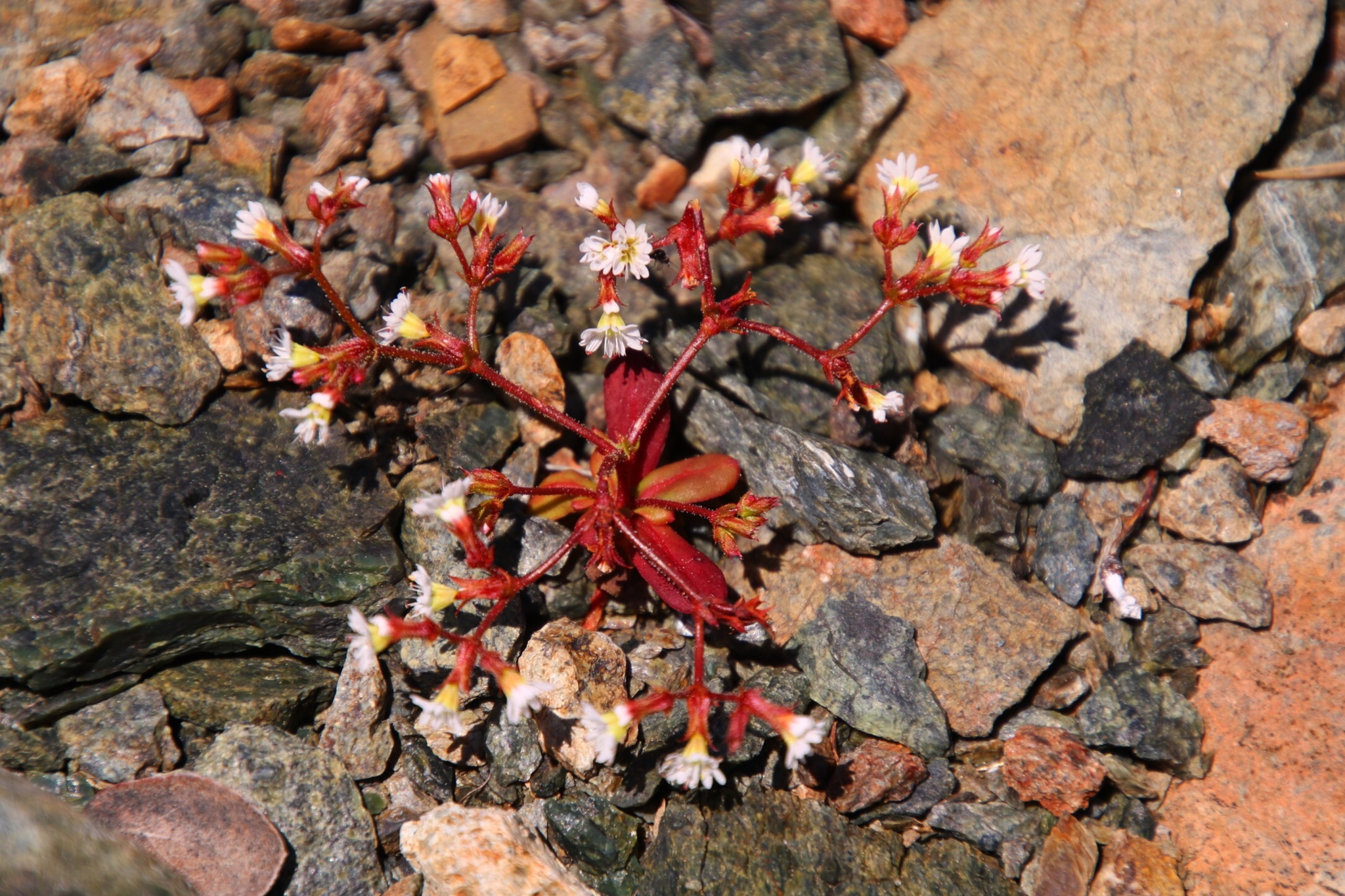

Scientific classification
- Kingdom: Plantae
- Clade: Tracheophytes
- Clade: Angiosperms
- Clade: Eudicots
- Order: Caryophyllales
- Family: Polygonaceae
- Subfamily: Eriogonoideae
- Genus: Systenotheca; Reveal & Hardham
- Species: S. vortriedei

Binomial name
- Systenotheca vortriedei (Brandegee) Reveal & Hardham

Synonyms
- Chorizanthe vortriedei Centrostegia vortriedei

= Systenotheca =

Genus of plants

Systenotheca is a monotypic plant genus in the buckwheat family containing the single species Systenotheca vortriedei, which is known by the common name Vortriede's spineflower.

== Description ==
This is a small annual plant growing to a maximum of 15 centimeters in height, and easily identifiable with its red stems and foliage and white flowers.

== Distribution ==
This wildflower is endemic to California, where it is native to the Santa Lucia Mountains of the central coast. This is an uncommon plant in its small native range where it grows in serpentine soil at some elevation.
