= Tierra Redonda Mountain =

- Location within California

Highest point
- Elevation: 2,070 ft (631 m) NAVD 88
- Coordinates: 35°46′16″N 120°59′09″W

Geography
- Location: San Luis Obispo County, California, U.S.
- Parent range: Santa Lucia Range
- Topo map: USGS Tierra Redonda Mountain

Climbing
- Easiest route: Trail hike

Tierra Redonda Mountain is a mountain in northwestern San Luis Obispo County, California. It is in the eastern portion of the Santa Lucia Range, separated from the main ridge by the Nacimiento River.

== Location ==
The mountain is north of Lake Nacimiento, with the summit being about a mile and a half (two kilometers) from the shoreline near the northwestern extremity of the lake. It is about 18 miles (29 km) from the Pacific Ocean at San Simeon. The elevation of the summit is 2,051 feet (625 m). The primary maintained public road to the mountain is Interlake Road, San Luis Obispo County G14 (also signed in nearby Monterey County as G14), which passes about 1.5 miles (2.4 kilometers) northeast of the summit. This road intersects U.S. Highway 101 at Paso Robles, about 20 miles (32 kilometers) to the southeast. Oak Shores Drive winds around the western portion of the mountain from a junction with G14 to the shore of Lake Nacimiento, and Tierra Redonda Road comes around from the east.

The mountain is part of a small island of Bureau of Land Management land, 320 acres (1.3 km^{2}), entirely surrounded by private land. BLM has designated it as an Area of Critical Environmental Concern (ACEC), along with several other BLM holdings in the area (such as the Carrizo Plain and Cypress Mountain) due to the high concentration of unique, sensitive, and threatened species found in the vicinity, as well as for its singularly rich paleontological resources. This designation is in part because of encroaching development from the south, where private residences are being built on the shore of Lake Nacimiento, within the Oak Shores community. The region has also designated the region as open space in their General Plan.

== Natural setting ==
Primary plant communities represented around the mountain include chaparral and blue oak woodlands, although grasslands and unusual sand dune formations also occur. Within the ACEC there are several sensitive plant species, some endemic to the area. These include several species of Chorizanthe, among the most concentrated known anywhere, along with ribbonwood, Salinas Valley goldfields, San Luis Obispo County lupine, and the one-awned spineflower.

While petroleum exploration is not presently occurring in the vicinity, the potential for oil and gas is considered by the BLM to be moderate. The Vaqueros Formation, which outcrops significantly on the mountain, accounting for its famous fossil beds, is an oil-bearing unit at the South Cuyama and Russell Ranch Oil Fields to the southeast, and the large, prolific San Ardo Oil Field, one of the most active in California, is only ten miles to the northeast, along U.S. 101.

== Historical Facts ==
The early pioneers of the area considered climbing to the summit of Tierra Redonda ("Terra Donda") a destination for a picnic. An American flag on a flagpole was visible from the lowlands. It was unknown who placed the flag or who replaced it when it became tattered.
