= Dolan Fire =

2020 wildfire in central California, US

- Part of the 2020 California wildfires
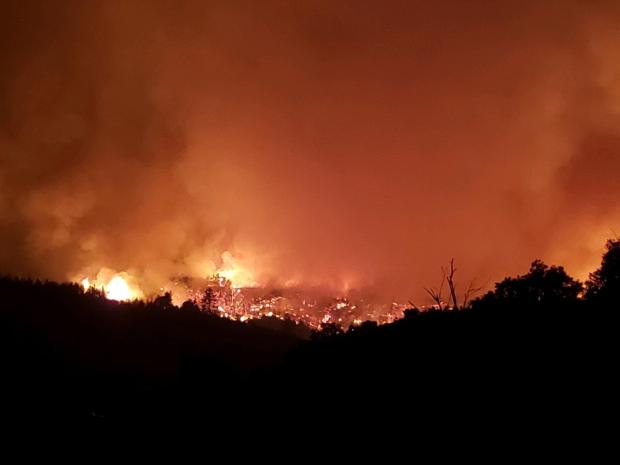
- The Dolan fire on Sept 8, 2020
- Date: August 18, 2020 –; December 31, 2020
- Location: Big Sur, California
- Coordinates: 36.123°N 121.602°W

Statistics
- Total area: 128,050 acres (51,820 ha)

Impacts
- Injuries: 15
- Structures lost: 14

Ignition
- Cause: Arson

Map
- Location of the Dolan Fire

The Dolan Fire was a large wildfire that burned in the Big Sur region and other parts of the Santa Lucia mountain range in Monterey County, California, in the United States as part of the 2020 California wildfire season. The fire began at approximately 8:15 p.m. on August 18, 2020. On September 8, 15 firefighters were injured, one critically, when they were forced to deploy emergency fire shelters at Nacimiento Station. Ten adult California condors and two chicks died in the blaze, which began about a mile south of the Big Sur Condor Sanctuary in Monterey County. The nonprofit Ventana Wildlife Society of Monterey lost a sanctuary that has been used to release the captive-bred condors into the wild since 1997. While no people or condors were at the 80-acre (32 ha) site, a research building, pens, and other facilities were destroyed.

The fire burned parts of the Ventana Wilderness, Fort Hunter Liggett, along Nacimiento-Fergusson Road, and forced the closure of many area state parks as well as a section of California State Route 1. As of December 31, 2020, the fire has been fully contained. According to the D.A, the estimated cost of fighting the fire was $63 million. The fire also destroyed the USFS Nacimiento Ranger Station.

During winter storms following the fire, entire sections of the Nacimiento-Fergusson Road were washed away, reopening in November 2024 after $12 million in repairs. In January 2022, U.S. Representative Jimmy Panetta announced that he had obtained $126 million in Federal Highway Administration funds to repair the road and rebuild the USFS Nacimiento Ranger Station destroyed in the blaze. This includes replacing the fire station, barracks, engine garage and pumphouse, along with some site utilities, such as a water well, solar connections and access roads.

The Dolan fire was started by arson, and Ivan Gomez was arrested in connection with the fire and convicted of arson subsequent to his confession. Gomez claimed he lit the fire to hide five murders, but his mental competency, the true intentionality of the arson, and the actual existence of bodies were put in question. On September 23, 2020, a judge ruled that he was competent to stand trial. He was convicted in April 2022 of 16 felony counts, including arson and cruelty to animals. In May 2022, he was sentenced to 24 years in state prison.

== See also ==
- 2020 California wildfires
