= Ventana Double Cone =

Mountain in California, United States

- Location within California

Highest point
- Elevation: 4,856 ft (1,480 m) NAVD 88
- Coordinates: 36°17′49″N 121°42′53″W

Geography
- Location: Monterey County, California, U.S.
- Parent range: Santa Lucia Mountains
- Topo map: USGS Ventana Cones

Climbing
- Easiest route: Trail hike

The Ventana Double Cone at 4,856 feet (1,480 m) is one of the tallest peaks in the Ventana Wilderness within the Monterey Ranger District of the Los Padres National Forest in Central California. The summit is a difficult 14.7 miles (23.7 km) hike from the nearest trail head, making it one of the more distant locations in the wilderness. The last 4 miles (6.4 km) portion of the trail from Little Pines to the summit is not well used and often overgrown with chaparral. There are a few Santa Lucia Firs near the summit.

There is a metal ammo box containing a summit register under some rocks at the peak. The peak is at the center of three watersheds: the Big Sur River watershed to the south, the Little Sur River watershed to the west and north west, and the Carmel River watershed to the east and south east. The largely inaccessible Ventana Cone is a few miles to the southeast. The view from the Ventana Double Cone is notable, enabling individuals to view the Pacific Ocean to the west and Chew's Ridge 30 miles inland. The summit is often covered in fog during summer months and hikers need to arrive at the peak in the morning to maximize chances of a clear view.

== Fire lookout ==
A forest fire lookout was built by the Civilian Conservation Corps in 1934-35 along with a supply trail that connected the lookout via Rattlesnake Creek to the Carmel River Guard Station. The lookout was situated on the southern of the two peaks, offering the lookout staff a wide view over the region.

When the Bottchers Gap Guard Station was built in 1950, the Double Cone Trail was constructed that connected to the Rattlesnake Creek trail. Supplies were then brought in for summer fire lookout season by a twice-monthly pack train. The Forest Patrolman who resided at Bottcher's Gap led the train over Skinner Ridge and the Ventana Double Cone trail. The mule train usually spent one night of the trip at the old Comings Cabin. (Note: Sherman Comings, a descendant of a family who purchased property near Bottcher's Gap in 1927, says his family spelled the name "Boucher.") The lookout tower was decommissioned in the mid-1960s. The structure was struck by lightning or deliberately set fire by USFS personnel and burned to the ground in 1967 to 1977. Only the stone and concrete foundation remains today.

The lookout atop the Ventana Double Cone was one of six active fire lookouts in the Monterey Ranger District of the Los Padres National Forest. The others were located on Chews Ridge, Cone Peak, Junipero Serra Peak, Pinyon Peak, and Three Peaks.

== Toponymy ==
Ventana means 'window' in the Spanish language. Early explorers gave the Ventana Double Cone its name for a large slot, or window in the ridge about 1 mile northwest of the summit.

== See also ==
- Mountain peaks of California
