= Nacimiento-Fergusson Road =

Road in California

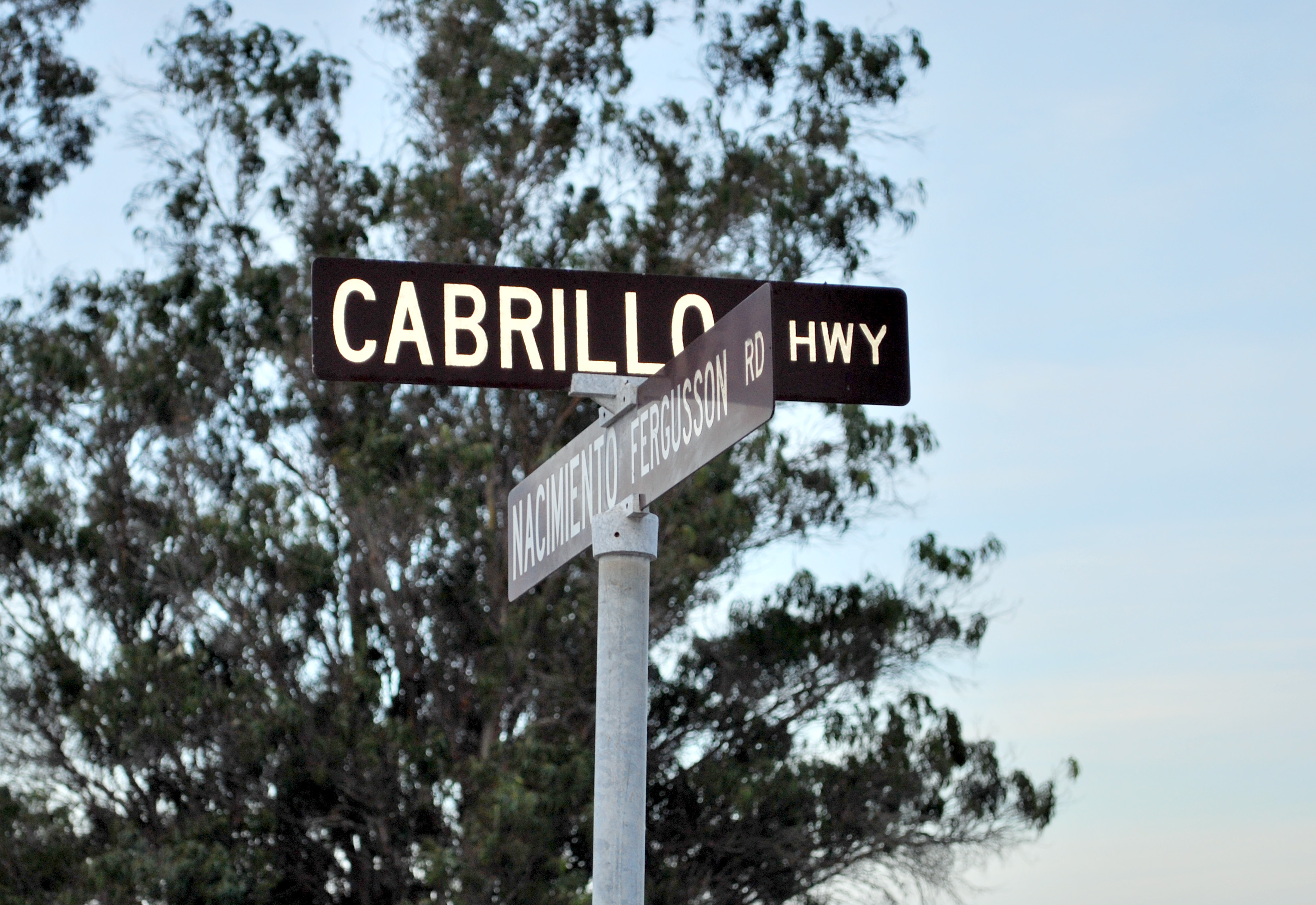
- Nacimiento-Fergusson Road junction with Highway 1 at Kirk Creek Bridge
- Maintained by: Monterey County, California
- Length: 24.5 mi (39.4 km)
- West end: SR 1 along the Big Sur coast
- East end: Mission Road in Jolon

Nacimiento-Fergusson Road is the only road across the Santa Lucia Range on the Central Coast of California, connecting California State Route 1 and the Big Sur coast to U.S. Route 101 and the Salinas Valley. The road is well-paved and maintained over its length, but is winding and has precipitous drops. It is widely regarded as one of the best motorcycling roads in central California due to its ocean views and forest setting.

In January 2021, the road was washed out due to the impacts of the Dolan Fire and closed. After extensive repairs, on November 15, 2024, the road reopened to through traffic.

== History ==
During the late 19th century, settlers on the coast of the northern Santa Lucia Mountains had a difficult time transporting cattle to the Central Valley over poor mountain trails. The only trail across the mountains was the route currently followed by the Nacimiento-Fergusson Road. The trail was enlarged into a road beginning in 1931, and completed in 1937. The road was constructed by crews composed of men from the Civilian Conservation Corp, U.S. Forest Service, and state and county relief agencies.

During winter storms following the 2020 Dolan Fire, entire sections of the road were washed away. In January 2022, U.S. Representative Jimmy Panetta announced that he had obtained $12.6 million in Federal Highway Administration funds to repair the road and rebuild the USFS Nacimiento Ranger Station destroyed in the blaze. This includes replacing the fire station, barracks, engine garage and pumphouse, along with some site utilities, such as a water well, solar connections and access roads. In August 2024, KSBW television reported that the road had opened to local residents. In November 2024 the road was re-opened to normal through traffic.

== Route description ==
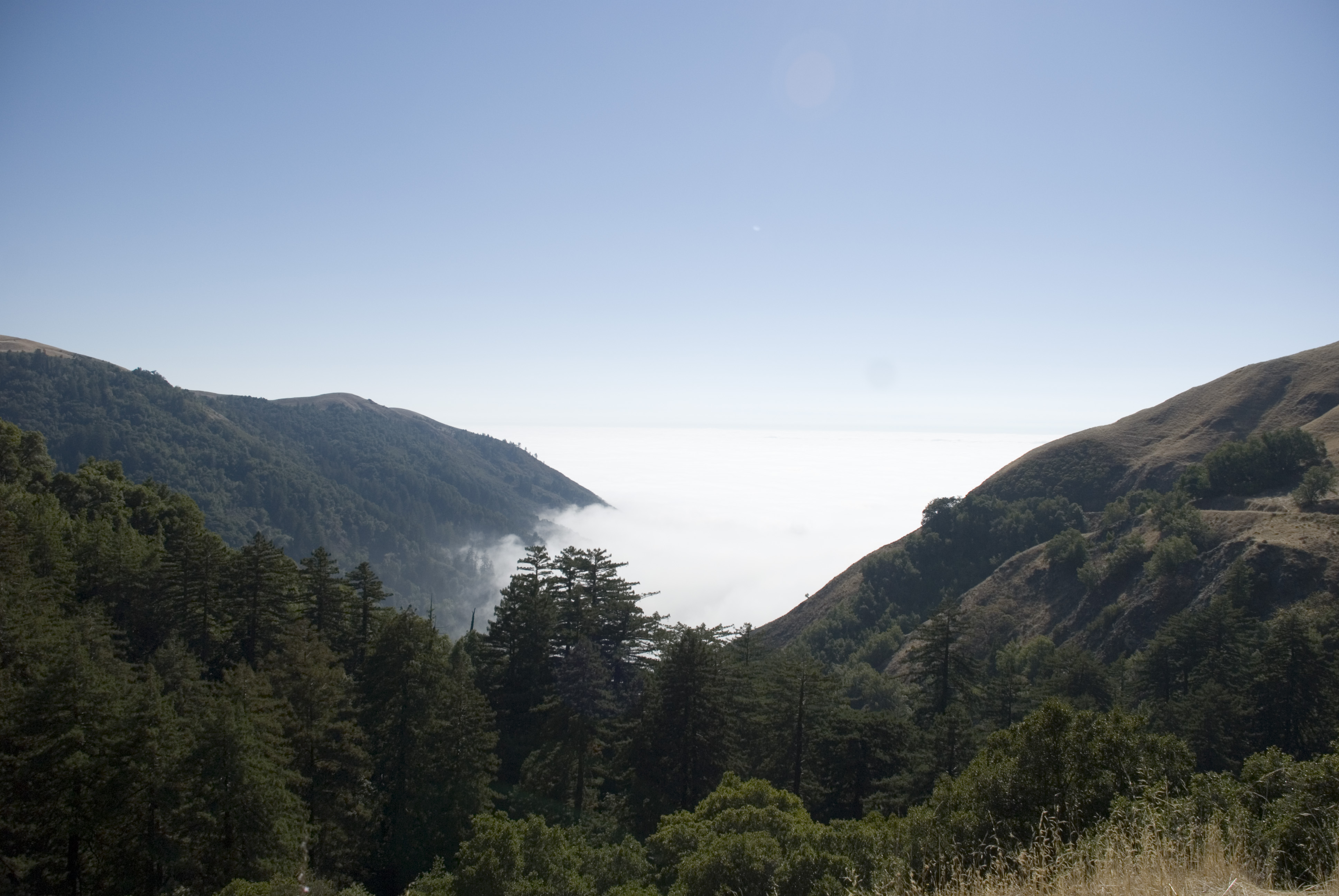
View to the west from Nacimiento-Fergusson Road

Nacimiento-Fergusson Road connects California State Route 1 at the south end of the Kirk Creek Bridge with Jolon 24.5 miles (39.4 km) to the east. It is the only route across the Santa Lucia Mountains between Monterey and Cambria in northern San Luis Obispo County where California State Route 46 connects California State Route 1 to U.S. Route 101 in Paso Robles at the southern end of the Salinas Valley.

The western terminus is located 4 miles (6.4 km) south of Lucia and 35 miles (56 km) north of Hearst Castle. Climbing up the steep flanks of the mountains, the western part of the road near the coast has more than 100 turns before it reaches the summit 7 miles (11 km) from the coast at an altitude of 2,780 feet (850 m), where it crosses the unpaved Coast Ridge Road.

From the summit, the road descends through hillside chaparral and dense oak groves on the eastern side of the ridge, which offer few views, and passes through the U.S. Army's Fort Hunter Liggett. Because the road passes through sections of Fort Hunter Liggett Army Base, you may need to show valid car registration and proof of insurance. The road is steep, winding, sometimes only wide enough for one vehicle, and has precipitous drops at almost every turn unprotected by guard rails.

At the eastern end, drivers can access the road via either from the north on Jolon Road on U.S. Route 101 near King City, or from the south on Jolon Road at U.S. Route 101 near Bradley. The road is closed occasionally during tank, artillery, and other firing exercises on the surrounding Fort Hunter Liggett.

== Campgrounds ==
The Nacimiento and Ponderosa Campgrounds are situated on the eastern slope of the Santa Lucia range within Los Padres National Forest. The Nacimiento Campground, nestled beneath Douglas fir trees alongside the Nacimiento River, is adjacent to Nacimiento-Fergusson Road and provides less privacy. Ponderosa Campground, known on some maps as "Camp Nacimiento", provides a private setting within a valley off the main road along the Negro Fork of the Nacimiento River.

Due to the history of wildfires in the area, campfires are only permitted in established campgrounds. It is illegal to camp in other locations, such as road side pullouts. Illegal camping or campfires can result in a $5,000 fine.
