= Pacific Slope =

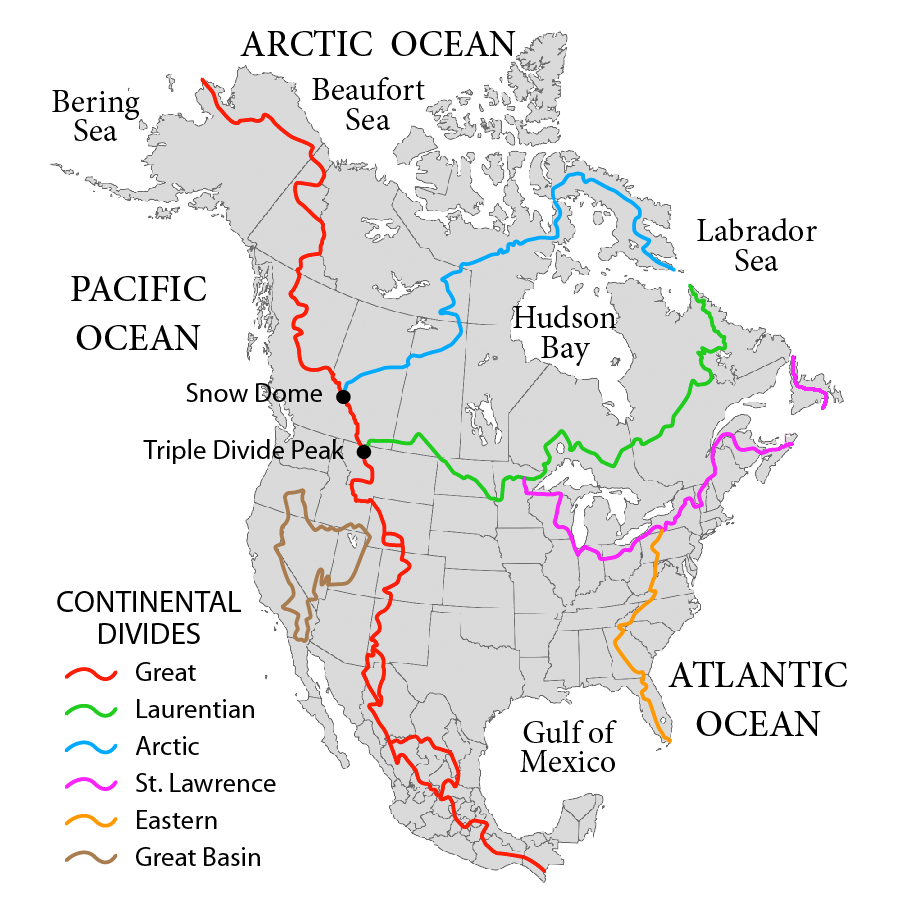
The Pacific Slope is west of the continental divide (red line) in North and Central America.

The Pacific Slope describes geographic regions in North American, Central American, and South American countries that are west of the continental divide and slope down to the Pacific Ocean. In North America, the Rocky Mountains mark the eastern border of the Pacific Slope. In Central and South America, the region is much narrower, confined by the Sierra Madre Occidental in Central America, and by the Andes in South America. The phrase is still used today mostly for scientific purposes to refer to regions inhabited by specific species.

It was and is still occasionally used to describe the region in North America during the 19th century and the expansion of the Old West. It includes the states and territories west of the continental divide that runs down the Rocky Mountains in North America. This included the territories and the states that emerged from them, including California, Oregon Territory, Washington Territory, Nevada Territory, Idaho Territory, Colorado Territory, and Utah Territory. The region is drained by the Columbia, Sacramento, San Joaquin and Colorado River systems. In the United States, the Pacific-slope flycatcher takes its name from the region it inhabits.

In Central America, it includes the mountain and coastal regions west of the Continental Divide in Mexico and southern Guatemala, southwestern Honduras, western Nicaragua, and western/southwestern Costa Rica, and southern Panama. In Guatemala, the Pacific Slope region is a humid plain of fertile land divided into widespread plantations (fincas) that grow abundant crops including sugarcane, bananas, and rubber. In Costa Rica, the Pacific Slope refers to the region west of the continental divide at Monteverde, Costa Rica.

In South America, the Pacific Slope is the narrow region west of the highest points of the Andes, including western Colombia, central Ecuador, western and southwestern Peru, and eastern Chile.
