= Southern Redwood Botanical Area =

- Location within California Location within the United States
- Location: Big Sur, California, United States
- Nearest city: Big Sur, California
- Coordinates: 35°49′42″N 121°23′14″W
- Governing body: United States Forest Service

The Southern Redwood Botanical Area (also known as Southern Redwood Special Interest Area) is a 17 acres (6.9 ha) ecological preserve in the southern region of Big Sur in Monterey County, California, just north of the national forest's Salmon Creek trailhead. Established by the Los Padres National Forest of the United States Forest Service, it contains the southernmost naturally occurring Redwood. The trees are located in the Little Redwood Gulch watershed adjacent to the Silver Peak Wilderness. The area is just north of the Salmon Creek trailhead.

In 2008, scientist J. Michael Fay published a map of the old growth redwoods based on his transect of the entire redwood range. The southernmost tree is about 15 feet (4.6 m) from Highway 1. The reserve is 7 miles (11 km) north of San Carpoforo Creek. It is unmarked and is not open to the public. The botanical area is classified as a special interest area under Title 36, Code of Federal Regulations, Section 294.1(a) due to its unique botanical resources for public and scientific purposes.

== See also ==
- Sequoia sempervirens
- Big Sur
