= Junipero Serra Peak =

Mountain in California, United States

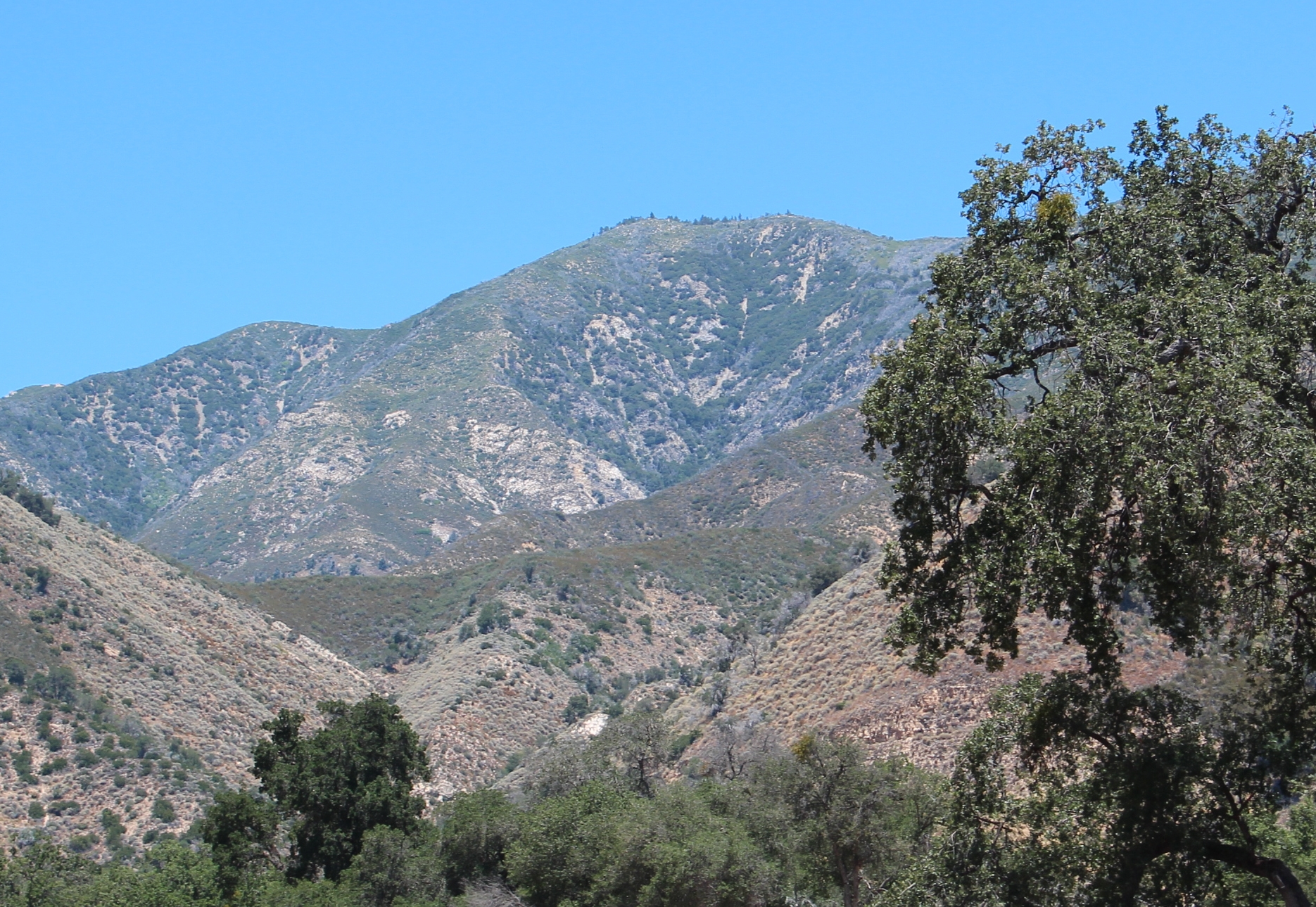
- Junipero Serra Peak in 2015

Highest point
- Elevation: 5,857 ft (1,785 m) NAVD 88
- Prominence: 4,447 ft (1,355 m)
- Listing: North America isolated peaks 99th; California county high points 36th
- Coordinates: 36°08′44″N 121°25′08″W

Geography
- Location within California Location within the United States
- Location: Monterey County, California, U.S.
- Parent range: Santa Lucia Mountains
- Topo map: Junipero Serra Peak

Climbing
- Easiest route: Trail hike

Junipero Serra Peak is the highest mountain in the Santa Lucia range of central California with a height of 1,785 metres (5,856 feet). It is also the highest peak in Monterey County, and is located within the boundaries of Los Padres National Forest. It is named after Saint Junípero Serra, the Spanish Franciscan priest who founded the California Missions in the 18th century. Near the peak, there is a fire lookout consisting of a tower and building that was constructed around 1935. An unauthorized skiing operation on the summit was reported sometime before 1970. Good astronomical observing conditions were an early attraction to the peak. Astronomers blazed a trail to the summit in January 1880 to observe a total eclipse of the sun. Observations from the peak were also made on the transit of Venus in 1882.

== Toponymy ==
It was originally named Santa Lucia Peak, as it is the highest point in the range of the same name. Wanting to honor Junípero Serra, the Native Daughters of the Golden West had bestowed his name upon a Sierra Nevada peak in June 1905. However, the Sierra Club recommended that the name be transferred to Santa Lucia Peak. The United States Board on Geographic Names officially approved the name change in 1906 finding that Junípero Serra was familiar with the Santa Lucia Mountains, but in all likelihood he had never encountered the Sierra Nevada.

The peak was named Pimkolam by the Salinan Native Americans.

== Climate ==
Since the peak is over 5,000 feet (1,500 m), temperatures in winter are low enough to support snowfall and relatively high amounts of precipitation compared to the Salinas Valley and places farther east in the Coast Ranges. Although by far the tallest of the Santa Lucia Range peaks, Junipero Serra Peak appears to have a drier climate than the others. No long-term weather data are available. Walker (1970), an astronomer who spent several seasons on the summit, measured 51 cm (20 in) of rain plus 93 cm (37 in) of snow during the 1965–66 season. In adjacent regions this was an "average" season. In the wet 1966–67 season he measured 100 cm (39 in) of rain plus 304 cm (1 19.7 inches) of snow.

There is no surface water above 5,000 ft in summer. In years with above-average rainfall some creeks may start at 4,800 ft (1,500 m); permanent creeks flow at 4,500 ft (1,400 m).

== Ecology ==
Montane pine forest dominated by sugar pine covers areas of the peak's north summit and the upper reaches of water courses on the north slope. Junípero Serra Peak and nearby Cone Peak sugar pine forests are isolated from the next sugar pine stands by 220 km. An interesting feature of this sugar pine population is the unexpectedly high frequency of a major gene for resistance to white pine blister rust. This fatal disease, caused by an exotic pathogen, has caused high mortality to sugar pine and other white pine in North America. Natural resistance in other sugar pine populations ranges from near 0% in the South Cascade Range to 8% in the southern Sierra Nevada; on Junipero Serra, it is 8.9%. No blister rust has as yet been reported in this stand. The Junípero Serra Peak pines are surrounded by a vast area of scrubby mixed hardwood forest and chaparral. Understory shrubs and herbs associated with the pine forest are also isolated from distant forests, and many of them differ from the nearby isolated montane species on Cone Peak. The most interesting disjunct is Cycladenia humilus var. venusta, which has one population under the pines on the summit of Junipero Serra Peak and three tiny colonies on Cone Peak. The type specimen of this variety is collected at the peak of Junipero Serra Peak.

Mountain chickadee, common in southern California and Sierra Nevada montane forest, is present in the South Coast Ranges only in the Junipero Serra Peak and Cone Peak forests.

== Fire history ==
Junipero Serra Peak has a long history of wildfires. Between 1640 and 1907 fires hot enough to produce basal scars on pines in a small isolated sugar pine forest in the Santa Lucia Range of central California occurred on average once every 21 years. Except for two small lightning fires that were quickly extinguished, no fires occurred in the pine forest after 1907 until the lightning-caused Marble Cone Fire burned the entire forest in 1977. This was the most intense burn recorded within the life of the present forest. It caused significant loss of pines, particularly within the 40 percent of the forest on the north summit above 1600 m elevation. Changes in forest composition resulting from the Marble Cone Fire suggest that several more fires following 50-75 year intervals may eliminate sugar pine forest above 1600 m on Junípero Serra Peak.

More recently, the Dolan Fire burned the southern slopes and upper portions of the northern summit in the fall of 2020. Along with much of the southern Ventana Wilderness, Junipero Serra was also burned extensively in the 2008 Indians Fire.

== See also ==
- List of highest points in California by county
