= Santa Lucia Range =

Mountain range in California, United States

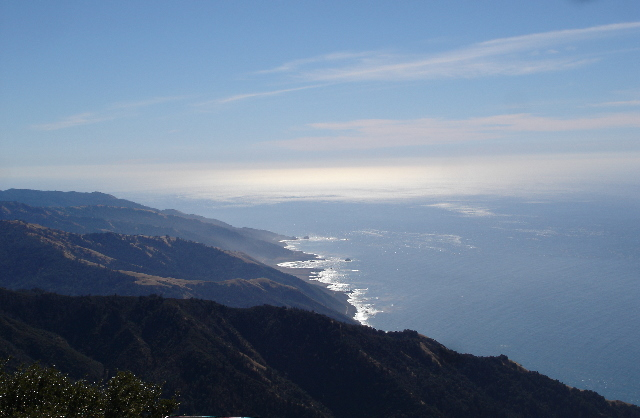
- November 2005 view from summit of Cone Peak, the highest coastal mountain in the lower 48 US states.

Highest point
- Peak: Junipero Serra Peak
- Elevation: 5,857 ft (1,785 m)

Geography
- Location within California
- Country: United States
- State: California
- Region(s): Monterey County; San Luis Obispo County
- Range coordinates: 36°3′3.861″N 121°28′8.769″W
- Topo map: USGS Cone Peak

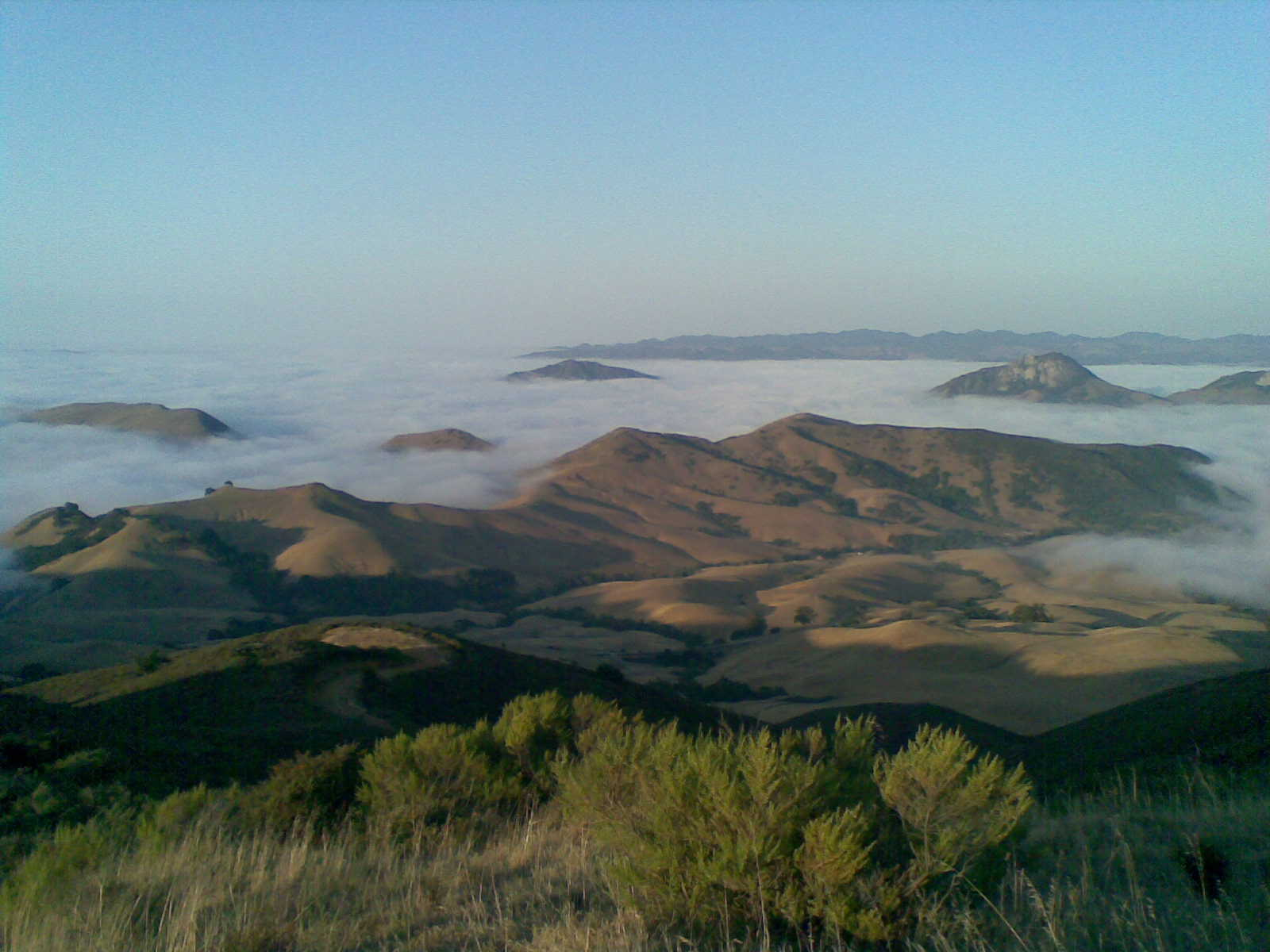
Santa Lucias in the clouds, near Santa Margarita

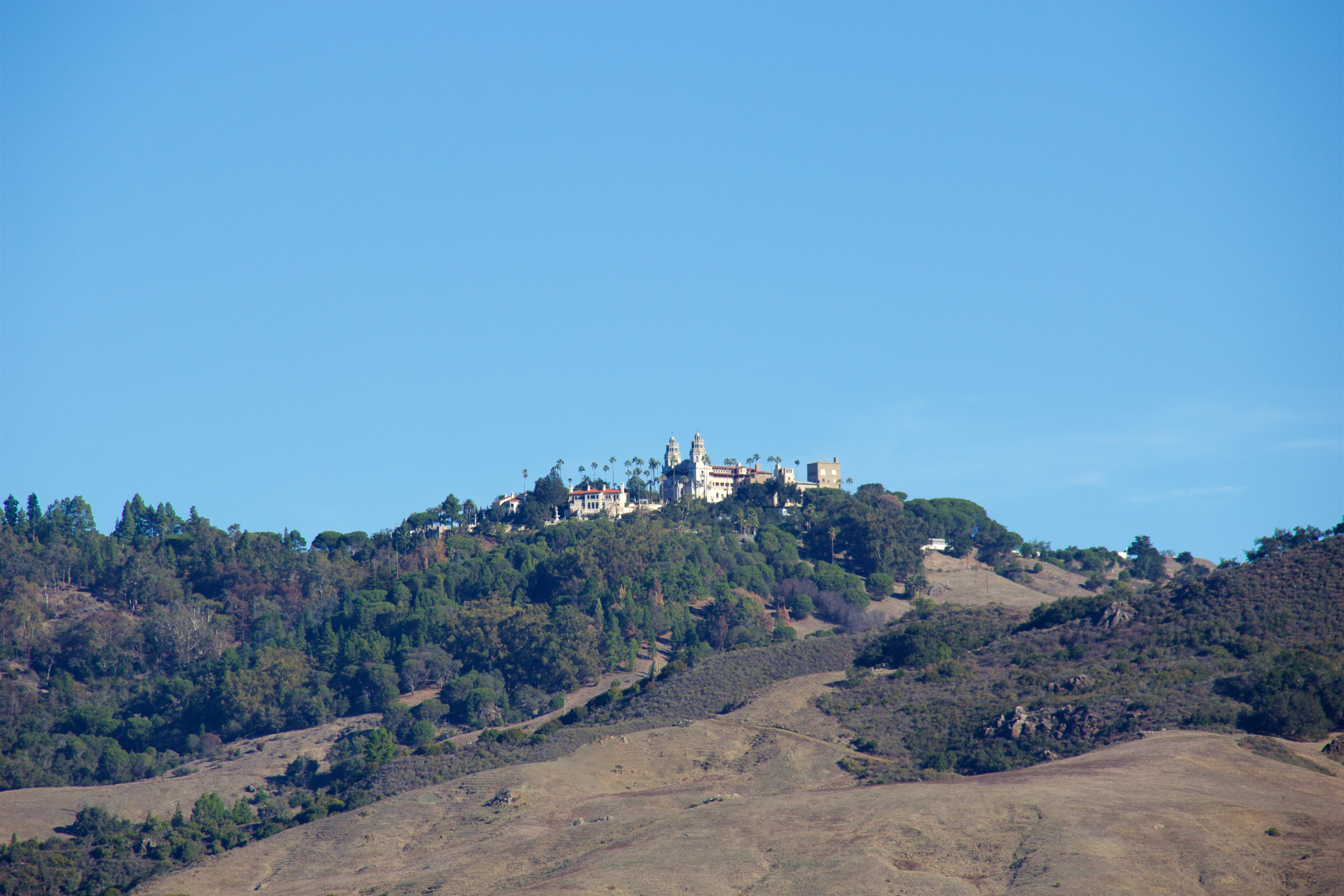
Hearst Castle was built atop Cuesta Ridge, the first ridgeline in from the ocean in that part of the Santa Lucia range.

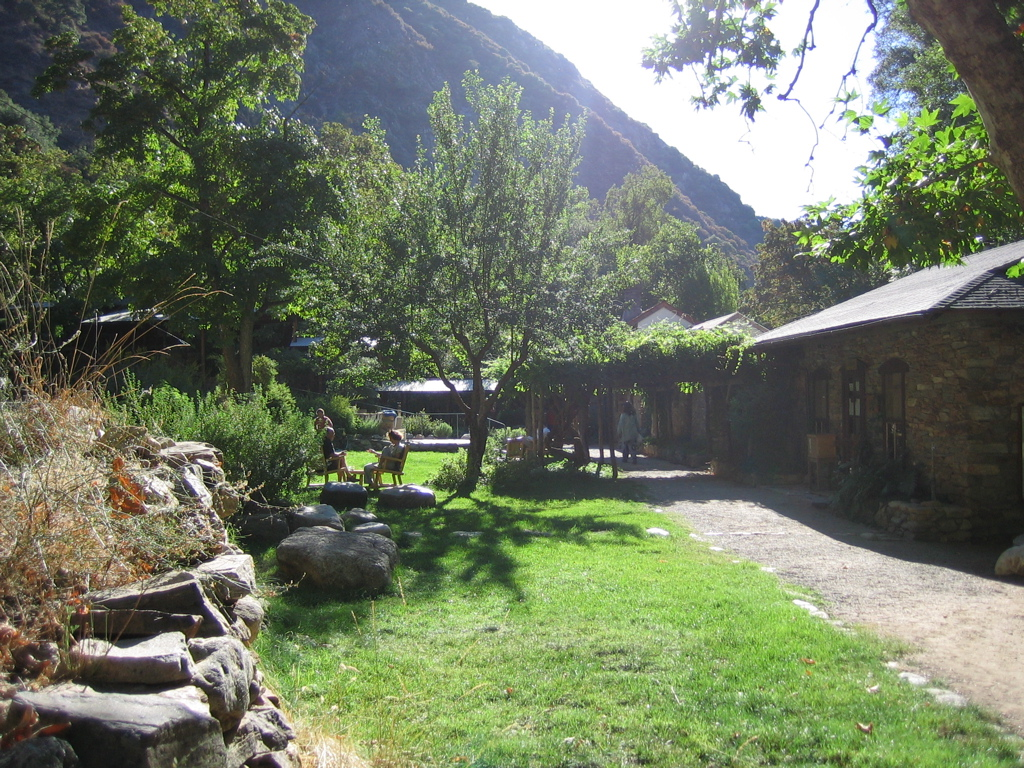
Tassajara Zen Mountain Center was built in the heart of the Santa Lucia range, in Monterey County.

The Santa Lucia Range (sæntə luˈsiːə) or Santa Lucia Mountains is a rugged mountain range in coastal Central California, running from Carmel southeast for 140 miles (230 km) to the Cuyama River in San Luis Obispo County. The range is never more than 11 miles (18 km) from the coast. The range forms the steepest coastal slope in the contiguous United States. Cone Peak at 5,158 feet (1,572 m) tall and three miles (5 km) from the coast, is the highest peak in proximity to the ocean in the lower 48 United States. The range was a barrier to exploring the coast of central California for early Spanish explorers.

== Geography ==
The Santa Lucia Range is part of the Outer South California Coast Ranges, in the Pacific Coast Ranges System. The coastal side of the range rises directly from the shoreline, with oceanfront ridges rising directly 4,000 to 5,000 feet (1,200 to 1,500 m) to the crest of the coastal range. The crest of the range is never more than 11 miles (18 km) from the coast. Cone Peak is the steepest coastal elevation in the contiguous United States, rising nearly a mile (1,609 m) above sea level, only three miles (5 km) from the Pacific Ocean.

The range's northern section runs parallel to the southern section of the Diablo Range, part of the Inner South Coast Ranges, which lies to the east across the Salinas Valley. The range's highest summit is Junipero Serra Peak, 1,784 metres (5,853 ft) in Monterey County and the Los Padres National Forest.

=== Major peaks ===
- Junipero Serra Peak, 5,857 feet (1,785 m).
- Cone Peak, 5,158 feet (1,572 m).
- Ventana Double Cone, 4,856 feet (1,480 m).
- Mount Carmel, 4,420 feet (1,347 m).

== History and toponymy ==
The first European to document the Santa Lucias was Juan Rodríguez Cabrillo in 1542 while sailing northward along the coast on a Spanish naval expedition. Cabrillo originally named the southern portion of the range the Sierras de San Martín, as he was passing the area on November 11, the feast day for Saint Martin. He named the northern part Sierras Nevadas because there was snow on it.

The present name for the range was documented in 1602 by Sebastián Vizcaíno, who had been tasked by the Spanish to complete a detailed chart of the coast. Passing by the range around December 14th, he named the range Sierra de Santa Lucia in honor of Saint Lucy of Syracuse, for whom many Christians celebrate the feast of Saint Lucy's Day on December 13th.

The first European land exploration of Alta California, the Spanish Portolá expedition, camped on the coast near Ragged Point in present-day San Luis Obispo County on September 13, 1769. The expedition was forced to bypass the inaccessible coast and travel inland through the San Antonio Valley. The rough trail required much improvement by the scouts, and it was September 24 before the party emerged from the mountains at the San Antonio River near today's settlement of Jolon. They traveled north through the Salinas Valley before arriving at Monterey Bay, where they founded Monterey and named it their capital.

== Natural history ==
=== Climate ===
Like other Pacific Coast Ranges, the mountains' close proximity to the Pacific Ocean causes moisture to be deposited on the west-facing slopes, creating a suitable environment for conifers. This creates a rain shadow over the Salinas Valley to the east, which is considerably drier. The higher peaks receive some snowfall during the winter.

The climate is classified as dry summer subtropical, or Mediterranean. Rainfall varies from 16 to 60 inches (41 to 152 cm) throughout the range. Most of the precipitation falls during the winter on the higher mountains in the north. During the summer, fog and low clouds are frequent along the coast up to an elevation of 2–3,000 feet. Surface runoff from rainfall is rapid, and many streams dry up entirely in the summer, except for some perennial streams in the wetter areas in the north.

=== Flora ===
The western slopes of the range facing the Pacific Ocean are moist with growths of coast redwood, Douglas fir, ponderosa pine, Sugar pine, Incense Cedar, Pacific madrone and the local endemic species such as Santa Lucia fir (Abies bracteata) and Gowen cypress (Cupressus goveniana var. goveniana). The east side is drier, with chaparral and open woods of pine (including Coulter pine and gray pine) and oak woodlands of several Quercus species.

The range is the southernmost native location of about 225 plant species, including the coast redwood trees, and the northernmost home for about 90 species. The southernmost naturally occurring grove of redwoods is found within the Big Sur region in the Southern Redwood Botanical Area, a 17 acres (6.9 ha) reserve located in the Little Redwood Gulch watershed adjacent to the Silver Peak Wilderness. It is just north of the Salmon Creek trailhead. The southernmost tree is about 15 feet (4.6 m) from Highway 1 at the approximate coordinates 35°49′42″N 121°23′14″W About 57 plants are only found in the Santa Lucia Mountains. This range is the only known habitat of the Vortriede's spineflower.

=== Fauna ===
The range is home to the largest population of mountain lions in the United States. The endangered Californian Condor lives in the range, as well as the turkey, and mammals such as invasive wild boar and opossum.

== Geology ==
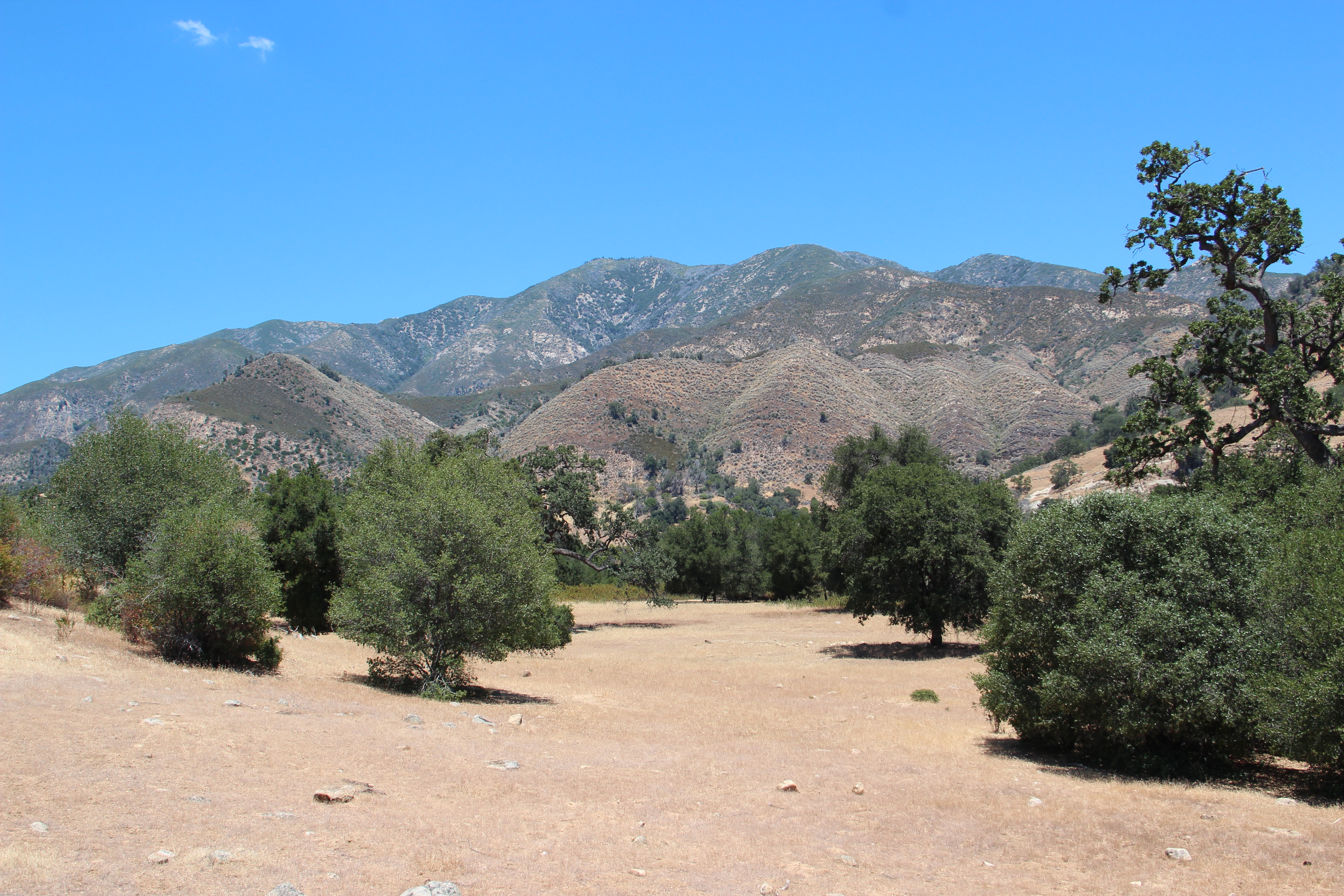
Junipero Serra Peak

The rock of the Santa Lucias is dominated by granitic basement of the Salinian Block, between the San Andreas Fault and Sur-Nacimiento Fault. The core of the Salinian block formed as part of the same batholith which forms the core of the Sierra Nevada Mountains and the Peninsular Ranges of Baja California. It was separated from the North American Plate and transported north by the action of the San Andreas Fault from an original position. It is predominantly Mesozoic granitic and pre-Cretaceous metamorphic rocks. There is some Cretaceous sedimentary rock of the Great Valley Sequence, considerable Miocene marine sediments, and some other Cenozoic sediments. Units west of the Sur-Nacimiento Fault are dominated by rocks of the Franciscan Assemblage.

The basement rocks of the Santa Lucia Range contain Mesozoic Franciscan and Salinian Block rocks. The Franciscan complex is composed of greywacke sandstone and greenstone, with serpentinite bodies and other Ultramafic rocks present. Small areas of marble and limestone lenses form resistant outcrops that are prominent landscape features, often white to light gray in color. The Salinian block is made up of highly fractured, and deeply weathered meta-sediments, especially biotite schist and gneiss, intruded by plutonic (granitic) rocks such as quartz diorite and granodiorite. Both formations have been disrupted and tectonically slivered by motion on the San Andreas and associated fault systems. The Palo Colorado and Church Creek faults are prominent features influencing the linear northwest–southeast alignment of primary drainages.

The Palo Colorado-San Gregorio fault system transitions onshore at Doud Creek, about 7 miles (11 km) south of Point Lobos, exposing the western edge of the Salinian block. Stream canyons frequently follow the north-westerly trending fault lines, rather than descending directly to the coast. The Salinian block is immediately south of the Monterey Submarine Canyon, one of the largest submarine canyon systems in the world, which is believed to have been an ancient outlet for the Colorado River.

The region is also traversed by the Sur-Hill fault, which is noticeable at Pfeiffer Falls in Pfeiffer Big Sur State Park. The 40 feet (12 m) waterfall were formed when the stream flowed over the hard gneiss of the Salinian block and encountered the softer Santa Margarita Sandstone. The falls were formed when the softer sandstone was worn away. The interior canyons are typically deep and narrow, and even in the summer sunshine only reaches many of the canyon bottoms for a few hours. The land is mostly steep, rocky, semi-arid except for the narrow canyons, and inaccessible. The Little Sur River canyon is characteristic of the Ventana Wilderness region: steep-sided, sharp-crested ridges separating valleys. At the mouth of the Little Sur river are some of the largest sand dunes on the Big Sur coast.

About 50 streams flow out of the mountains into the sea. A few of them, including the Big Sur and Little Sur Rivers, Big Creek, Garrapata Creek, and Salmon Creek, are large enough to support anadromous and resident fish.

== Transportation ==
California State Route 1 runs along the Big Sur coast on the coastal slopes of the range, while U.S. Route 101 lies in the Salinas Valley to the East, and crosses the southern Santa Lucia Range over Cuesta Pass to reach San Luis Obispo. California State Route 41 crosses the range from Atascadero to Morro Bay and Route 46 crosses from Templeton to Cambria. The only other paved road across the Santa Lucia Range is Nacimiento-Fergusson Road, connecting Lucia to Jolon.

== Folklore ==
Since at least the 1930s, accounts of encounters with Dark Watchers or Los Vigilantes Oscuros have been associated with the Santa Lucia Range, described as shadowy figures which watch hikers from atop mountain ridges.

The Lost Padre Mines of the Carmel Mission have become part of local folklore, with their legacy recounted through various accounts, including those within Randall Reinstadt's works such as Ghosts, Bandits, and Legends of Old Monterey, Carmel and Surrounding Areas and Tales and Treasures of California Missions. These narratives suggest that indigenous communities held knowledge of abundant gold deposits concealed within the untamed terrain of the Santa Lucia Mountains. As legends of these riches were passed down over time, the Lost Padre Mines attracted attention. Versions of these legends appear to have originated from long-time residents of Carmel Valley. The stories of ghosts may be attributed to the descendants of the last residents of the native people who remained hidden deep in the mountains after the missions failed.

== Contemporary history ==
Pacific Southwest Airlines Flight 1771 crashed in the mountains near Cayucos on December 7, 1987 after a gunman killed both pilots, causing the aircraft to crash. A total of 43 people were killed with no survivors.

=== Wine ===
The Santa Lucia Highlands AVA, an American Viticultural Area and producer of California wine, is located on the southeastern slopes of the mountains, above the Salinas valley.

=== Winds ===
Like the well known Santa Ana winds of Southern California or the Sundowner winds of Santa Barbara, Santa Lucia's Cuesta Grade on Highway 101 has potential to produce some powerful katabatic winds. Temperatures have been recorded jumping 40 degrees F, to 110 F, in just three hours.

== See also ==
- Tierra Redonda Mountain
